= Guinea mabuya =

There are two species of skink named Guinea mabuya:

- Trachylepis albilabris, found in Africa
- Trachylepis aureogularis, found in Guinea, Liberia, Ivory Coast, and Ghana
