= Variable skink =

Variable skink may refer to:

- P. m. epipleurotus, the southern subspecies of the Plestiodon multivirgatus, the many-lined skink from North America
- Trachylepis laevigata, a variable mabuya from South Africa
- Trachylepis varia, a variable mabuya from East Africa
