= Trachylepis chimbana =

Scientific classification
- Domain: Eukaryota
- Kingdom: Animalia
- Phylum: Chordata
- Class: Reptilia
- Order: Squamata
- Family: Scincidae
- Genus: Trachylepis
- Species: T. chimbana

Binomial name
- Trachylepis chimbana (Boulenger, 1887)

Species of lizard

Chimba skink or Chimban mabuya (Trachylepis chimbana) is a species of skink found in Namibia and Angola.
