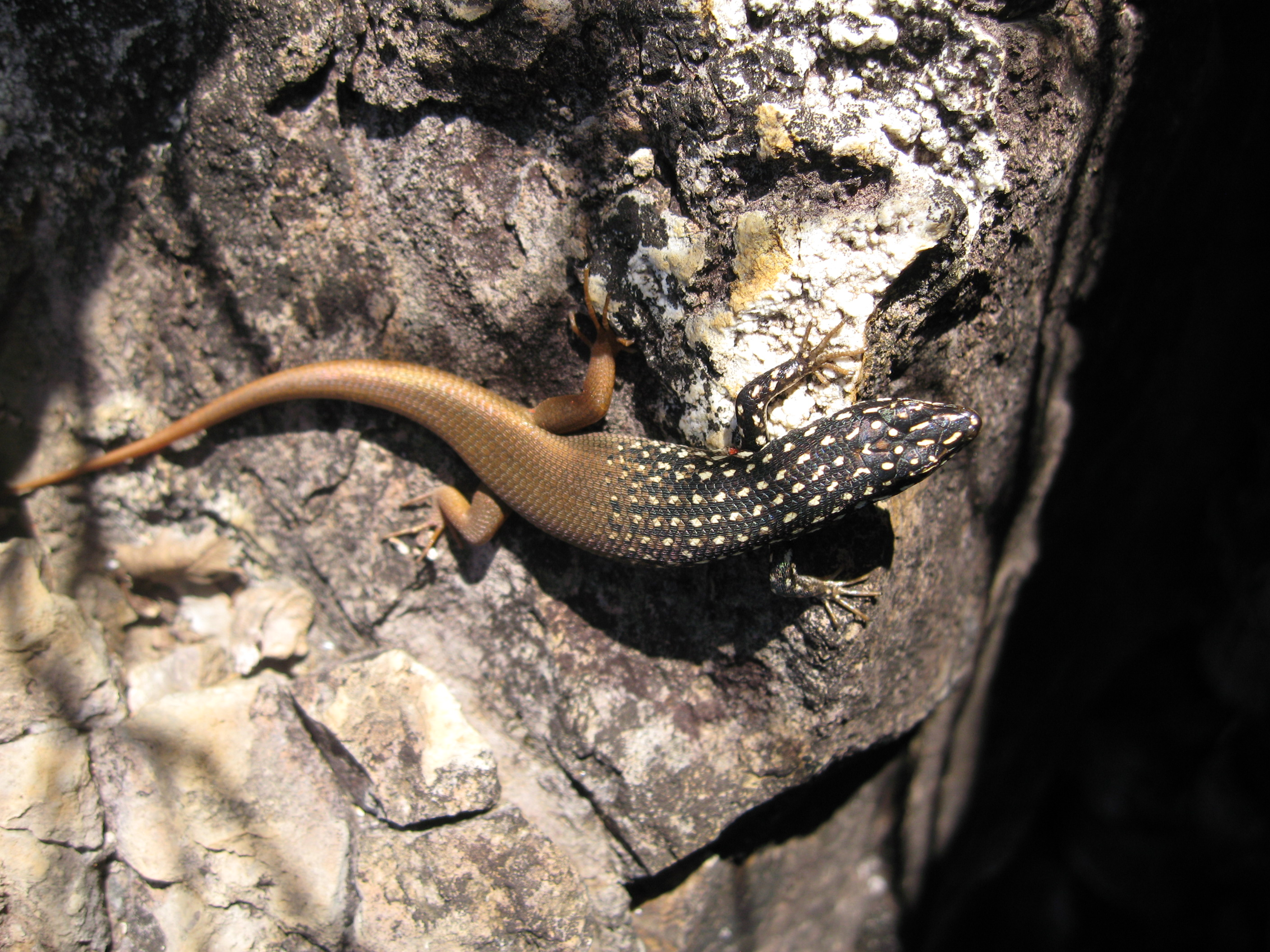

Conservation status
- Least Concern (IUCN 3.1)

Scientific classification
- Kingdom: Animalia
- Phylum: Chordata
- Class: Reptilia
- Order: Squamata
- Suborder: Scinciformata
- Infraorder: Scincomorpha
- Family: Mabuyidae
- Genus: Trachylepis
- Species: T. aureopunctata

Binomial name
- Trachylepis aureopunctata (Grandidier, 1867)

= Trachylepis aureopunctata =

Species of lizard

Trachylepis aureopunctata, the gold-spotted mabuya, is a species of skink. It is endemic to Madagascar.
