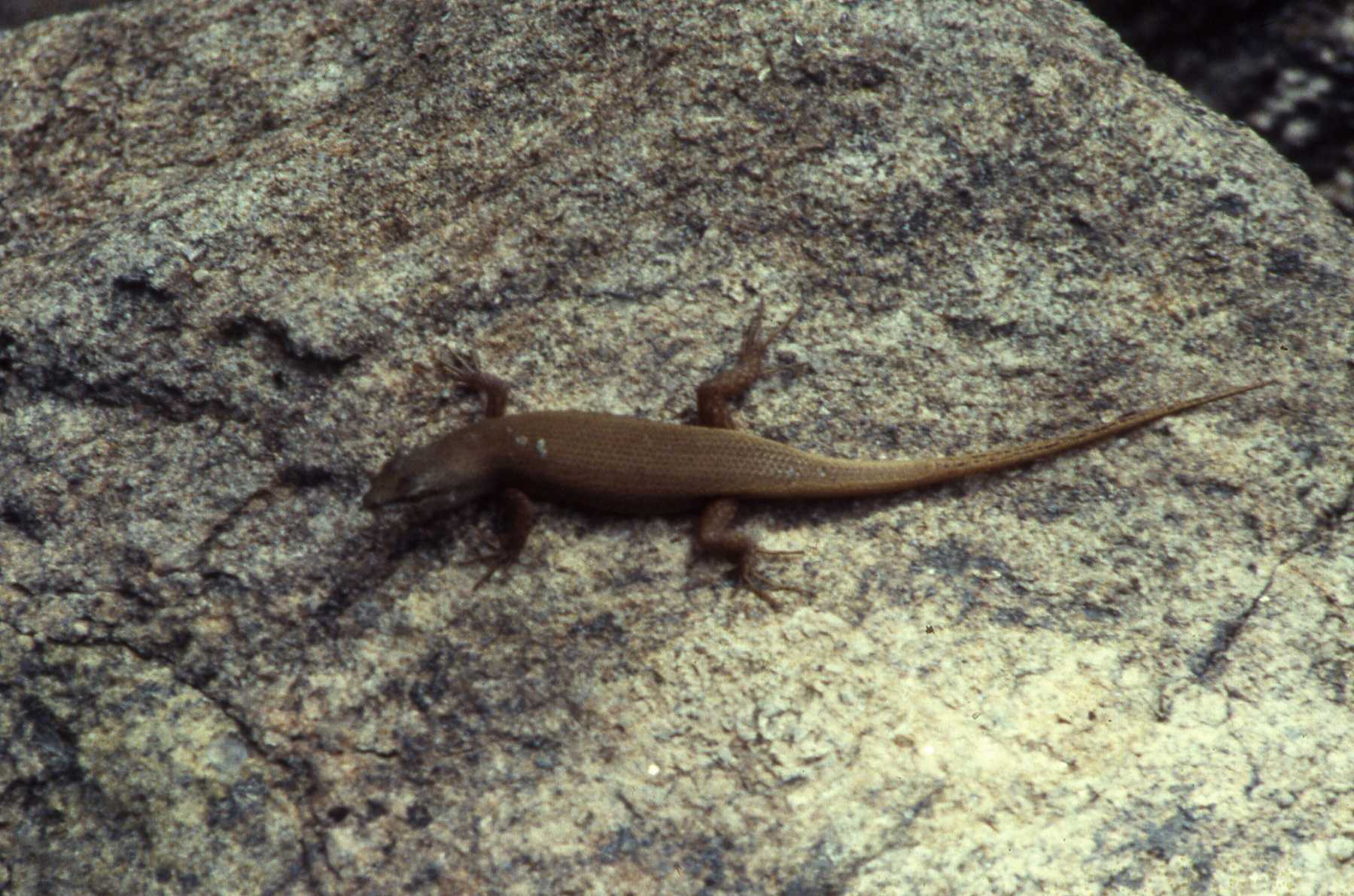

Conservation status
- Least Concern (IUCN 3.1)

Scientific classification
- Kingdom: Animalia
- Phylum: Chordata
- Class: Reptilia
- Order: Squamata
- Suborder: Scinciformata
- Infraorder: Scincomorpha
- Family: Mabuyidae
- Genus: Trachylepis
- Species: T. lacertiformis

Binomial name
- Trachylepis lacertiformis (Peters, 1854)
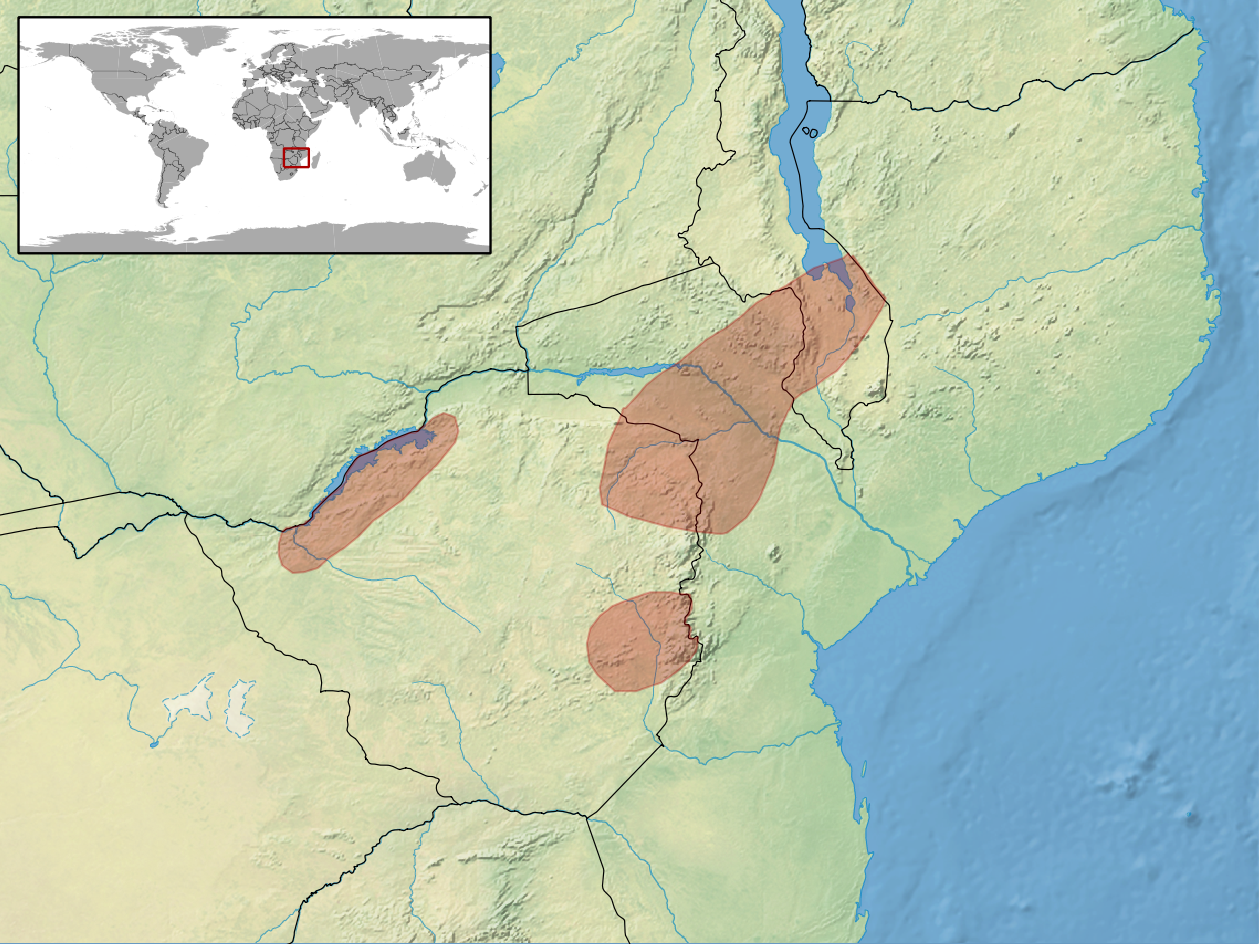

Synonyms
- Mabuya lacertiformis (Peters, 1854)

= Trachylepis lacertiformis =

Species of lizard

Trachylepis lacertiformis, the bronze rock skink, is a species of skink found in Zimbabwe, Angola, Malawi, and Mozambique.
