= Trachylepis keroanensis =

Conservation status
- Data Deficient (IUCN 3.1)

Scientific classification
- Kingdom: Animalia
- Phylum: Chordata
- Class: Reptilia
- Order: Squamata
- Suborder: Scinciformata
- Infraorder: Scincomorpha
- Family: Mabuyidae
- Genus: Trachylepis
- Species: T. keroanensis

Binomial name
- Trachylepis keroanensis (Chabanaud, 1921)

Species of lizard

The Teita mabuya (Trachylepis keroanensis) is a species of skink found in Guinea.
