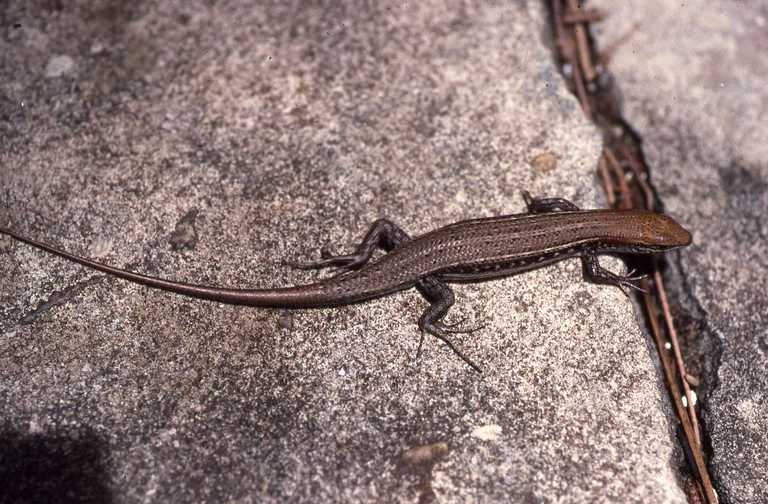

Conservation status
- Least Concern (IUCN 3.1)

Scientific classification
- Kingdom: Animalia
- Phylum: Chordata
- Class: Reptilia
- Order: Squamata
- Suborder: Scinciformata
- Infraorder: Scincomorpha
- Family: Mabuyidae
- Genus: Trachylepis
- Species: T. elegans

Binomial name
- Trachylepis elegans (Peters, 1854)
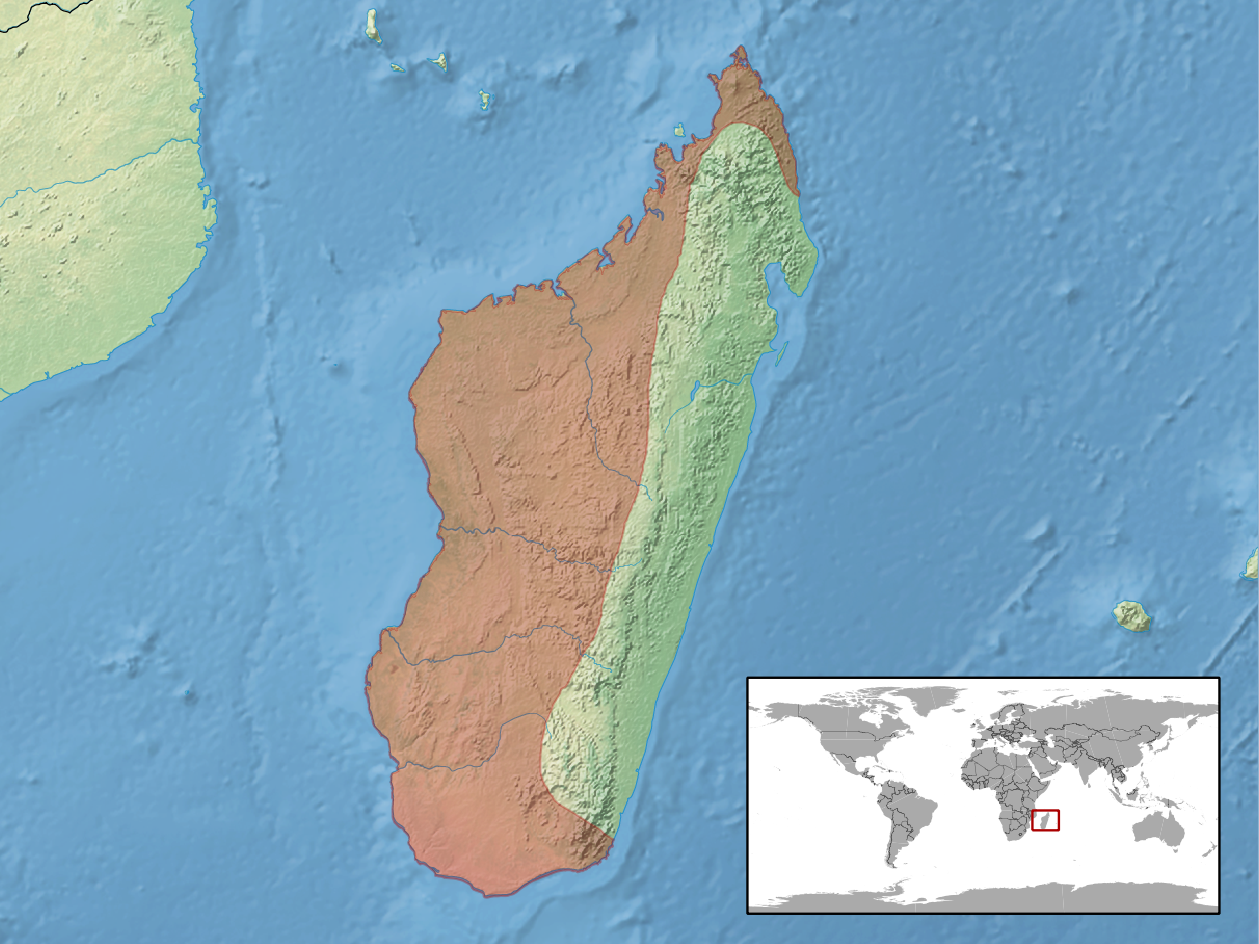

= Trachylepis elegans =

Species of lizard

The elegant mabuya (Trachylepis elegans) is a species of skink found in Madagascar.
