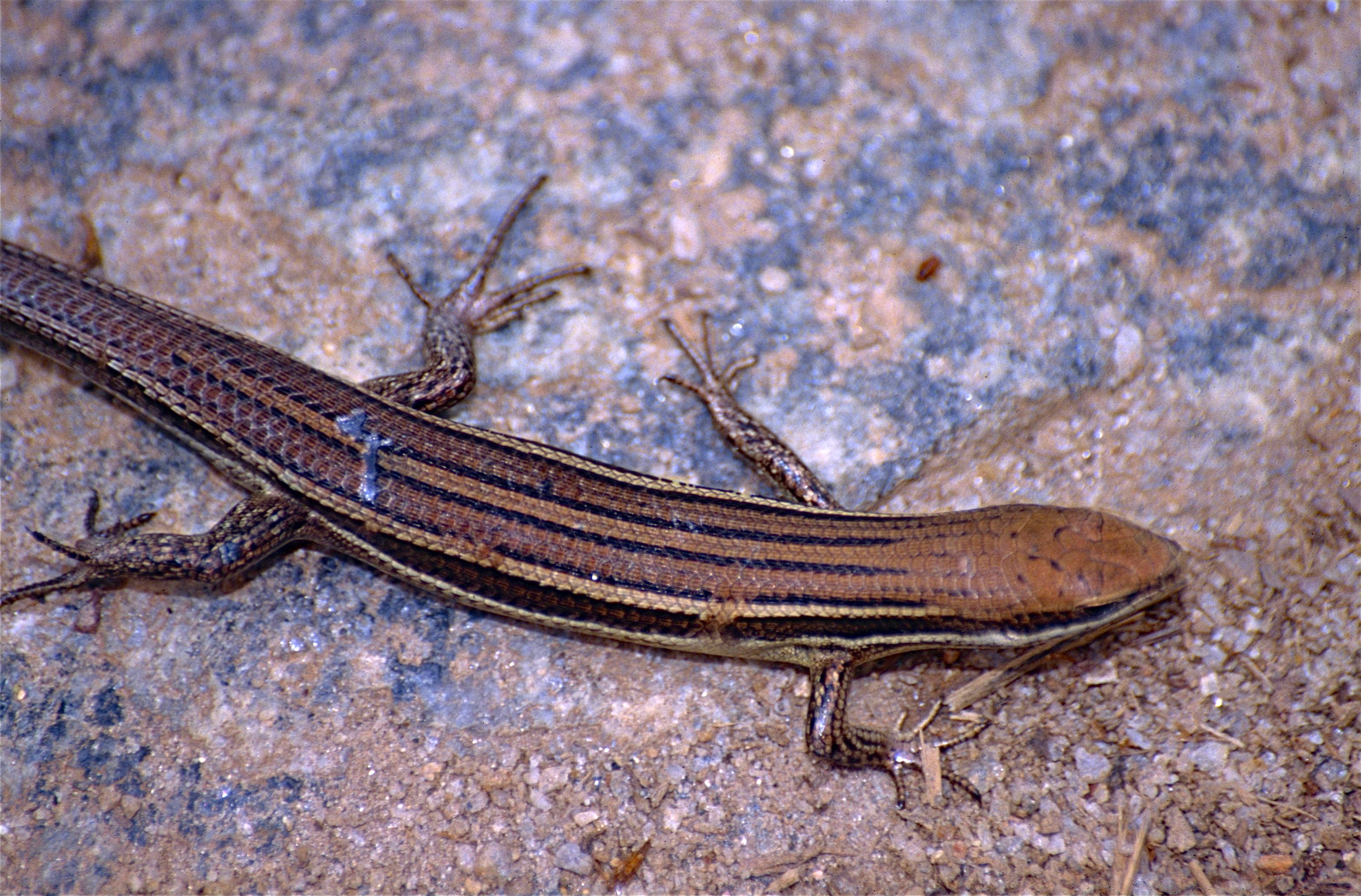

Conservation status
- Least Concern (IUCN 3.1)

Scientific classification
- Kingdom: Animalia
- Phylum: Chordata
- Class: Reptilia
- Order: Squamata
- Family: Scincidae
- Genus: Trachylepis
- Species: T. boettgeri

Binomial name
- Trachylepis boettgeri (Boulenger, 1887)
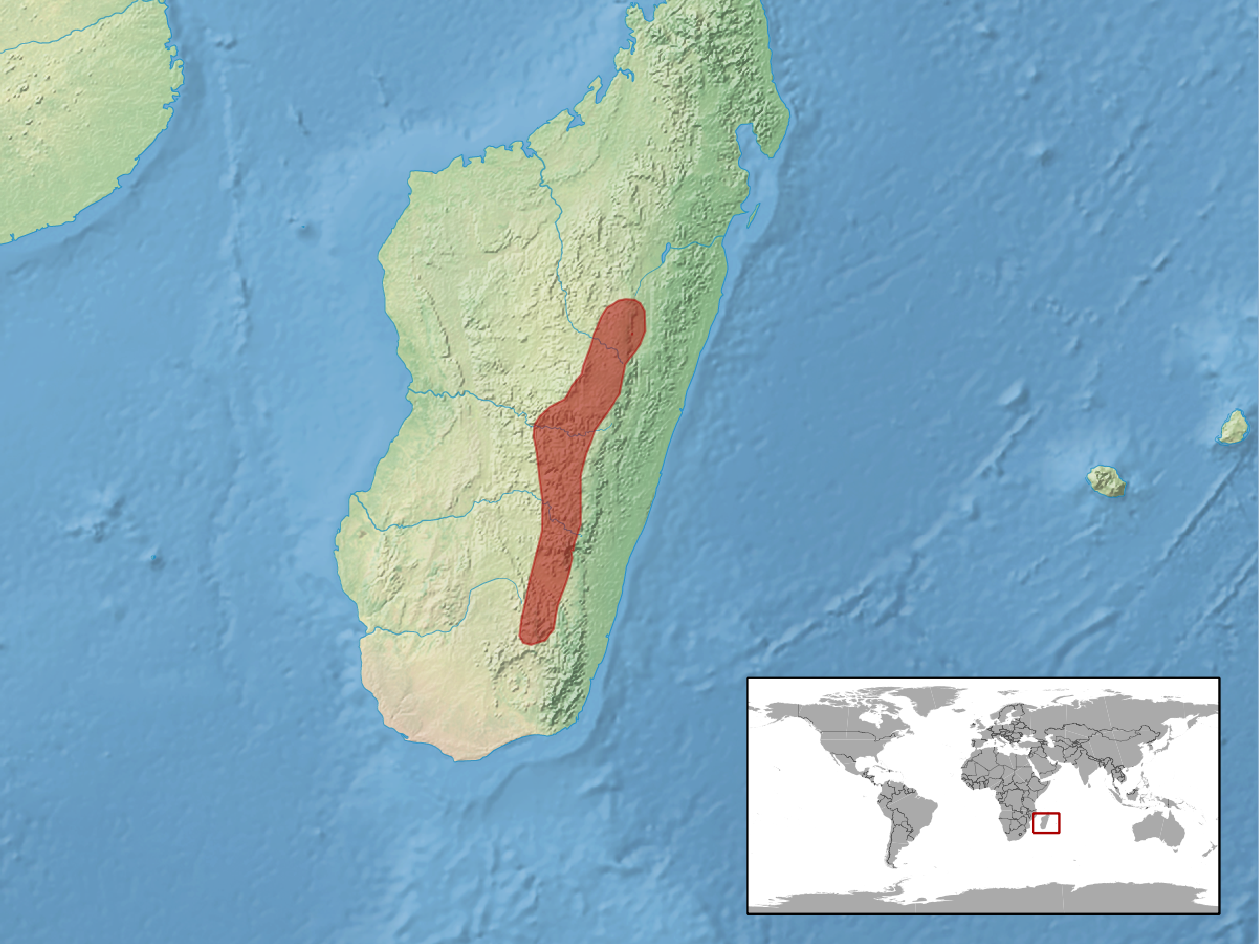

Synonyms
- Mabuia boettgeri Boulenger, 1887; Mabuya boettgeri — Angel, 1942; Euprepis boettgeri — Mausfeld & Schmitz, 2003; Trachylepis boettgeri — Bauer, 2003

= Trachylepis boettgeri =

Species of lizard

Trachylepis boettgeri, commonly known as Boettger's mabuya, is a species of skink, a lizard in the family Scincidae. The species is endemic to Madagascar.

== Etymology ==
Both the specific name, boettgeri, and the common name, Boettger's mabuya, are in honor of German herpetologist Oskar Boettger.

== Habitat ==
The preferred natural habitats of T. boettgeri are grassland, shrubland, and freshwater wetlands, at altitudes from 890–2,000 m (2,920–6,560 ft).

== Behavior ==
T. boettgeri is terrestrial and diurnal.

== Reproduction ==
T. boettgeri is oviparous.
