= Trachylepis betsileana =

Conservation status
- Data Deficient (IUCN 3.1)

Scientific classification
- Kingdom: Animalia
- Phylum: Chordata
- Class: Reptilia
- Order: Squamata
- Suborder: Scinciformata
- Infraorder: Scincomorpha
- Family: Mabuyidae
- Genus: Trachylepis
- Species: T. betsileana

Binomial name
- Trachylepis betsileana (Mocquard, 1906)

Species of lizard

The Betsileo mabuya (Trachylepis betsileana) is a species of skink possibly found in Madagascar. This species hasn't been recorded from Madagascar for about 100 years. It is probably a mislabelled specimen from Africa, not Madagascar. It is only known from the type specimen.
