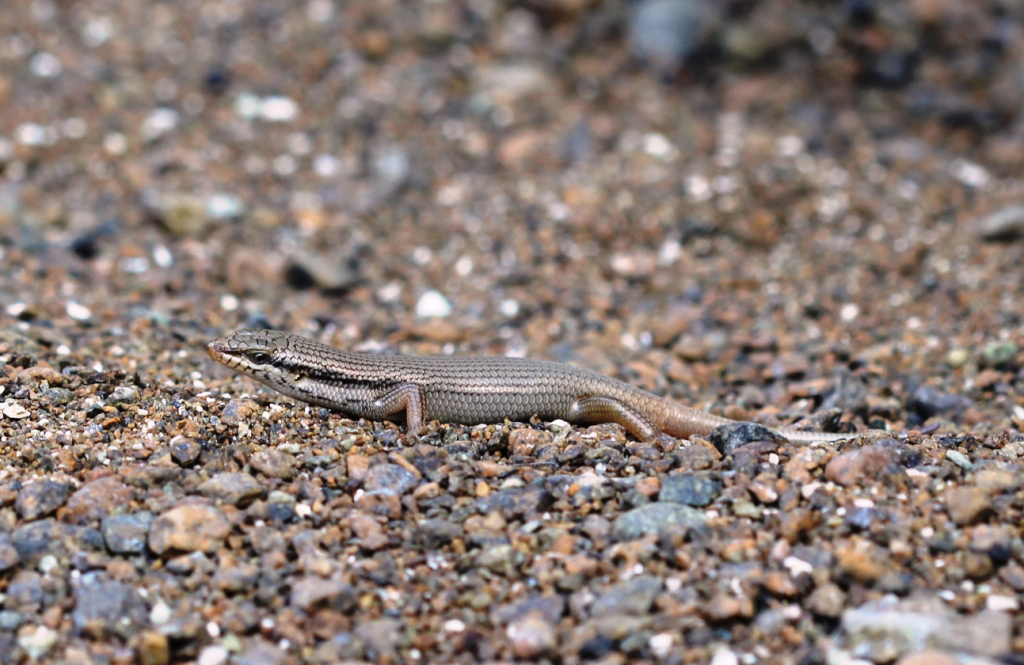
- Wadi Wurrayah, Fujairah, United Arab Emirates

Conservation status
- Least Concern (IUCN 3.1)

Scientific classification
- Kingdom: Animalia
- Phylum: Chordata
- Class: Reptilia
- Order: Squamata
- Family: Scincidae
- Genus: Trachylepis
- Species: T. tessellata

Binomial name
- Trachylepis tessellata (Anderson, 1895)

= Trachylepis tessellata =

Species of lizard

Trachylepis tessellata, the tessellated mabuya, is a species of skink found in Yemen, Oman, Saudi Arabia and the United Arab Emirates.
