= Trachylepis infralineata =

Scientific classification
- Domain: Eukaryota
- Kingdom: Animalia
- Phylum: Chordata
- Class: Reptilia
- Order: Squamata
- Family: Scincidae
- Genus: Trachylepis
- Species: T. infralineata

Binomial name
- Trachylepis infralineata (Boettger, 1913)

Species of lizard

Trachylepis infralineata is a species of skink found on Europa Island.
