= Trachylepis brevicollis =

Conservation status
- Least Concern (IUCN 3.1)

Scientific classification
- Kingdom: Animalia
- Phylum: Chordata
- Class: Reptilia
- Order: Squamata
- Family: Scincidae
- Genus: Trachylepis
- Species: T. brevicollis

Binomial name
- Trachylepis brevicollis (Wiegmann, 1837)

Species of lizard

Trachylepis brevicollis, the short-necked skink or Sudan mabuya, is a species of skink in the family Scincidae. It is distributed across northeastern and eastern Africa and the southern Arabian Peninsula.

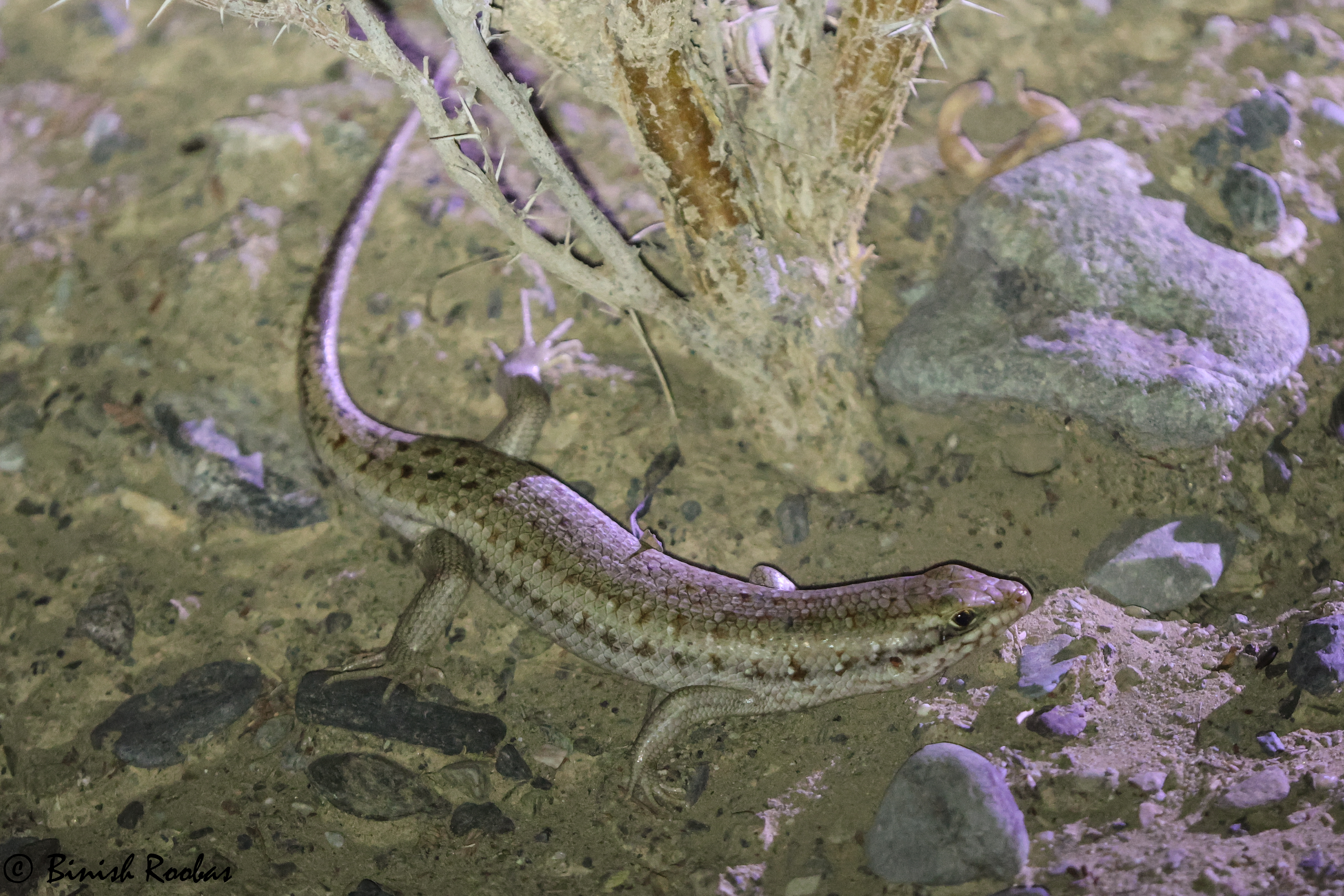
Trachylepis brevicollis from Saudi Arabia

== Taxonomy and etymology ==
The species was originally described by Wiegmann in 1837 as Euprepes brevicollis. It was later placed in the genus Mabuya before being transferred to the genus Trachylepis following taxonomic revision of African mabuyine skinks.

The specific epithet brevicollis is derived from Latin, meaning “short-necked”, referring to the species’ relatively stout neck.

== Description ==
Trachylepis brevicollis is a relatively large and robust skink, reaching a snout–vent length of approximately 140 mm. The body is cylindrical with well-developed limbs. Dorsal and lateral scales are strongly keeled, often with double keels, giving the skin a rough texture. The neck is not particularly short, but the head is short and broad with five supralabial scales anterior to the eye, and the first supraocular scale contacts the frontal scale. The eye is large with a round pupil. The tail is about half the skink's total length and is stout at its base.

Adult size may reach up to 32 cm, however the average length is 18-26 cm. Hatchlings are between 7-9 cm in length.

Coloration is variable. Juveniles typically exhibit bold dark and light patterning, while adults tend to be more uniformly brown or grey. In some populations, particularly in Arabia, adult males may show orange or reddish coloration along the flanks and sides of the body.

== Distribution and habitat ==
The species occurs in Sudan, South Sudan, Eritrea, Ethiopia, Somalia, Kenya, Uganda, Tanzania, Yemen, Saudi Arabia, and Oman from sea level to about 1500m.

Trachylepis brevicollis inhabits open and semi-arid environments, including savanna, scrubland, rocky terrain, agricultural areas, and disturbed habitats. It is often found on the ground or among low vegetation and human-modified landscapes.

== Ecology and behavior ==
This species is diurnal and primarily terrestrial. Individuals are commonly observed basking in sunlight and actively foraging during the day. Like other members of the genus, it is presumed to be insectivorous, feeding mainly on small invertebrates, although detailed dietary studies are lacking.

== Reproduction ==
Trachylepis brevicollis is ovoviviparous, with females giving birth to live young rather than laying eggs, a reproductive mode typical of many African mabuyine skinks.

== Conservation status ==
The species is assessed as Least Concern on the IUCN Red List due to its wide distribution, presumed large population, and tolerance of habitat disturbance. No major threats have been identified at a global scale.
