= Trachylepis rodenburgi =

Conservation status
- Least Concern (IUCN 3.1)

Scientific classification
- Kingdom: Animalia
- Phylum: Chordata
- Class: Reptilia
- Order: Squamata
- Family: Scincidae
- Genus: Trachylepis
- Species: T. rodenburgi

Binomial name
- Trachylepis rodenburgi (Hoogmoed, 1974)

Synonyms
- Mabuya rodenburgi Hoogmoed, 1974; Euprepis rodenburgi — Mausfeld et al., 2002; Trachylepis rodenburgi — Bauer, 2003

Species of lizard

Trachylepis rodenburgi, also known commonly as Rodenburg's mabuya, is a species of skink, a lizard in the family Scincidae. The species is endemic to West Africa.

== Etymology ==
The specific name, rodenburgi, is in honor of the collector of the holotype, Willem F. Rodenburg.

== Geographic range ==
T. rodenburgi is found in Ghana and Nigeria.

== Habitat ==
The natural habitat of T. rodenburgi is rocky areas.

== Reproduction ==
The mode of reproduction of T. rodenburgi is unknown.
