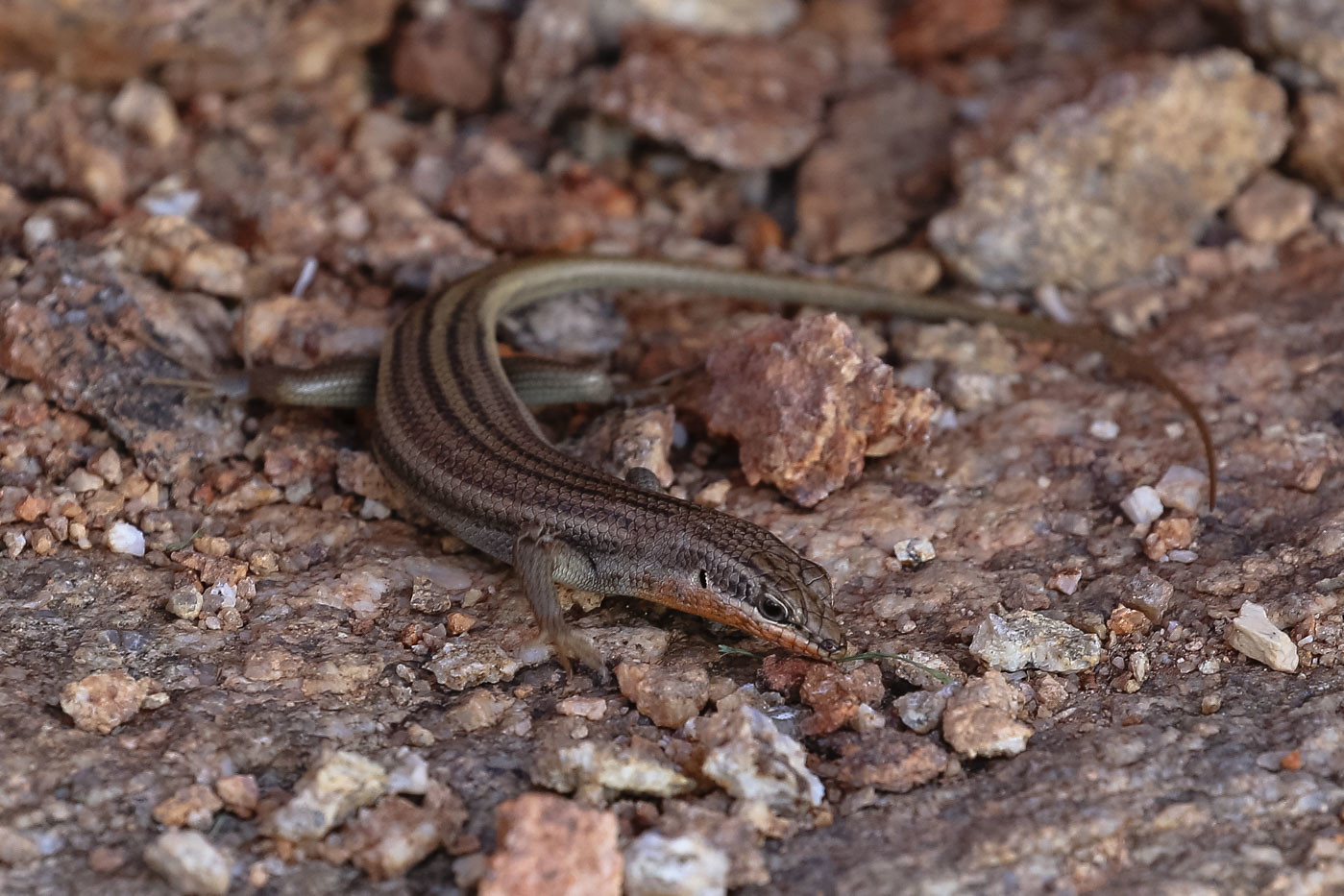

Scientific classification
- Domain: Eukaryota
- Kingdom: Animalia
- Phylum: Chordata
- Class: Reptilia
- Order: Squamata
- Family: Scincidae
- Genus: Trachylepis
- Species: T. occidentalis

Binomial name
- Trachylepis occidentalis (Peters, 1867)

= Trachylepis occidentalis =

Species of lizard

The western three-striped skink (Trachylepis occidentalis) is a species of skink found in Namibia, South Africa, Botswana, and Angola.
