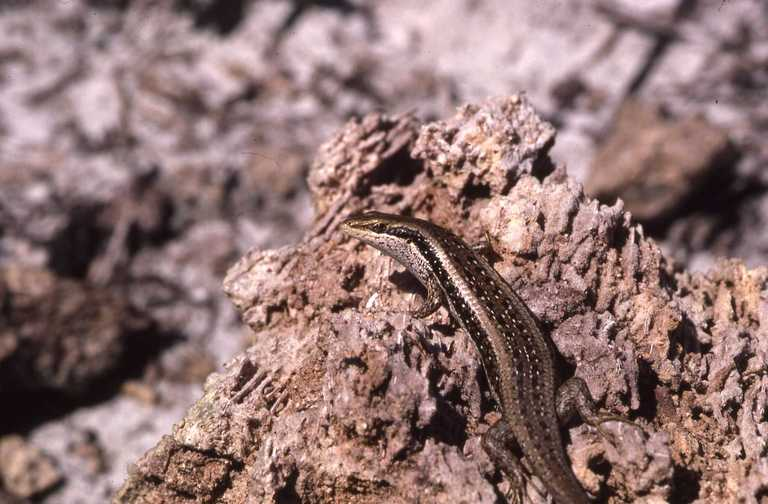

Scientific classification
- Domain: Eukaryota
- Kingdom: Animalia
- Phylum: Chordata
- Class: Reptilia
- Order: Squamata
- Family: Scincidae
- Genus: Trachylepis
- Species: T. planifrons

Binomial name
- Trachylepis planifrons (Peters, 1878)

= Trachylepis planifrons =

Species of lizard

The tree skink (Trachylepis planifrons) is a species of skink found in Africa.
