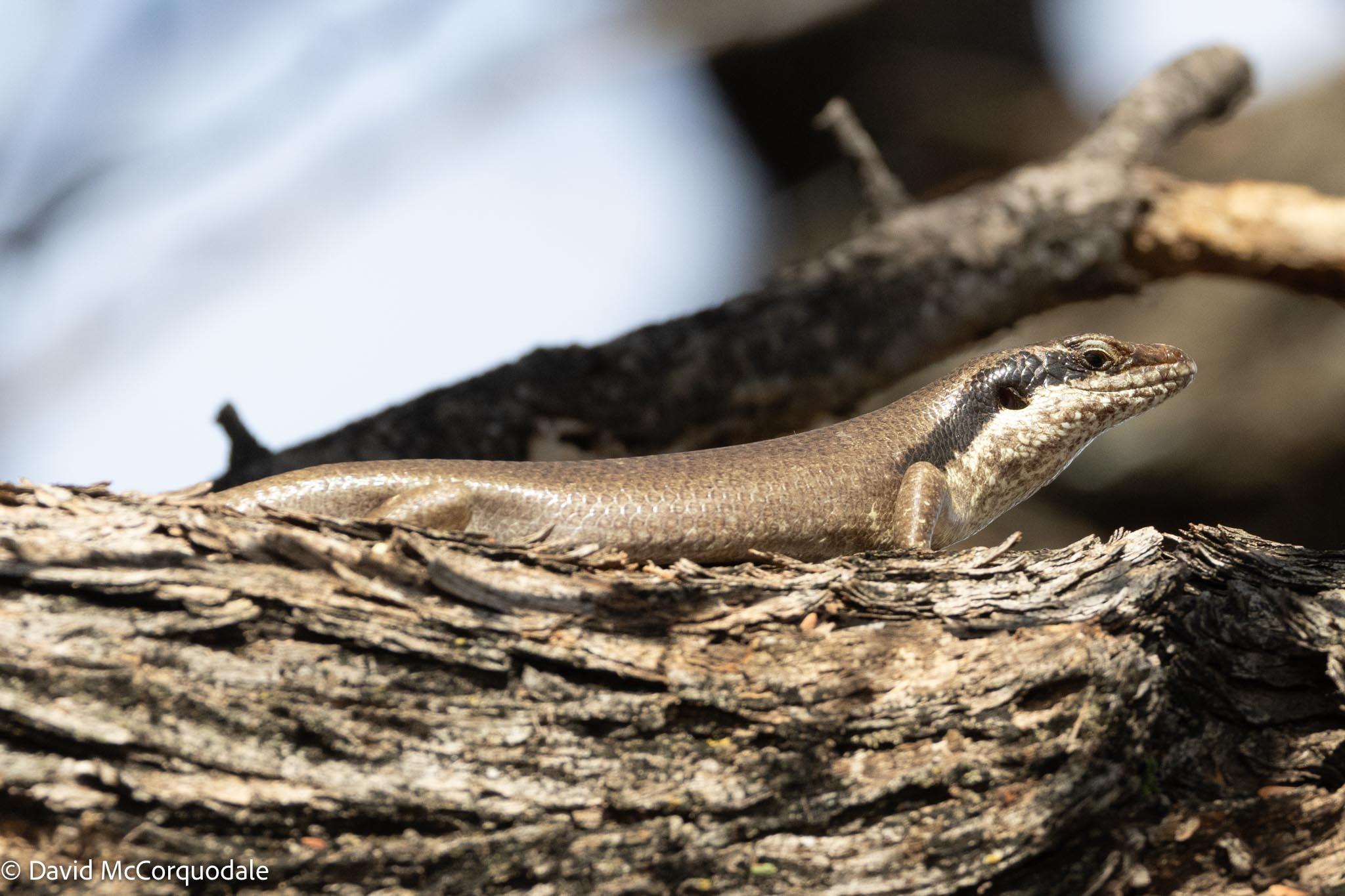

Scientific classification
- Kingdom: Animalia
- Phylum: Chordata
- Class: Reptilia
- Order: Squamata
- Family: Scincidae
- Genus: Trachylepis
- Species: T. binotata

Binomial name
- Trachylepis binotata (Bocage, 1867)

= Trachylepis binotata =

Species of lizard

Trachylepis binotata, the Ovambo tree skink or Bocage's mabuya, is a species of skink from Namibia and Angola.
