= Trachylepis ozorii =

Conservation status
- Least Concern (IUCN 3.1)

Scientific classification
- Kingdom: Animalia
- Phylum: Chordata
- Class: Reptilia
- Order: Squamata
- Family: Scincidae
- Genus: Trachylepis
- Species: T. ozorii

Binomial name
- Trachylepis ozorii (Bocage, 1893)

Synonyms
- Mabuia ozorii Bocage, 1893; Mabuya ozorii — Jesus et al., 2005; Trachylepis ozorii — Ceríaco, 2015

Species of lizard

Trachylepis ozorii is a species of skink, a lizard in the subfamily Lygosominae of the family Scincidae. The species is endemic to the island of Annobón in Equatorial Guinea.

== Taxonomy ==
The species Trachylepis ozorii was originally described and named Mabuia ozorii by José Vicente Barbosa du Bocage in 1893.

== Etymology ==
The specific name, ozorii, is in honor of Portuguese ichthyologist and naturalist Balthazar Osorio (1855–1926).
