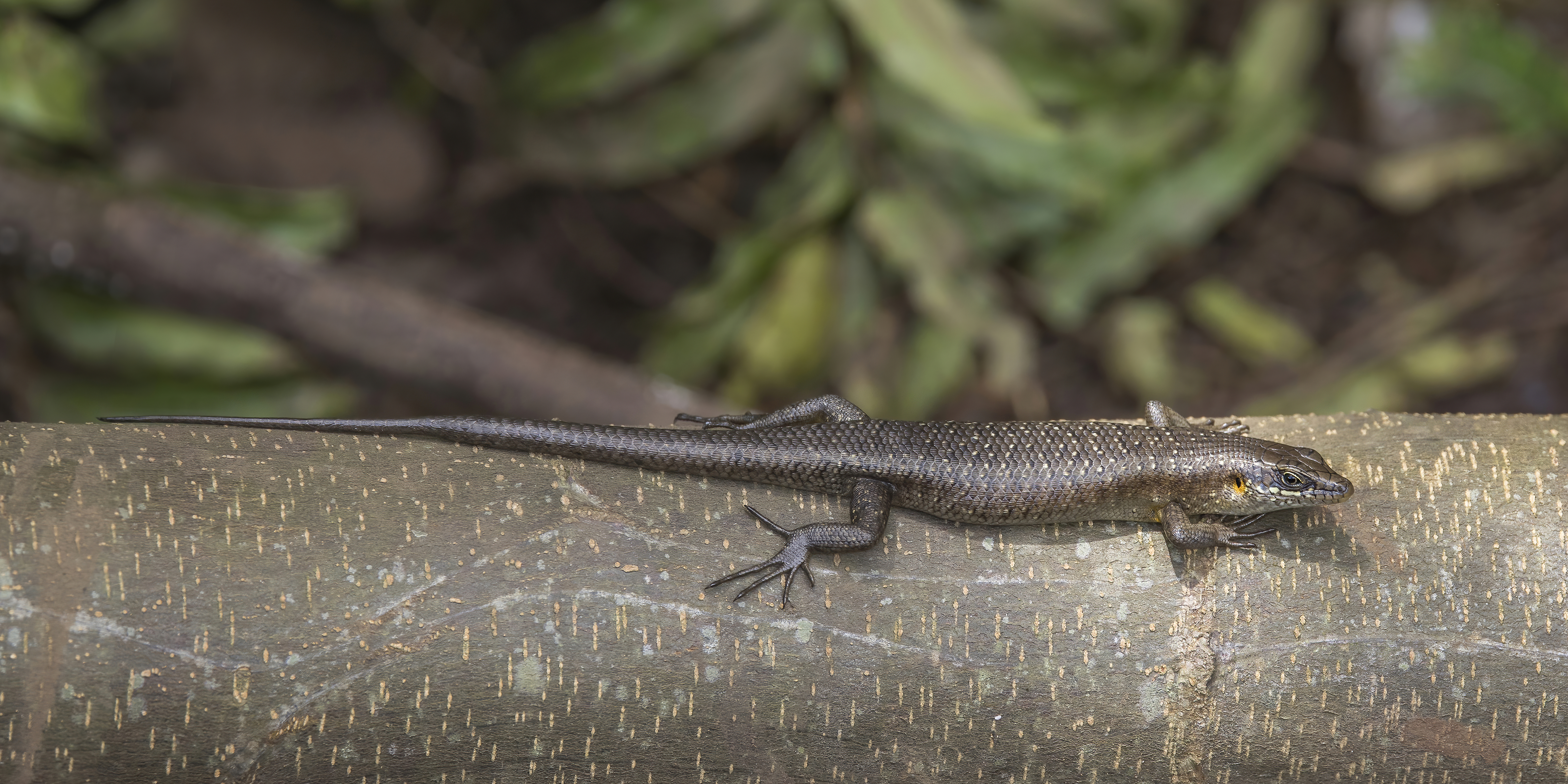

Scientific classification
- Domain: Eukaryota
- Kingdom: Animalia
- Phylum: Chordata
- Class: Reptilia
- Order: Squamata
- Family: Scincidae
- Genus: Trachylepis
- Species: T. thomensis

Binomial name
- Trachylepis thomensis Ceríaco, Marques, & Bauer, 2016

= Trachylepis thomensis =

Species of lizard

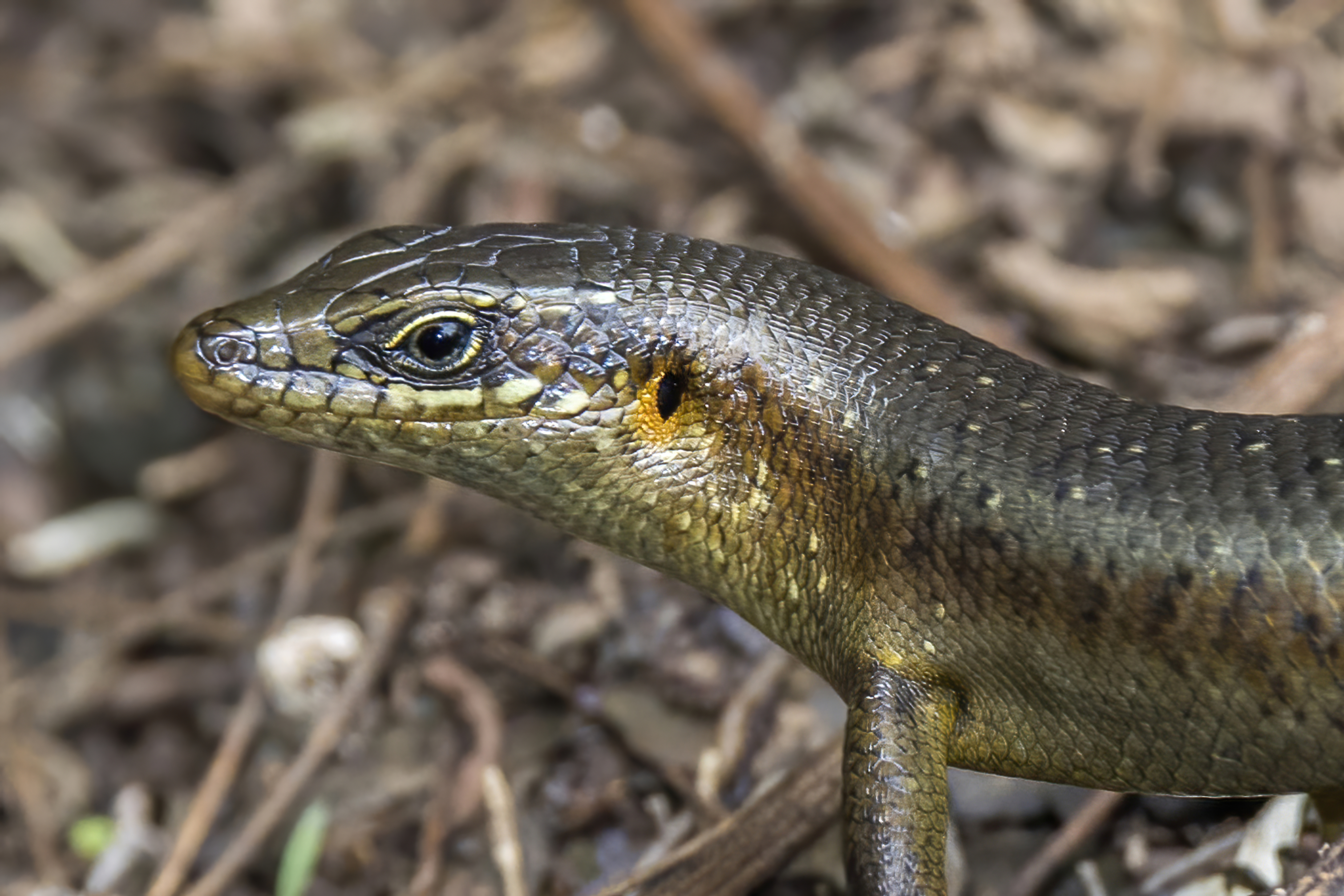

Trachylepis thomensis, the São Tomé skink, is a species of skink found in São Tomé.
