= Trachylepis mlanjensis =

Scientific classification
- Domain: Eukaryota
- Kingdom: Animalia
- Phylum: Chordata
- Class: Reptilia
- Order: Squamata
- Family: Scincidae
- Genus: Trachylepis
- Species: T. mlanjensis

Binomial name
- Trachylepis mlanjensis (Loveridge, 1953)

Species of lizard

The Mulanje skink (Trachylepis mlanjensis) is a species of skink found in Malawi.
