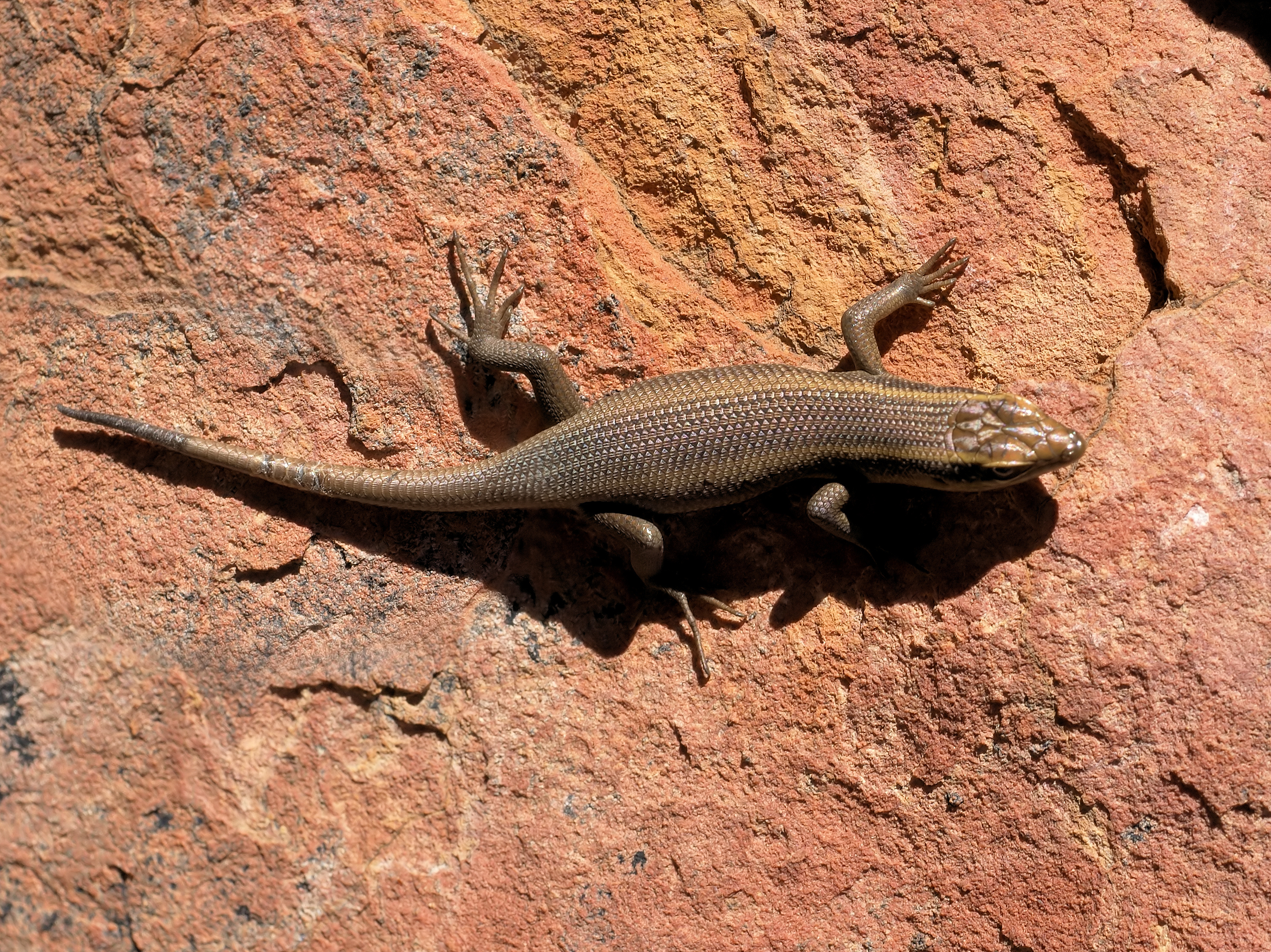

Scientific classification
- Domain: Eukaryota
- Kingdom: Animalia
- Phylum: Chordata
- Class: Reptilia
- Order: Squamata
- Family: Scincidae
- Genus: Trachylepis
- Species: T. sulcata

Binomial name
- Trachylepis sulcata (Peters, 1867)

= Trachylepis sulcata =

Species of lizard

The western rock skink (Trachylepis sulcata) is a species of skink found in Namibia,Nigeria, South Africa, West Africa and Angola.
