= Trachylepis ferrarai =

Conservation status
- Data Deficient (IUCN 3.1)

Scientific classification
- Kingdom: Animalia
- Phylum: Chordata
- Class: Reptilia
- Order: Squamata
- Family: Scincidae
- Genus: Trachylepis
- Species: T. ferrarai

Binomial name
- Trachylepis ferrarai (Lanza, 1978)

Synonyms
- Mabuya ferrarai Lanza, 1978; Euprepis ferrarai — Mausfeld et al., 2002; Trachylepis ferrarai — Bauer, 2003

Species of lizard

Trachylepis ferrarai, also known commonly as Ferrara's mabuya, is a species of skink, a lizard in the family Scincidae. The species is endemic to Somalia.

== Etymology ==
The specific name, ferrarai, is in honor of Italian zoologist Franco Ferrara, who studies isopods.

== Habitat ==
The preferred natural habitat of T. ferrarai is forest.

== Description ==
A medium-sized species for its genus, adults of T. ferrarai have a snout-to-vent length (SVL) of 6.7–7.5 cm (2.6–3.0 in).

== Reproduction ==
The mode of reproduction of T. ferrarai is unknown.
