= Trachylepis casuarinae =

Scientific classification
- Domain: Eukaryota
- Kingdom: Animalia
- Phylum: Chordata
- Class: Reptilia
- Order: Squamata
- Family: Scincidae
- Genus: Trachylepis
- Species: T. casuarinae

Binomial name
- Trachylepis casuarinae (Broadley, 1974)

Species of lizard

The Casuarina Island skink (Trachylepis casuarinae) is a species of skink found on Casuarina Island in Mozambique.
