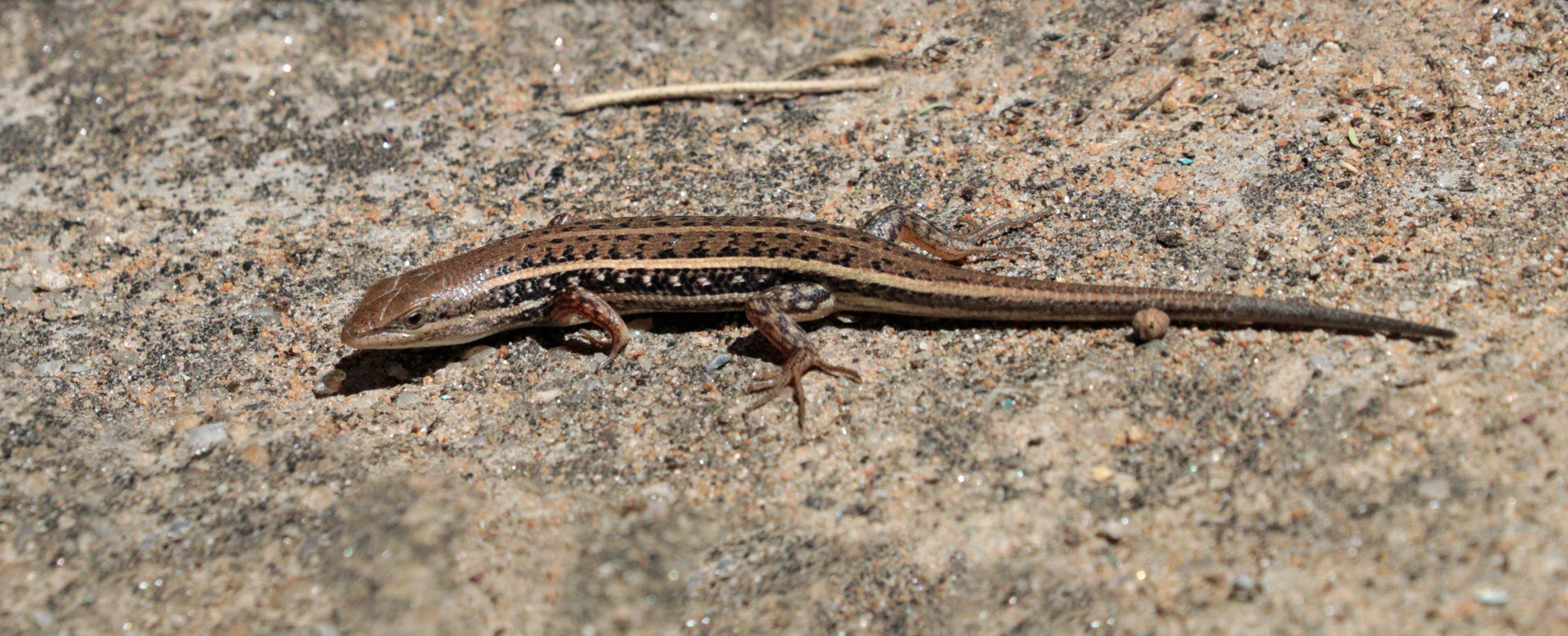
- Windhoek Botanical Gardens, Namibia

Conservation status
- Least Concern (IUCN 3.1)

Scientific classification
- Domain: Eukaryota
- Kingdom: Animalia
- Phylum: Chordata
- Class: Reptilia
- Order: Squamata
- Family: Scincidae
- Genus: Trachylepis
- Species: T. acutilabris

Binomial name
- Trachylepis acutilabris (Peters, 1862)

Synonyms
- Mabuya acutilabris (Peters, 1862)

= Trachylepis acutilabris =

Species of lizard

The wedge-snouted skink or sharp-lipped mabuya (Trachylepis acutilabris) is a species of skink found in Namibia, Angola, Democratic Republic of the Congo, and South Africa.
