= Trachylepis boehmei =

Scientific classification
- Kingdom: Animalia
- Phylum: Chordata
- Class: Reptilia
- Order: Squamata
- Family: Scincidae
- Genus: Trachylepis
- Species: T. boehmei

Binomial name
- Trachylepis boehmei Koppetsch, 2020

Species of lizard

Böhme's grass skink (Trachylepis boehmei) is a species of lizard in the family Scincidae. The species is endemic to Ethiopia. It was first described in 2020.

== Etymology ==
The specific name, boehmei, is in honor of German Herpetologist Wolfgang Böhme.

== Description ==
Small for its genus, T. boehmei may attain a snout-to-vent length (SVL) of 5.5 cm (2.2 in), and a tail length of about 1.3 times SVL, which is relatively short for the genus.

== Reproduction ==
T. boehmei is ovoviviparous.
