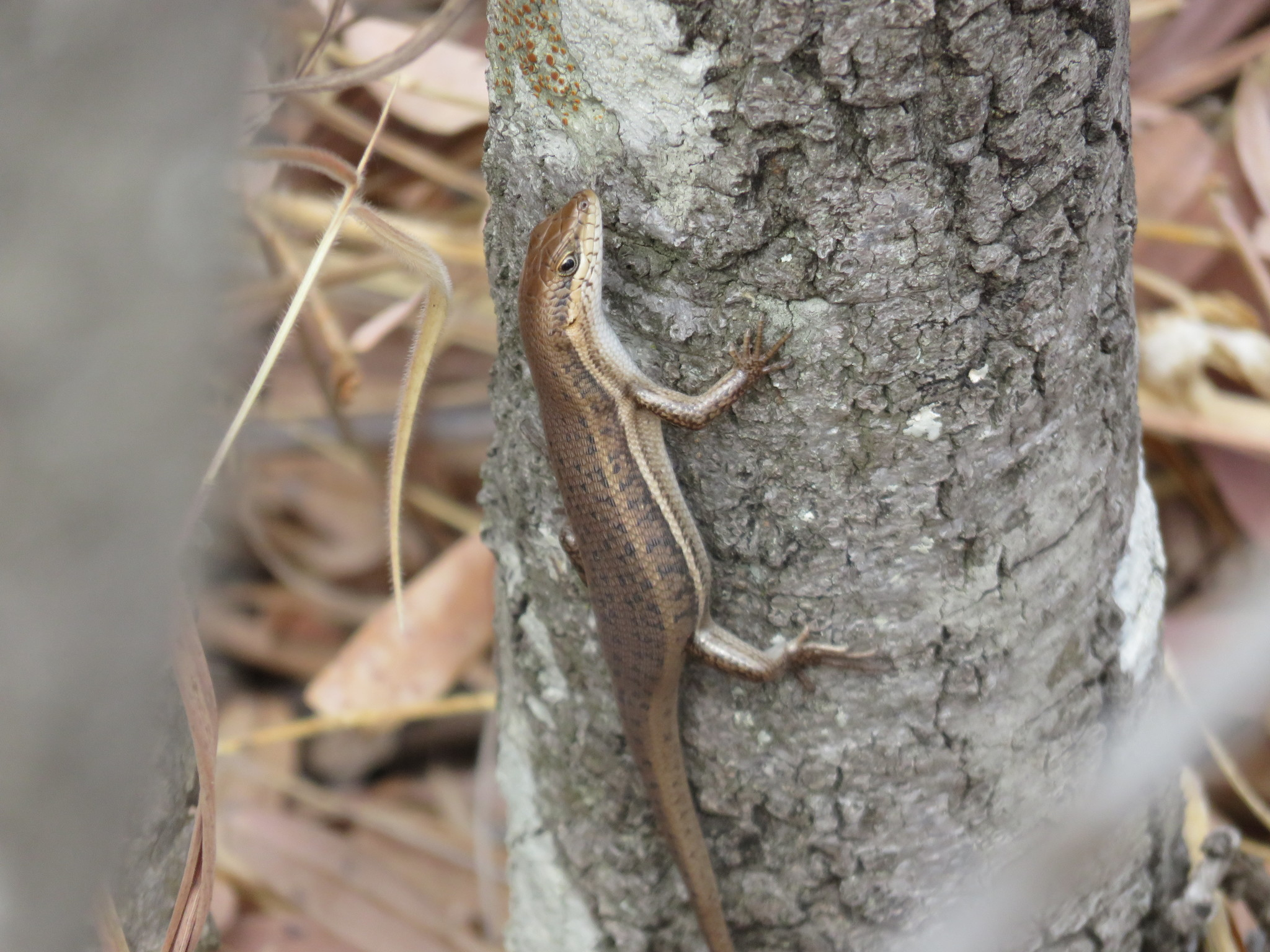

Conservation status
- Least Concern (IUCN 3.1)

Scientific classification
- Kingdom: Animalia
- Phylum: Chordata
- Class: Reptilia
- Order: Squamata
- Suborder: Scinciformata
- Infraorder: Scincomorpha
- Family: Mabuyidae
- Genus: Trachylepis
- Species: T. damarana

Binomial name
- Trachylepis damarana (Peters, 1870)

Synonyms
- Euprepes damaranus Peters, 1870

= Trachylepis damarana =

Species of lizard

Trachylepis damarana, also known as the Damara skink or Damara variable skink, is a species of skink. It is found in southern Africa, specifically in south-eastern Angola, northern Namibia, western Zambia, northern and eastern Botswana, Zimbabwe, north-eastern South Africa, and western Mozambique.

Trachylepis damarana is a very common terrestrial skink inhabiting open, rocky habitats in savanna. It has fully developed limbs and can reach 68 mm (2.7 in) in snout–vent length.
