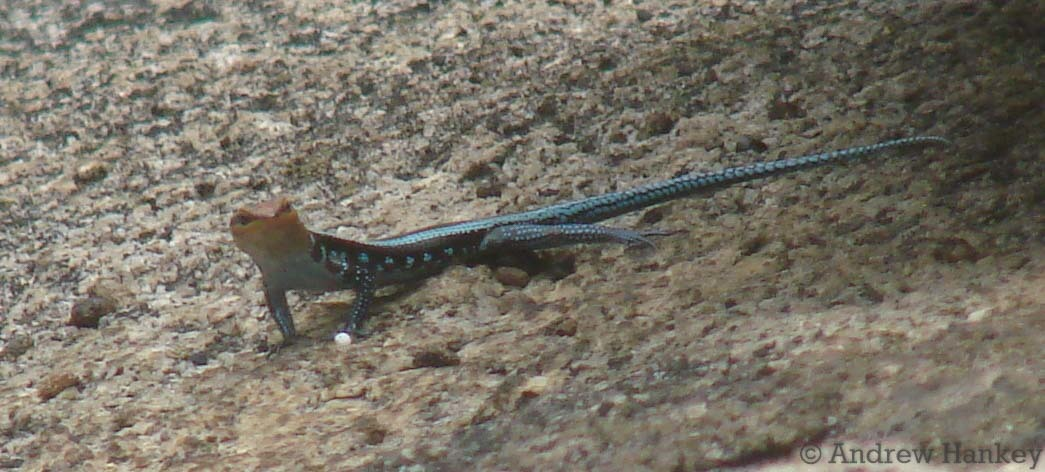

Scientific classification
- Domain: Eukaryota
- Kingdom: Animalia
- Phylum: Chordata
- Class: Reptilia
- Order: Squamata
- Family: Scincidae
- Genus: Trachylepis
- Species: T. laevis

Binomial name
- Trachylepis laevis (Boulenger, 1907)

= Trachylepis laevis =

Species of lizard

The Angolan blue-tailed skink (Trachylepis laevis) is a species of skink found in Namibia and Angola.
