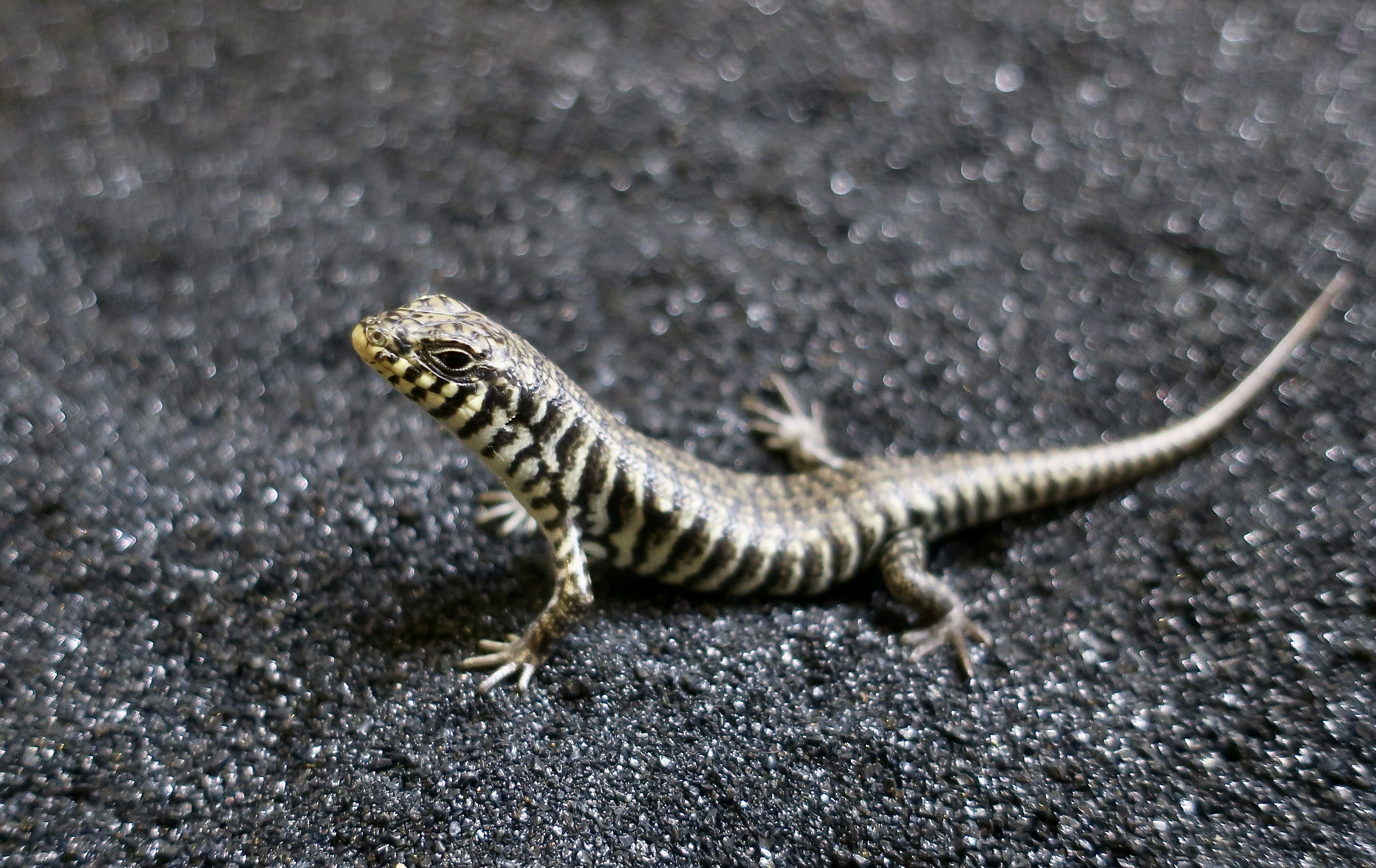

Conservation status
- Least Concern (IUCN 3.1)

Scientific classification
- Kingdom: Animalia
- Phylum: Chordata
- Class: Reptilia
- Order: Squamata
- Family: Scincidae
- Genus: Trachylepis
- Species: T. dichroma

Binomial name
- Trachylepis dichroma Günther, Whiting, & Bauer, 2005

= Trachylepis dichroma =

Species of lizard

Trachylepis dichroma, the two-coloured skink, also known as the Kenyan zebra skink, is a species of skink found in Kenya and Tanzania.
