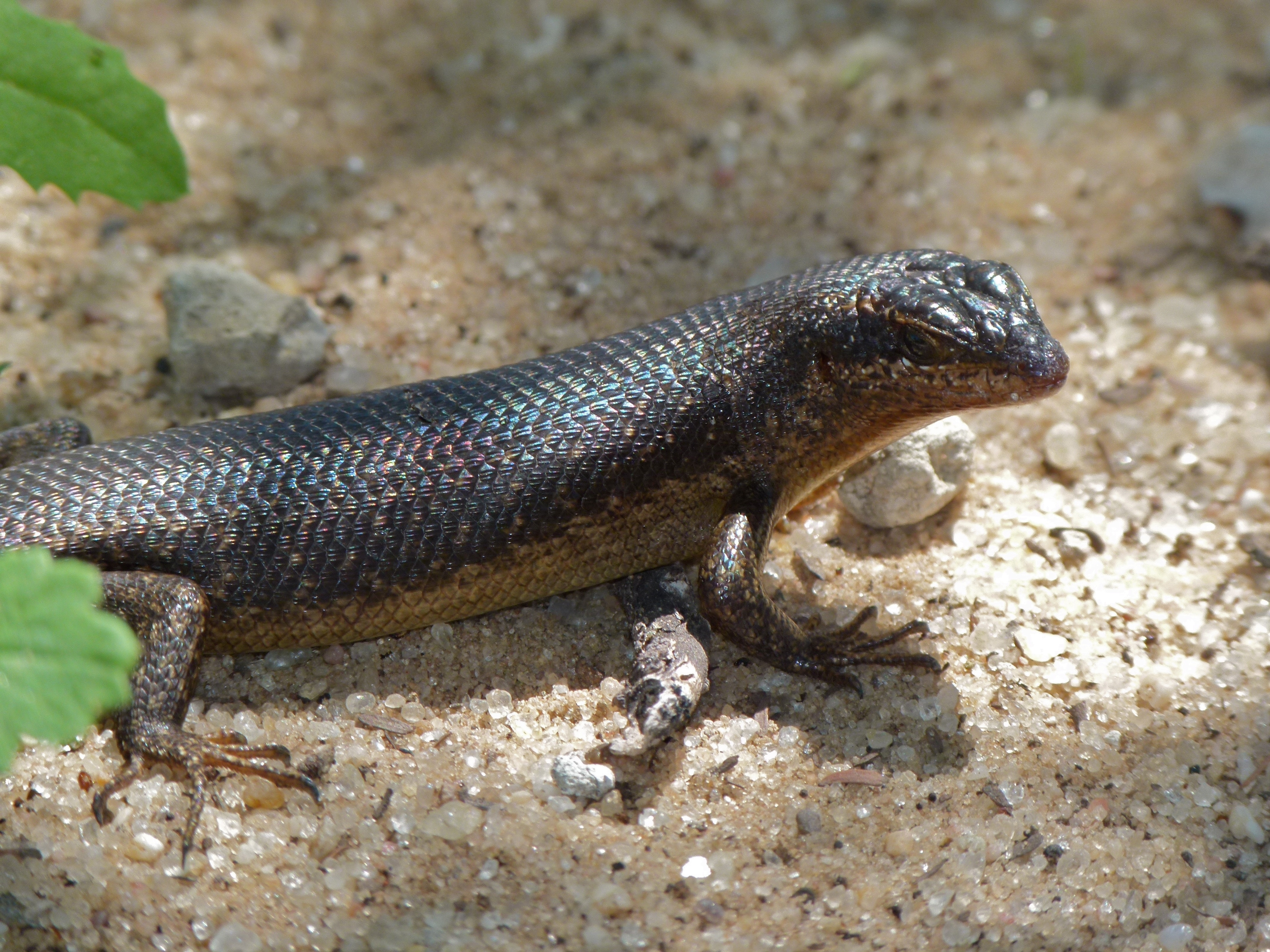

Scientific classification
- Domain: Eukaryota
- Kingdom: Animalia
- Phylum: Chordata
- Class: Reptilia
- Order: Squamata
- Family: Scincidae
- Genus: Trachylepis
- Species: T. sparsa

Binomial name
- Trachylepis sparsa (Mertens, 1954)

= Trachylepis sparsa =

Species of lizard

The Karasburg tree skink (Trachylepis sparsa) is a species of skink found in Namibia, South Africa, and Botswana.
