= Trachylepis madagascariensis =

Conservation status
- Least Concern (IUCN 3.1)

Scientific classification
- Kingdom: Animalia
- Phylum: Chordata
- Class: Reptilia
- Order: Squamata
- Suborder: Scinciformata
- Infraorder: Scincomorpha
- Family: Mabuyidae
- Genus: Trachylepis
- Species: T. madagascariensis

Binomial name
- Trachylepis madagascariensis (Mocquard, 1908)
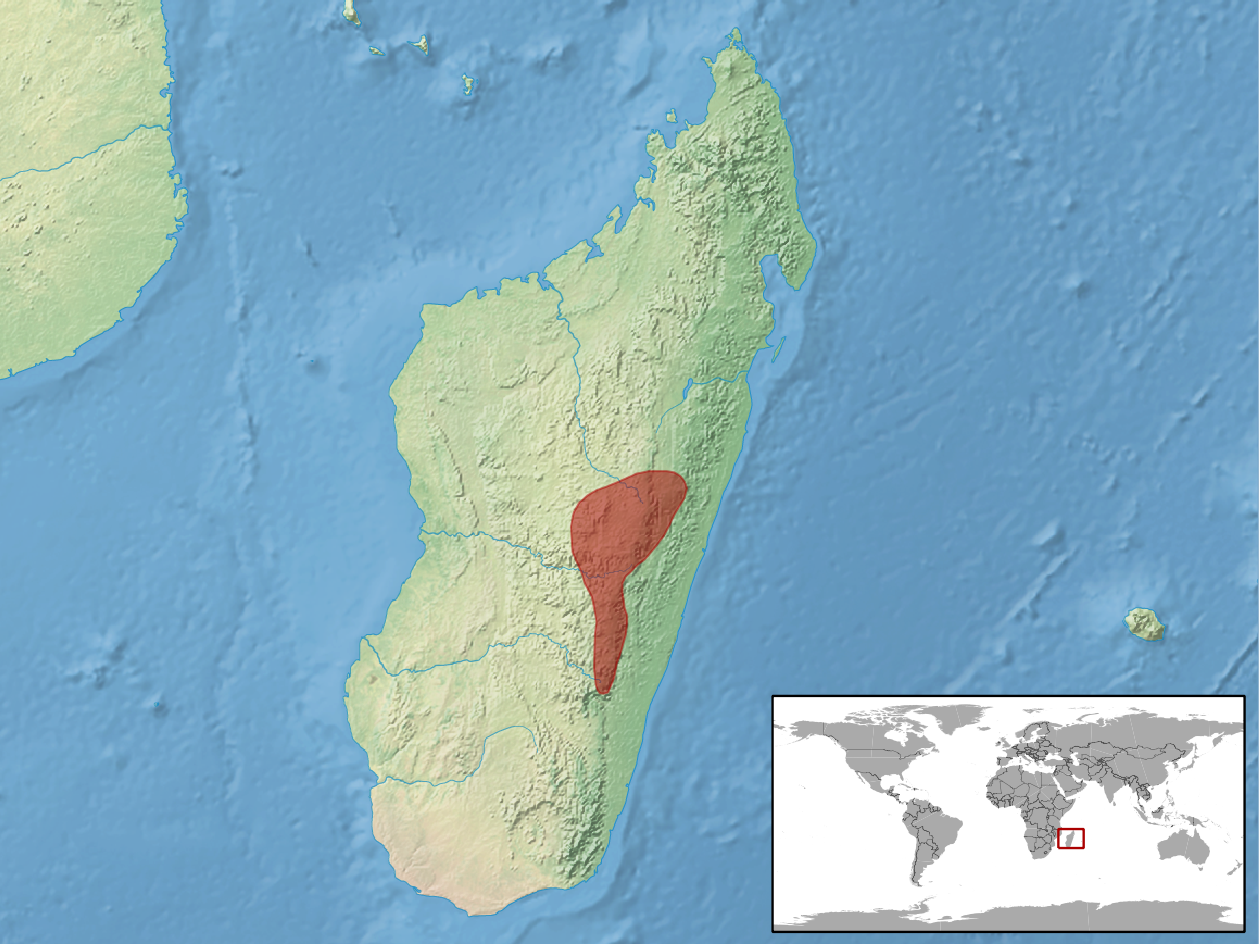

Species of lizard

The Malagasy mabuya (Trachylepis madagascariensis) is a species of skink found in Madagascar.
