= Trachylepis paucisquamis =

Scientific classification
- Domain: Eukaryota
- Kingdom: Animalia
- Phylum: Chordata
- Class: Reptilia
- Order: Squamata
- Family: Scincidae
- Genus: Trachylepis
- Species: T. paucisquamis

Binomial name
- Trachylepis paucisquamis (Hoogmoed, 1978)

Species of lizard

The tropical mabuya (Trachylepis paucisquamis) is a species of skink found in Ivory Coast, Ghana, and Liberia.
