= Trachylepis bocagii =

Conservation status
- Least Concern (IUCN 3.1)

Scientific classification
- Kingdom: Animalia
- Phylum: Chordata
- Class: Reptilia
- Order: Squamata
- Family: Scincidae
- Genus: Trachylepis
- Species: T. bocagii

Binomial name
- Trachylepis bocagii (Boulenger, 1887)
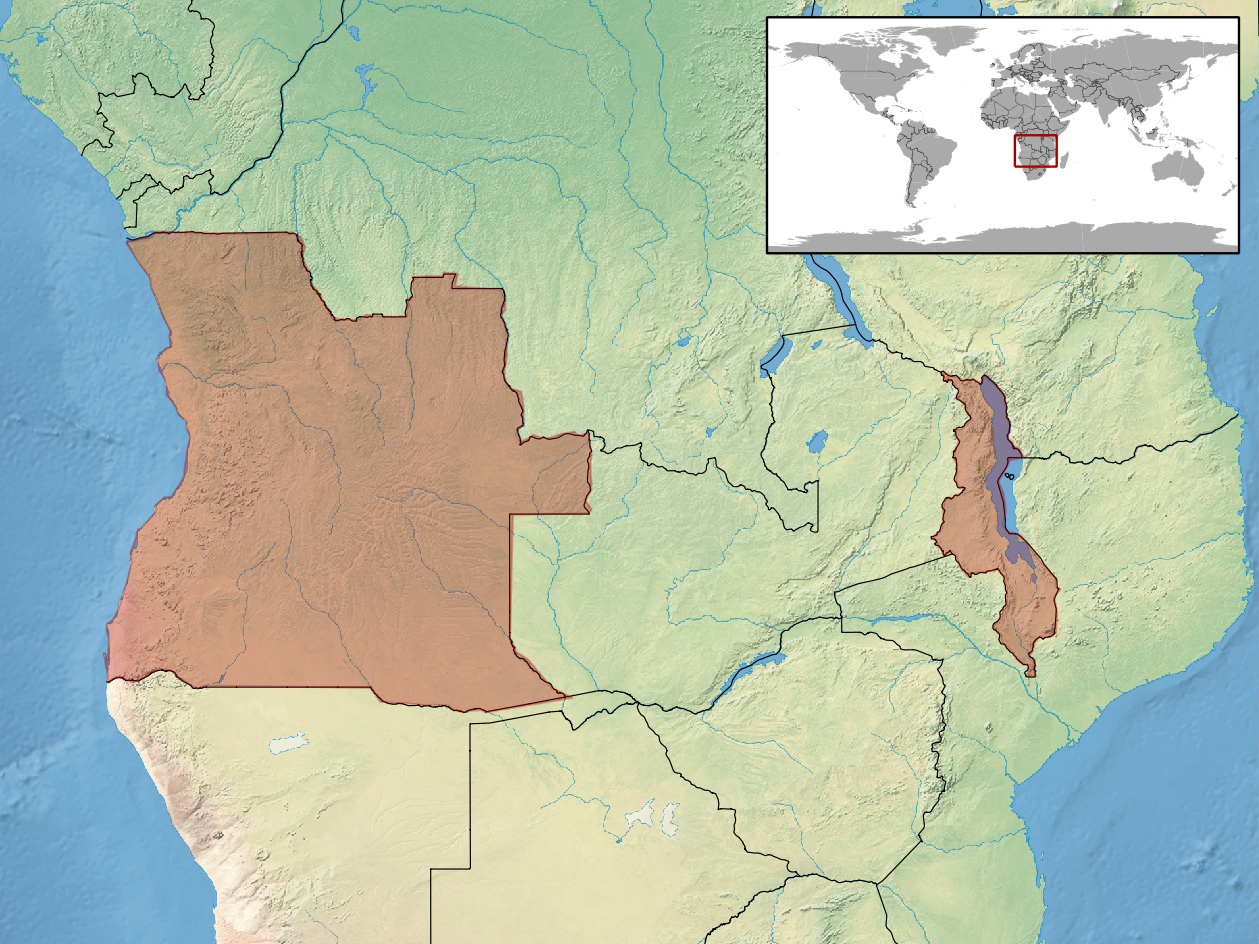

Synonyms
- Mabuia bocagii Boulenger, 1887; Mabuya bocagii — Hellmich, 1957; Euprepis bocagii — Mausfeld et al., 2002; Trachylepis bocagii — Bauer, 2003

Species of lizard

Trachylepis bocagii, also known commonly as Bocage's skink, is a species of lizard in the family Scincidae. The species is native to southern Africa.

== Etymology ==
The specific name, bocagii, is in honor of Portuguese zoologist José Vicente Barbosa du Bocage.

== Geographic range ==
T. bocagii is found in Angola, Malawi, Zambia, and Zimbabwe.

== Habitat ==
The preferred natural habitat of T. bocagii is savanna, at altitudes of 100–1,000 m (330–3,280 ft).

== Reproduction ==
T. bocagii is viviparous.
