= Trachylepis makalowodei =

Trachylepis makolowodei

Scientific classification
- Kingdom: Animalia
- Phylum: Chordata
- Class: Reptilia
- Order: Squamata
- Family: Scincidae
- Genus: Trachylepis
- Species: T. makolowodei

Binomial name
- Trachylepis makolowodei Chirio, Ineich, Schmitz & LeBreton, 2008

Species of lizard

Trachylepis makolowodei, also known commonly as Makolowode's skink and Makolowodes's trachylepis, is a species of lizard in the family Scincidae. The species is indigenous to Central Africa.

== Etymology ==
The specific name, makolowodei, is in honor of Central African herpetologist Paul Makolowode.

== Geographic range ==
T. makolowodei is found in Cameroon and Central African Republic.

== Reproduction ==
The mode of reproduction of T. makolowodei is unknown.
