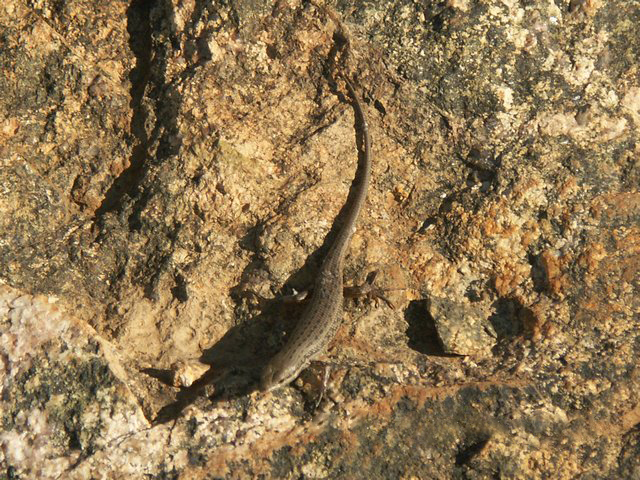

Scientific classification
- Domain: Eukaryota
- Kingdom: Animalia
- Phylum: Chordata
- Class: Reptilia
- Order: Squamata
- Family: Scincidae
- Genus: Trachylepis
- Species: T. variegata

Binomial name
- Trachylepis variegata (Peters, 1870)

= Trachylepis variegata =

Species of lizard

The variegated skink (Trachylepis variegata) is a species of skink found in Africa.
