= Trachylepis gonwouoi =

Scientific classification
- Kingdom: Animalia
- Phylum: Chordata
- Class: Reptilia
- Order: Squamata
- Family: Scincidae
- Genus: Trachylepis
- Species: T. gonwouoi

Binomial name
- Trachylepis gonwouoi K. Allen, Tapondjou, Welton & Bauer, 2017

Species of lizard

Trachylepis gonwouoi, also known commonly as Gonwouo's skink, is a species of lizard in the family Scincidae. The species is indigenous to the western coast of Central Africa.

== Etymology ==
The specific name, gonwouoi, is in honor of Cameroonian herpetologist LeGrand Gonwouo.

== Geographic range ==
T. gonwouoi is found in Cameroon and Republic of the Congo.

== Description ==
T. gonwouoi may attain a snout-to-vent length (SVL) of 8 cm (3.1 in).

== Reproduction ==
The mode of reproduction of T. gonwouoi is unknown.
