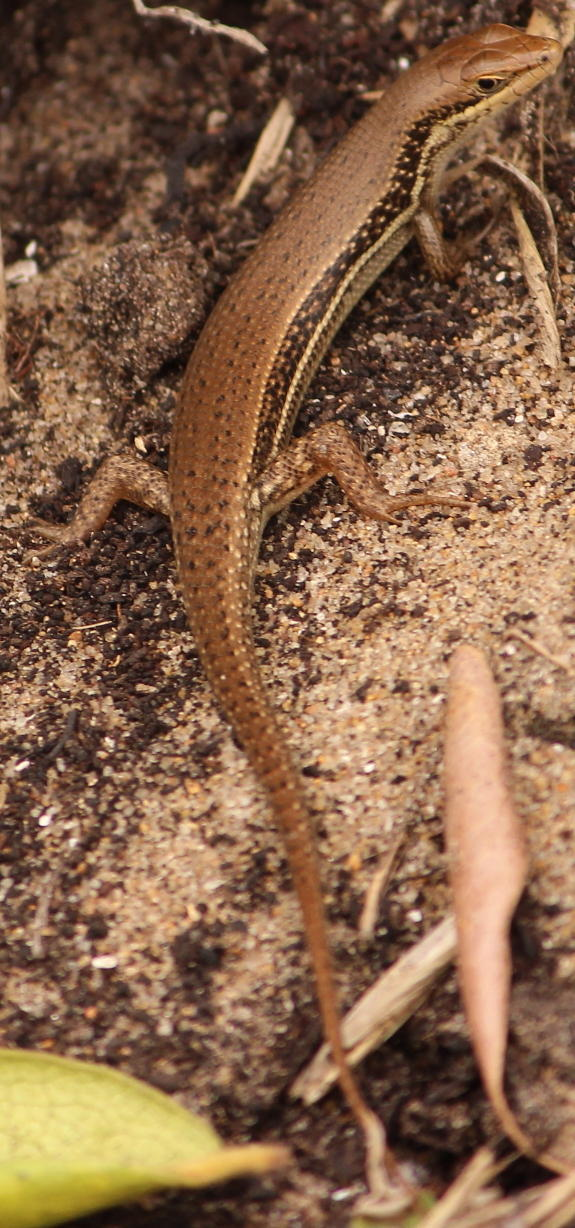

Conservation status
- Least Concern (IUCN 3.1)

Scientific classification
- Domain: Eukaryota
- Kingdom: Animalia
- Phylum: Chordata
- Class: Reptilia
- Order: Squamata
- Family: Scincidae
- Genus: Trachylepis
- Species: T. depressa

Binomial name
- Trachylepis depressa (Peters, 1854)

= Trachylepis depressa =

Species of lizard

The eastern sand skink (Trachylepis depressa) is a species of skink found in South Africa.
