= Trachylepis pulcherrima =

Scientific classification
- Kingdom: Animalia
- Phylum: Chordata
- Class: Reptilia
- Order: Squamata
- Family: Scincidae
- Genus: Trachylepis
- Species: T. pulcherrima

Binomial name
- Trachylepis pulcherrima (de Witte, 1953)

Species of lizard

The beautiful skink (Trachylepis pulcherrima) is a species of skink found in the Democratic Republic of the Congo.
