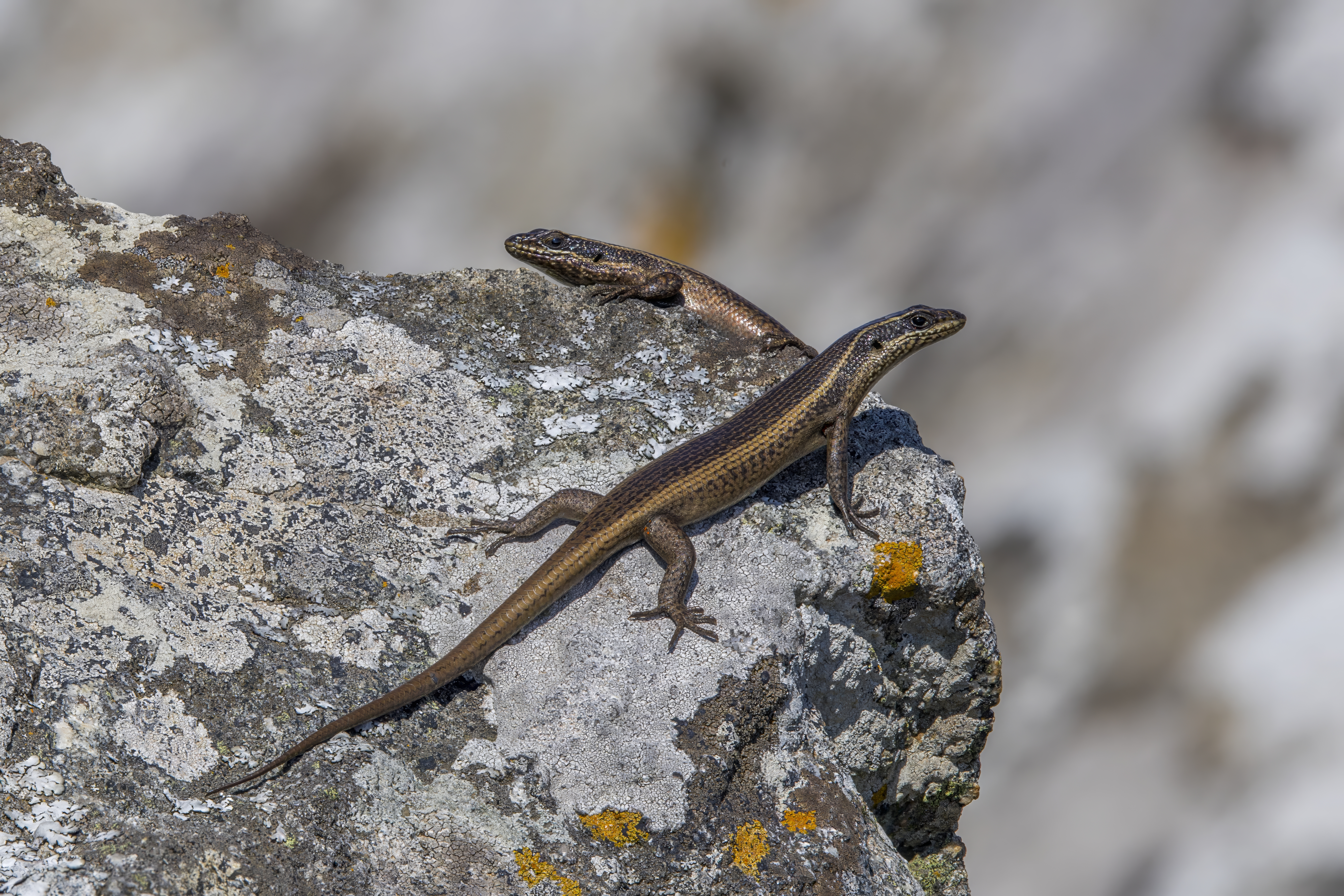
- Trachylepis striata
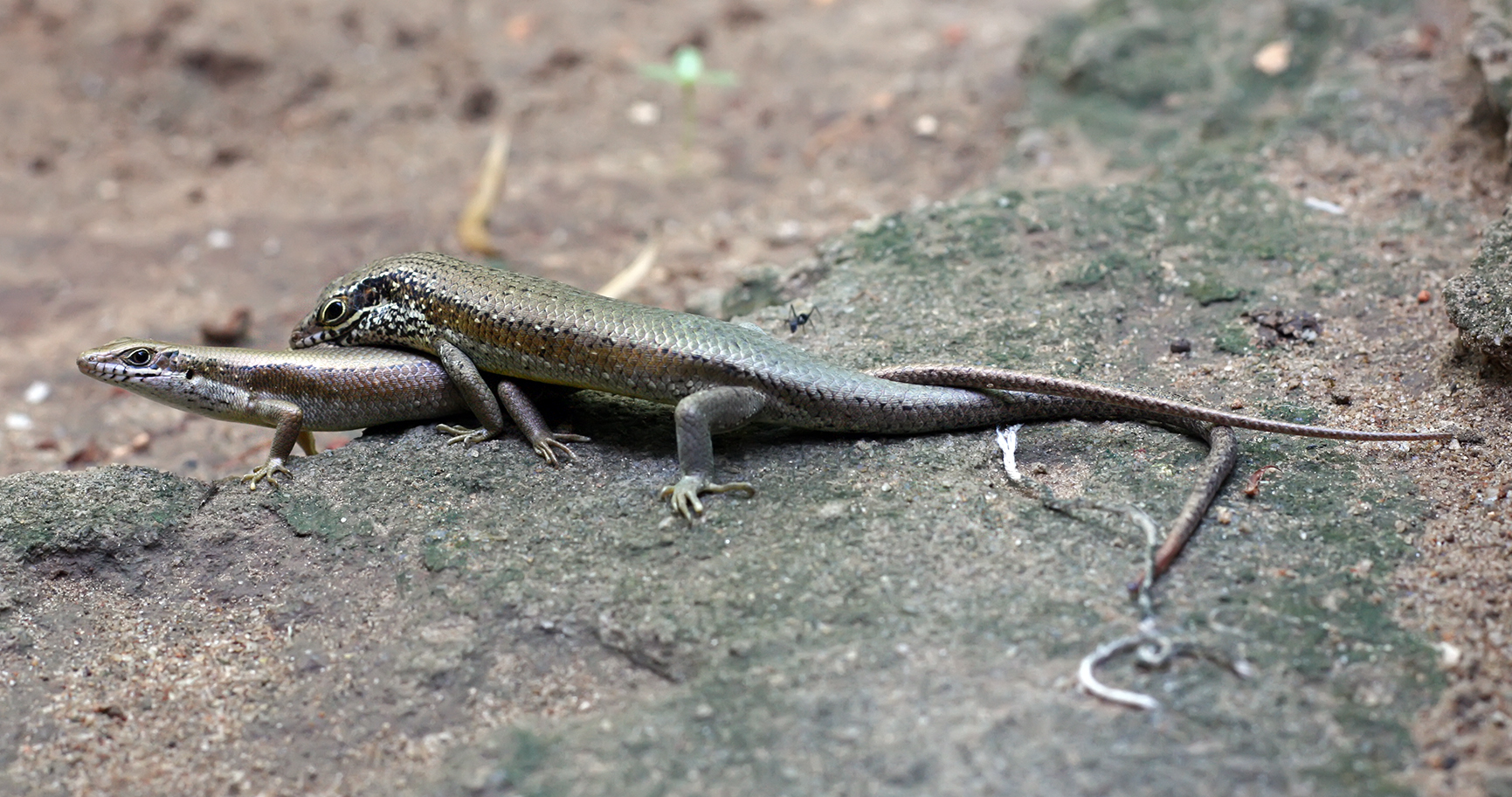
- Trachylepis maculilabris mating

Scientific classification
- Kingdom: Animalia
- Phylum: Chordata
- Class: Reptilia
- Order: Squamata
- Family: Scincidae
- Subfamily: Mabuyinae
- Genus: Trachylepis; Fitzinger, 1843

Species
- About 80, see text

= Trachylepis =

Genus of lizards

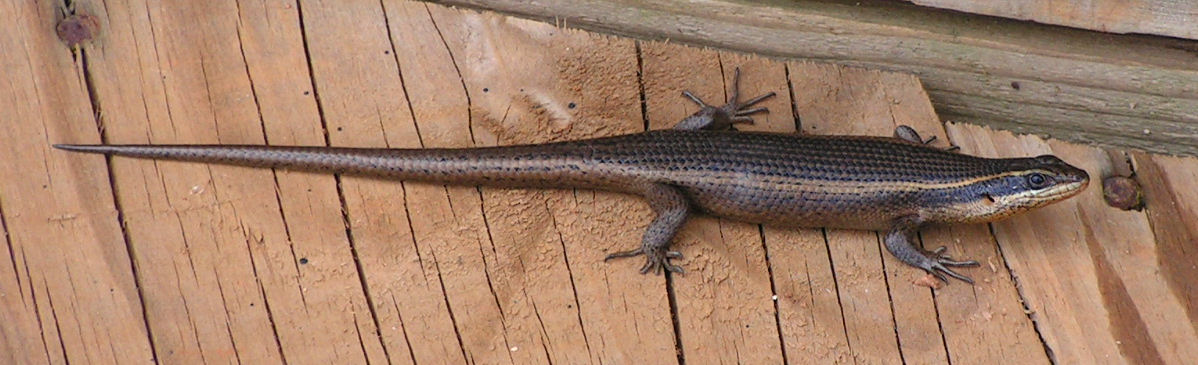
Trachylepis striata, African striped skink, Kruger Park

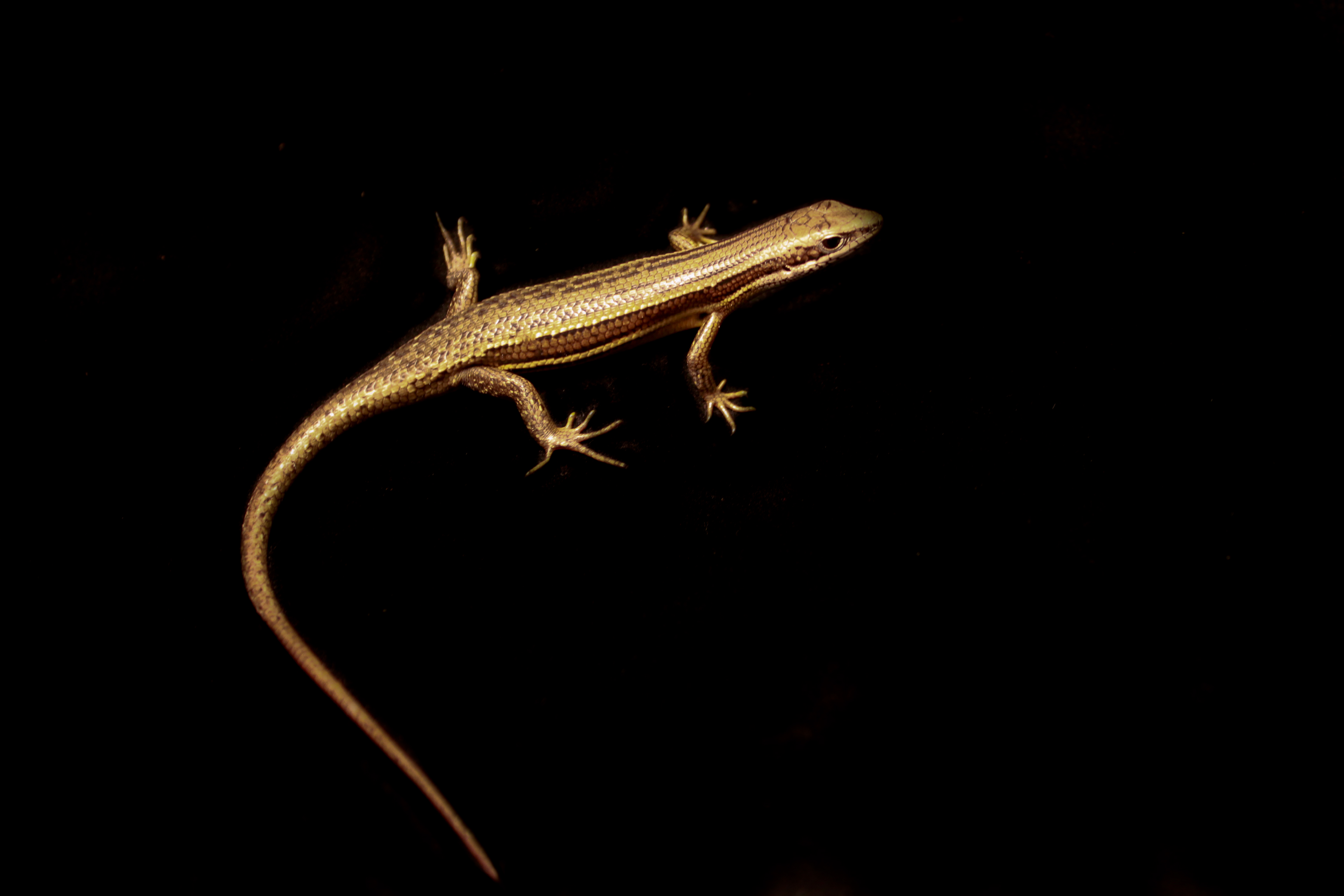
Trachylepis albilabris, Gabon

Trachylepis is a skink genus in the subfamily Mabuyinae found mainly in Africa. Its members were formerly included in the "wastebin taxon" Mabuya, and for some time in Euprepis. As defined today, Trachylepis contains the clade of Afro-Malagasy mabuyas. The genus also contains a species from the Brazilian island of Fernando de Noronha, T. atlantica, and may occur in mainland South America with Trachylepis tschudii and Trachylepis maculata, both poorly known and enigmatic. The ancestors of T. atlantica are believed to have rafted across the Atlantic from Africa during the last 9 million years.

The generic name Trachylepis literally means "rough-scaled", referring to the fact that most of the species, though superficially smooth-scaled, have three or more slight longitudinal keels on their dorsal scales.

== Species ==
The following species are recognized as being valid (listed alphabetically by specific name).

- Trachylepis acutilabris (W. Peters, 1862) – wedge-snouted skink, sharp-lipped mabuya
- Trachylepis adamastor Ceríaco, 2015 – Adamastor skink
- Trachylepis affinis (Gray, 1838) – Senegal mabuya
- Trachylepis albilabris (Hallowell, 1857) – Guinea mabuya
- Trachylepis albotaeniata (Boettger, 1913) – Pemba Island mabuya
- Trachylepis atlantica (Schmidt, 1945) – Noronha skink
- Trachylepis aureogularis (Muller, 1885) – Guinea mabuya, orange-throated skink
- Trachylepis aureopunctata (Grandidier, 1867) – gold-spotted mabuya
- Trachylepis bayonii (Bocage, 1872) – Bayão’s skink, Bayon's skink, Bayon's mabuya
- Trachylepis bensonii (W. Peters, 1867) – Benson's mabuya
- Trachylepis betsileana (Mocquard, 1906) – Betsileo mabuya
- Trachylepis binotata (Bocage, 1867) – Ovambo tree skink, Bocage's mabuya
- Trachylepis bocagii (Boulenger, 1887) – Bocage's skink
- Trachylepis boehmei Koppetsch, 2020 – Böhme's grass skink
- Trachylepis boettgeri (Boulenger, 1887) – Boettger's mabuya
- Trachylepis boulengeri (Sternfeld, 1911) – Boulenger's mabuya
- Trachylepis brauni (Tornier, 1902) – Braun's mabuya
- Trachylepis brevicollis (Wiegmann, 1837) – short-necked skink, Sudan mabuya
- Trachylepis buettneri (Matschie, 1893)
- Trachylepis capensis (Gray, 1831) – Cape skink, Cape three-lined skink
- Trachylepis casuarinae (Broadley, 1974) – Casuarina Island skink
- Trachylepis chimbana (Boulenger, 1887) – Chimba skink, Chimban mabuya
- Trachylepis comorensis (W. Peters, 1854) – Comoro Island skink
- Trachylepis cristinae Sindaco et al., 2012 – Abd Al Kuri skink
- Trachylepis damarana (W. Peters, 1870) – Damara skink
- Trachylepis depressa (W. Peters, 1854) – eastern sand skink
- Trachylepis dichroma R. Günther, Whiting & Bauer, 2005 – two-coloured skink
- Trachylepis dumasi (Nussbaum & Raxworthy, 1995)
- Trachylepis elegans W. Peters, 1854 – elegant mabuya
- Trachylepis ferrarai (Lanza, 1978) – Ferrara's mabuya
- Trachylepis gonwouoi Allen et al., 2017 – Gonwouo’s skink
- Trachylepis gravenhorstii (A.M.C. Duméril & Bibron, 1839) – Gravenhorst's mabuya
- Trachylepis hemmingi (Gans, Laurent & Pandit, 1965) – Somali mabuya
- Trachylepis hildebrandtii (W. Peters, 1874) – Hildebrandt’s skink
- Trachylepis hoeschi (Mertens, 1954) – Hoesch's mabuya
- Trachylepis homalocephala (Wiegmann, 1828) – red-sided skink
- Trachylepis infralineata (Boettger, 1913)
- Trachylepis irregularis (Lönnberg, 1922) – alpine meadow mabuya
- Trachylepis keroanensis (Chabanaud, 1921) – Teita mabuya
- Trachylepis lacertiformis (W. Peters, 1854) – bronze rock skink
- Trachylepis laevigata (Peters, 1869) – variable skink, striped-neck variable skink
- Trachylepis laevis (Boulenger, 1907) – Angolan blue-tailed skink
- Trachylepis langheldi (Sternfeld, 1917) – Langheld's skink
- Trachylepis lavarambo (Nussbaum & Raxworthy, 1998)
- Trachylepis loluiensis Kingdon & Spawls, 2010 – Loloui Island skink
- Trachylepis maculata (Gray, 1839) – spotted mabuya
- Trachylepis maculilabris (Gray, 1845) – speckle-lipped skink, speckle-lipped mabuya
- Trachylepis madagascariensis (Mocquard, 1908) – Malagasy mabuya
- Trachylepis makolowodei Chirio et al., 2008 – Makolowodé's trachylepis
- Trachylepis margaritifera (W. Peters, 1854) – rainbow skink
- Trachylepis megalura (W. Peters, 1878) – grass-top skink, long-tailed skink
- Trachylepis mekuana (Chirio & Ineich, 2000)
- Trachylepis mlanjensis (Loveridge, 1953) – Mulanje skink
- Trachylepis monardi (Monard, 1937) – Monard’s skink
- Trachylepis nancycoutuae (Nussbaum & Raxworthy, 1998)
- Trachylepis nganghae Ineich & Chirio, 2004
- Trachylepis occidentalis (W. Peters, 1867) – western three-striped skink
- Trachylepis ozorii (Bocage, 1893)
- Trachylepis paucisquamis (Hoogmoed, 1978) – tropical mabuya
- Trachylepis pendeana (Ineich & Chirio, 2000)
- Trachylepis perrotetii (A.M.C. Duméril & Bibron, 1839) – Teita mabuya, African red-sided skink
- Trachylepis planifrons (W. Peters, 1878) – tree skink
- Trachylepis polytropis (Boulenger, 1903) – tropical mabuya
- Trachylepis pulcherrima (de Witte, 1953) – beautiful skink
- Trachylepis punctatissima (A. Smith, 1849) – montane speckled skink, speckled rock skink
- Trachylepis punctulata (Bocage, 1872) – speckled sand skink, speckled skink
- Trachylepis quinquetaeniata (Lichtenstein, 1823) – African five-lined skink, rainbow mabuya
- Trachylepis raymondlaurenti Marques, Ceríaco, Bandeira, Pauwels & Bauer, 2019 – Laurent's long-tailed skink
- Trachylepis rodenburgi (Hoogmoed, 1974) – Rodenburg's mabuya
- Trachylepis sechellensis (A.M.C. Duméril & Bibron, 1839) – Seychelles mabuya
- Trachylepis socotrana (W. Peters, 1882) – Socotra skink
- Trachylepis sparsa (Mertens, 1954) – Karasburg tree skink
- Trachylepis spilogaster (W. Peters, 1882) – Kalahari tree skink, spiny mabuya
- Trachylepis striata (W. Peters, 1844) – African striped mabuya, striped skink
- Trachylepis sulcata (W. Peters, 1867) – western rock skink
- Trachylepis tandrefana (Nussbaum, Raxworthy & Ramanamanjato, 1999)
- Trachylepis tavaratra (Ramanamanjato, Nussbaum & Raxworthy, 1999)
- Trachylepis tessellata (Anderson, 1895) – tessellated mabuya
- Trachylepis thomensis Ceríaco, Marques & Bauer, 2016
- Trachylepis varia (W. Peters, 1867) – variable skink
- Trachylepis variegata (W. Peters, 1870) – variegated skink
- Trachylepis vato (Nussbaum & Raxworthy, 1994) – boulder mabuya
- Trachylepis vezo (Ramanamanjato, Nussbaum & Raxworthy, 1999)
- Trachylepis volamenaloha (Nussbaum, Raxworthy & Ramanamanjato, 1999)
- Trachylepis wahlbergii (Peters, 1870) – Wahlberg's striped skink
- Trachylepis wingati (F. Werner, 1908) – Wingate’s skink
- Trachylepis wrightii (Boulenger, 1887) –Wright's skink, Wright's mabuya

Nota bene: A binomial authority in parentheses indicates that the species was originally described in a genus other than Trachylepis.
