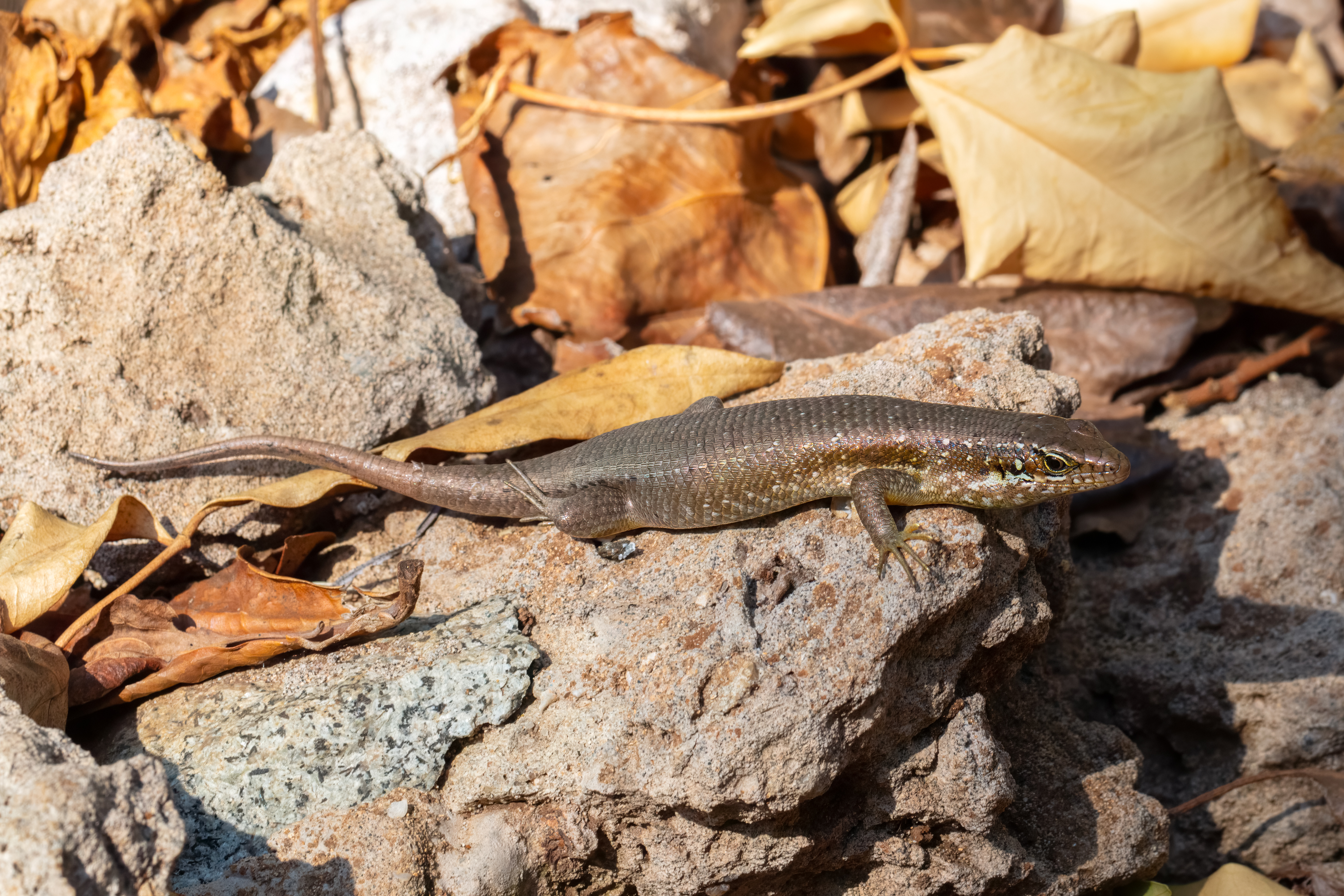

Conservation status
- Least Concern (IUCN 3.1)

Scientific classification
- Kingdom: Animalia
- Phylum: Chordata
- Class: Reptilia
- Order: Squamata
- Family: Scincidae
- Genus: Trachylepis
- Species: T. comorensis

Binomial name
- Trachylepis comorensis (Peters, 1854)

= Trachylepis comorensis =

Species of lizard

Trachylepis comorensis (Comoro Island skink) is a species of skink. It is found in the Comoro Islands, Madagascar and Mozambique.
