= Trachylepis albotaeniata =

Scientific classification
- Domain: Eukaryota
- Kingdom: Animalia
- Phylum: Chordata
- Class: Reptilia
- Order: Squamata
- Family: Scincidae
- Genus: Trachylepis
- Species: T. albotaeniata

Binomial name
- Trachylepis albotaeniata (Boettger, 1913)

Species of lizard

Trachylepis albotaeniata, the Pemba Island mabuya, is a species of skink found on Pemba Island in Tanzania.
