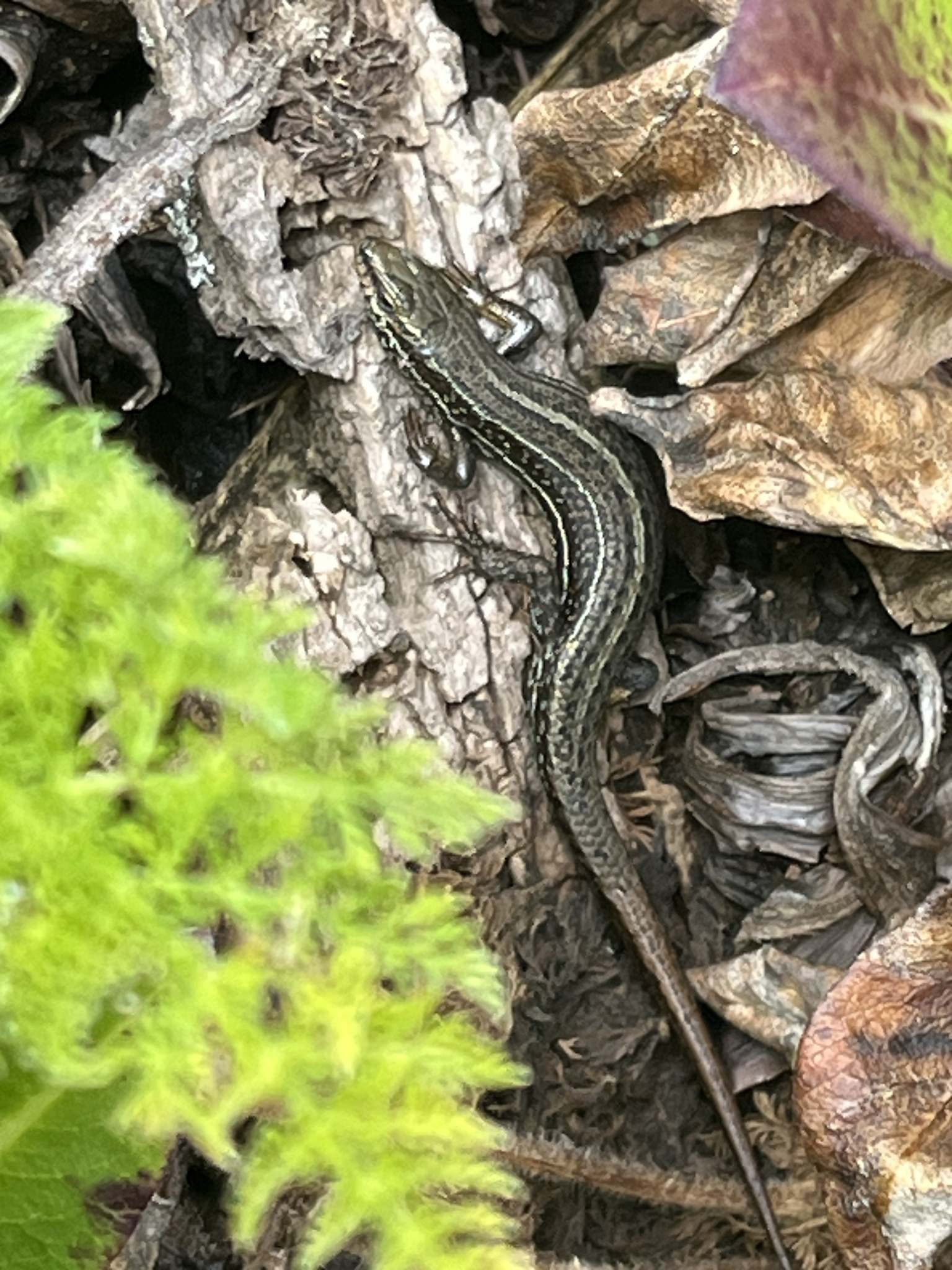

Conservation status
- Near Threatened (IUCN 3.1)

Scientific classification
- Kingdom: Animalia
- Phylum: Chordata
- Class: Reptilia
- Order: Squamata
- Family: Scincidae
- Genus: Trachylepis
- Species: T. irregularis

Binomial name
- Trachylepis irregularis (Lönnberg, 1922)

= Trachylepis irregularis =

Species of lizard

The alpine meadow mabuya (Trachylepis irregularis) is a species of skink found in Uganda and Kenya.
