= Trachylepis loluiensis =

Conservation status
- Vulnerable (IUCN 3.1)

Scientific classification
- Kingdom: Animalia
- Phylum: Chordata
- Class: Reptilia
- Order: Squamata
- Suborder: Scinciformata
- Infraorder: Scincomorpha
- Family: Mabuyidae
- Genus: Trachylepis
- Species: T. loluiensis

Binomial name
- Trachylepis loluiensis Kingdon & Spawls, 2010

Species of lizard

Trachylepis loluiensis, also known as the Lolui Island skink, is a species of skink. It is endemic to Lolui Island in Lake Victoria, Uganda. The species was first scientifically described by Kingdon & Spawls in 2010.
