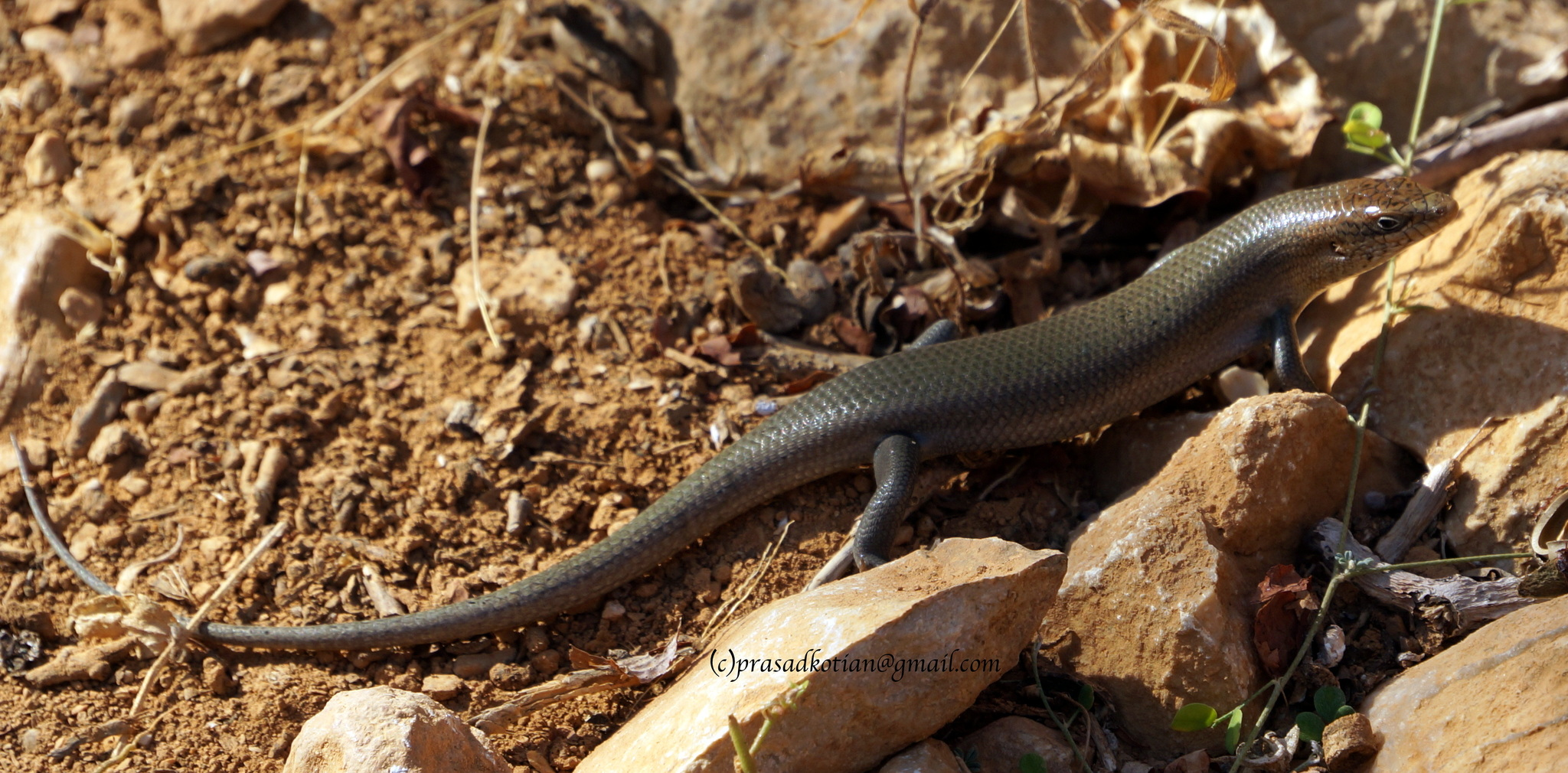

Conservation status
- Least Concern (IUCN 3.1)

Scientific classification
- Kingdom: Animalia
- Phylum: Chordata
- Class: Reptilia
- Order: Squamata
- Suborder: Scinciformata
- Infraorder: Scincomorpha
- Family: Mabuyidae
- Genus: Trachylepis
- Species: T. socotrana

Binomial name
- Trachylepis socotrana (Peters, 1882)
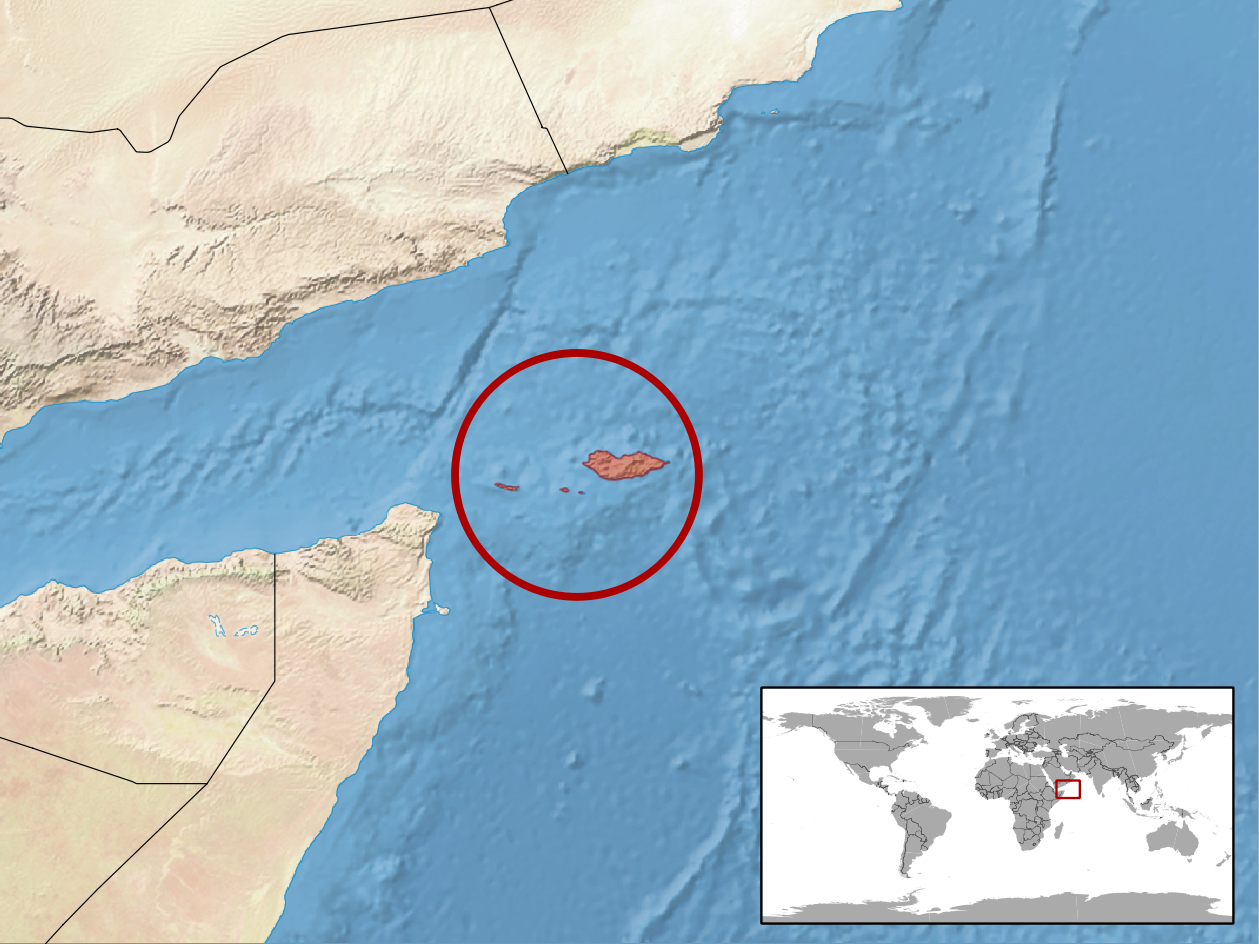

= Trachylepis socotrana =

Species of lizard

The Socotra skink (Trachylepis socotrana) is a species of skink found in Socotra.
