= Trachylepis monardi =

Scientific classification
- Domain: Eukaryota
- Kingdom: Animalia
- Phylum: Chordata
- Class: Reptilia
- Order: Squamata
- Family: Scincidae
- Genus: Trachylepis
- Species: T. monardi

Binomial name
- Trachylepis monardi (Monard, 1937)

Synonyms
- Mabuya striata angolensis Monard 1937; Mabuya angolensis – Welch 1982: 83; Euprepis angolensis – Mausfeld et al. 2002; Trachylepis angolensis – Bauer 2003; Trachylepis monardi – Marques et al. 2018: 265 (nom. nov.)

Species of lizard

Monard's skink (Trachylepis monardi) is a species of skink. It is endemic to Angola. It is named after Albert Monard, the original species descriptor; the current name is a replacement name to solve secondary homonymy with Euprepis angolensis Bocage, 1872 [=Trachylepis varia (Peters, 1867)].
