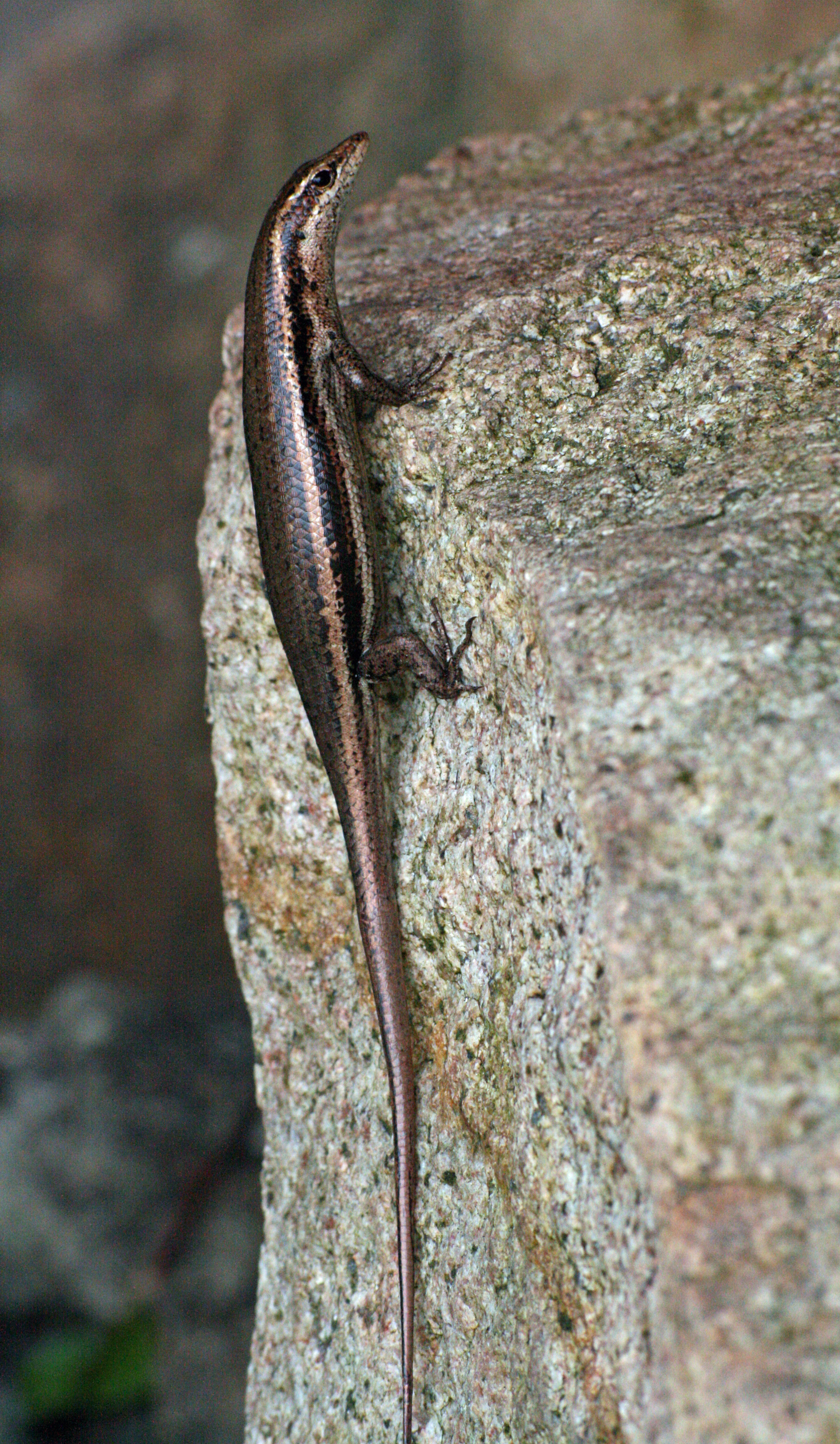

Conservation status
- Least Concern (IUCN 3.1)

Scientific classification
- Domain: Eukaryota
- Kingdom: Animalia
- Phylum: Chordata
- Class: Reptilia
- Order: Squamata
- Family: Scincidae
- Genus: Trachylepis
- Species: T. seychellensis

Binomial name
- Trachylepis seychellensis (Duméril & Bibron, 1839)
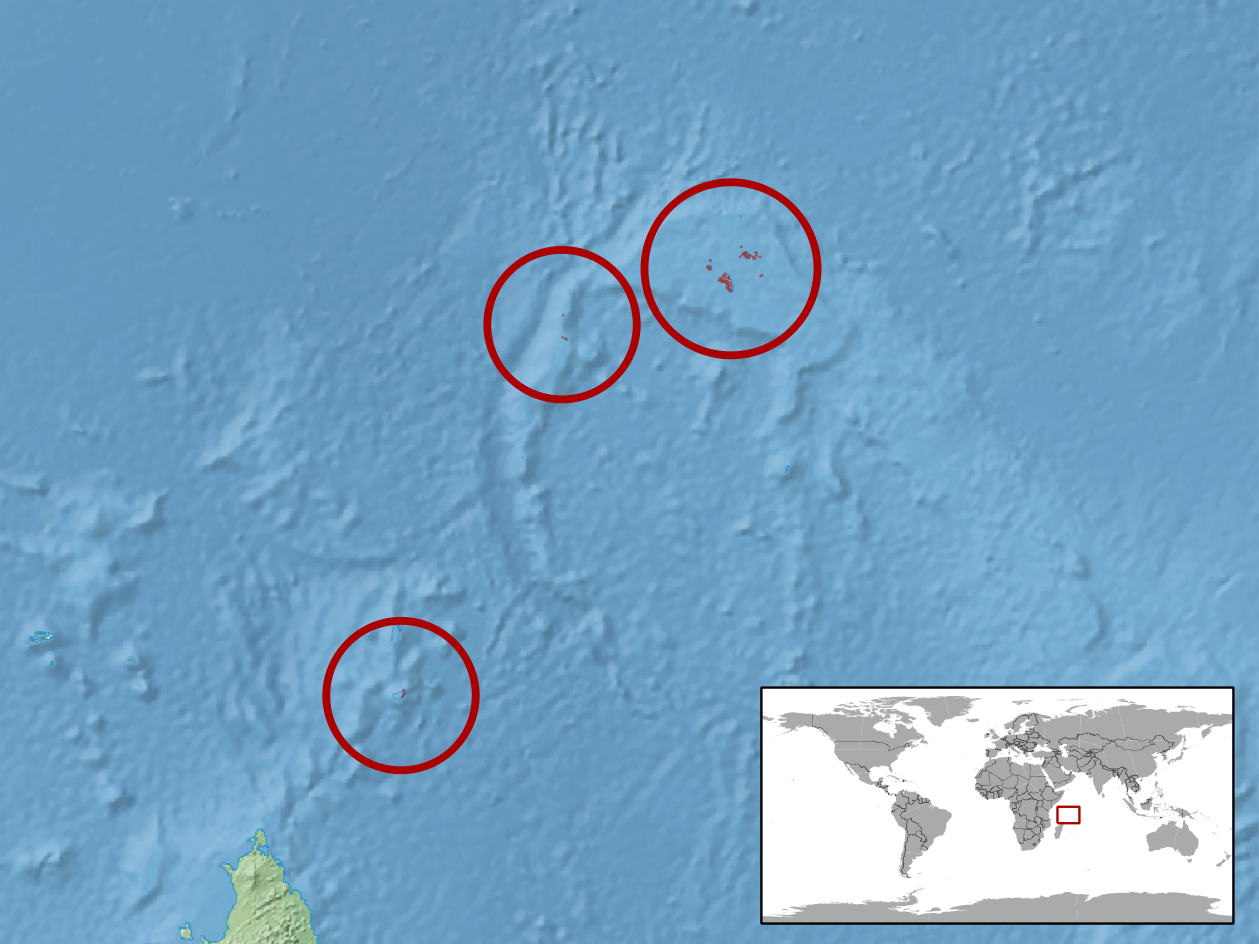

Synonyms
- Euprepes Sechellensis Duméril & Bibron, 1839; Mabuya seychellensis (Duméril & Bibron, 1839)

= Seychelles skink =

Species of lizard

The Seychelles skink (Trachylepis seychellensis) also known as the Mangouya, is a species of skink in the family Scincidae. It is endemic to the Seychelles.

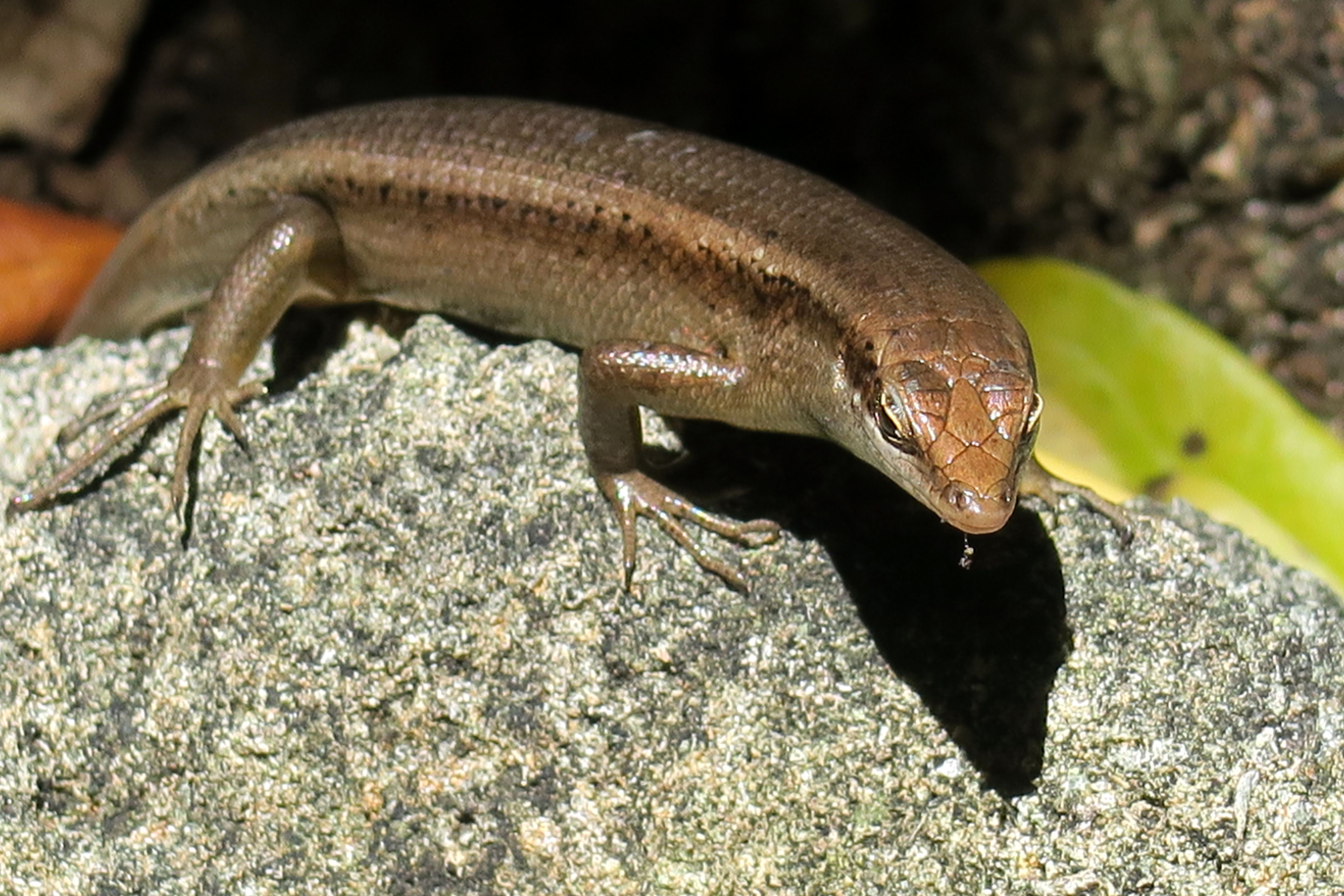
A Seychelles skink in Cousin Island, Seychelles.

== Distribution and habitat ==
The Seychelles skink is endemic to the Seychelles where it is found on islands of Mahé (and nearby islets), Silhouette, Praslin, North, Aride, Cousin, Cousine, Curieuse, La Digue, Grande Soeur, Petite Soeur, Félicité, Frégate and some other islands. It has been introduced into the Amirantes Islands in the southern Seychelles. It occurs from sea level to elevations of up to 550 m (1,800 ft). It is common in woodland, shrubby areas, plantations, parks, gardens, mangroves and urban locations.

== Ecology ==
Skinks are similar in appearance to other lizards but lack necks and have long tails that are easily shed. The Seychelles skink feeds on such insects as flies, crickets, grasshoppers, beetles and caterpillars. This species reproduces by producing clutches of eggs.

== Status ==
The Seychelles skink is a very adaptable species, able to utilise the many habitats available on the Seychelles. Although its total area of occupancy is less than 5,000 square kilometres (1,900 sq mi), it is a common species with no particular threats being recognised, and the International Union for Conservation of Nature has assessed its conservation status as being of "least concern". It is present in several national parks and protected areas.
