= Trachylepis langheldi =

Scientific classification
- Domain: Eukaryota
- Kingdom: Animalia
- Phylum: Chordata
- Class: Reptilia
- Order: Squamata
- Family: Scincidae
- Genus: Trachylepis
- Species: T. langheldi

Binomial name
- Trachylepis langheldi (Sternfeld, 1917)

Species of lizard

Langheld's skink (Trachylepis langheldi) is a species of skink found in Cameroon, Mali, and Ivory Coast.
