= Trachylepis laevigata =

Conservation status
- Least Concern (IUCN 3.1)

Scientific classification
- Kingdom: Animalia
- Phylum: Chordata
- Class: Reptilia
- Order: Squamata
- Suborder: Scinciformata
- Infraorder: Scincomorpha
- Family: Mabuyidae
- Genus: Trachylepis
- Species: T. laevigata

Binomial name
- Trachylepis laevigata (Peters, 1869)

Species of lizard

The variable skink or striped-neck variable skink (Trachylepis laevigata) is a species of skink found in South Africa.
