= Trachylepis aureogularis =

Conservation status
- Least Concern (IUCN 3.1)

Scientific classification
- Kingdom: Animalia
- Phylum: Chordata
- Class: Reptilia
- Order: Squamata
- Suborder: Scinciformata
- Infraorder: Scincomorpha
- Family: Mabuyidae
- Genus: Trachylepis
- Species: T. aureogularis

Binomial name
- Trachylepis aureogularis (Müller, 1885)

Species of lizard

Trachylepis aureogularis, the Guinea mabuya or orange-throated skink, is a species of skink found in Guinea, Liberia, Ivory Coast, and Ghana.
