= List of lizards of South Africa =

This is a list of lizards found in South Africa.

- Agama armata
- Bibron's thick-toed gecko
- Broadley's flat lizard
- Cape dwarf gecko
- Cape flat lizard
- Cape grass lizard
- Common flat lizard
- Dwarf flat lizard
- Hemicordylus
- Lebombo flat lizard
- Nile monitor
- Nucras caesicaudata
- Pachydactylus atorquatus
- Pachydactylus austeni
- Pachydactylus geitje
- Pachydactylus labialis
- Pachydactylus rangei
- Scelotes limpopoensis
- Trachylepis capensis
- Trachylepis punctatissima
- Trachylepis spilogaster
- Trachylepis striata
- Transvaal girdled lizard
- Transvaal grass lizard
- Typhlacontias brevipes
- Warren's girdled lizard
- Zoutpansberg girdled lizard
