= Pachydactylus scherzi =

Conservation status
- Least Concern (IUCN 3.1)

Scientific classification
- Kingdom: Animalia
- Phylum: Chordata
- Class: Reptilia
- Order: Squamata
- Suborder: Gekkota
- Family: Gekkonidae
- Genus: Pachydactylus
- Species: P. scherzi

Binomial name
- Pachydactylus scherzi Mertens, 1954

Synonyms
- Pachydactylus punctatus scherzi Mertens, 1954; Pachydactylus scherzi — Bauer & Branch, 1995

Species of lizard

Pachydactylus scherzi is a lizard species in the Gekkonidae family. The species is native to Southern Africa.

== Etymology ==
The specific name, scherzi, is in honor of German chemical engineer Ernst Rudolph Scherz (1906–1981).

== Geographic range ==
P. scherzi is found in Angola and Namibia.

== Habitat ==
The preferred natural habitat of P. scherzi is rocky outcrops in the desert or the savanna.

== Description ==
Adults of P. scherzi have a snout-to-vent length (SVL) of 2.5–3.5 centimetres (0.98–1.38 in). Dorsally, P. scherzi is brown, with whitish crossbands that are edged with dark brown and often broken in the middle. Ventrally, it is cream-colored.

== Reproduction ==
P. scherzi is oviparous.
