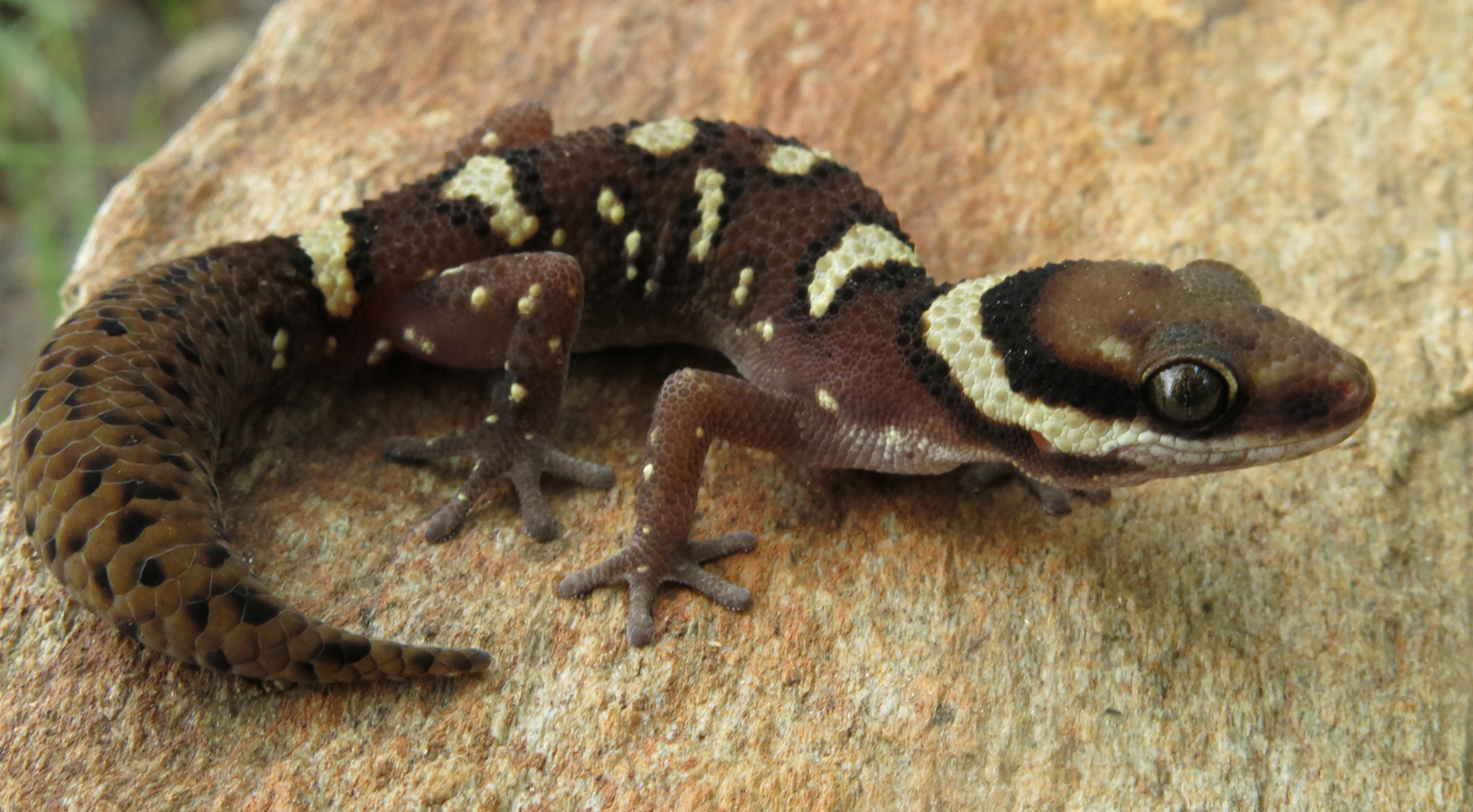
- P. oshaughnessyi at Lusaka, Zambia

Scientific classification
- Kingdom: Animalia
- Phylum: Chordata
- Class: Reptilia
- Order: Squamata
- Suborder: Gekkota
- Family: Gekkonidae
- Subfamily: Uroplatinae
- Genus: Pachydactylus; Wiegmann, 1834

Synonyms
- Colopus W. Peters, 1869; Palmatogecko Andersson, 1908

= Pachydactylus =

Thick-toed geckos

Genus of lizards

Pachydactylus is a genus of insectivorous geckos, lizards in the family Gekkonidae. The genus is endemic to Africa, and member species are commonly known as thick-toed geckos. The genus also displays rich speciation, having 58 distinct species identified when compared to other closely related gecko genera like Rhoptropus, most of which have emerged since 35 Ma. It has been suggested that the reason for this rich speciation is not from adaptive radiation nor nonadaptive radiation, but that the genus represents a clade somewhere between the two drivers of speciation. P. bibronii geckos have been used by NASA as animal models for experimentation.

== Description of the Pachydactylus genus ==
The genus Pachydactylus is characterized by dilated toe tips, usually with adhesive, undivided scansors, as well as hyperphalangy on the first digit of the manus and pes. Body scales are small, granular and non-overlapping, with or without large keeled or unkeeled tubercles.

Coloration of Pachydactylus species varies, but is generally drab in color.

Presence of adhesive toe pads varies by species and habitat, with rock-dwelling species of Pachydactylus retaining adhesive pads, but unambiguous independent loss of toe pads in sand-dwelling and burrowing species like P. rangei.

Body size in Pachydactylus varies across the 58 species, ranging in snout-to-vent length (SVL) from 35 mm (1.4 in) to 115 mm (4.5 in), with the ancestral condition of a larger body size with adhesive toe pads to suit a generalist habitat.

== Behavior ==
All observed species of Pachydactylus are strictly nocturnal.

== Habitat of Pachydactylus geckos ==
Pachydactylus species live in a diverse range of habitats across Southern Africa. Habitat varies by species, with some species preferring generalist habitats, human dwellings, rock-dwellings, and sand dwellings. Habitat preference typically varies by body size and retention of toe pads, which varies across the genus. The body size of Pachydactylus geckos has been shown to correlate with their habitat range.

== Diet ==
Lizards of the genus Pachydactylus feed mainly on arthropods, but have been observed eating small vertebrates.

== Geographic range ==
The geographic range of the genus Pachydactylus is centered on Southern Africa, with some species reaching East Africa, the northernmost limit of their distribution. In South Africa's rugged Richtersveld region, Pachydactylus geckos comprised 13 of the 18 gecko species surveyed.

== Species ==
There are 58 species that are recognized as being valid:

- Pachydactylus acuminatus V. FitzSimons, 1941
- Pachydactylus affinis Boulenger, 1896 – Transvaal thick-toed gecko
- Pachydactylus amoenus F. Werner, 1910
- Pachydactylus angolensis Loveridge, 1944 – Angola large-scaled gecko, Angolan thick-toed gecko
- Pachydactylus atorquatus Bauer, Barts & Hulbert, 2006
- Pachydactylus austeni Hewitt, 1923 – Austen's thick-toed gecko
- Pachydactylus barnardi V. FitzSimons, 1941 – Barnard's thick-toed gecko
- Pachydactylus bicolor Hewitt, 1926 – velvety thick-toed gecko
- Pachydactylus boehmei Bauer, 2010
- Pachydactylus capensis (A. Smith, 1846) – Cape thick-toed gecko
- Pachydactylus caraculicus V. FitzSimons, 1959 – Angola banded thick-toed gecko
- Pachydactylus carinatus Bauer, Lamb & Branch, 2006
- Pachydactylus etultra Branch, Bauer, Jackman & Heinicke, 2011
- Pachydactylus fasciatus Boulenger, 1888 – banded thick-toed gecko
- Pachydactylus formosus A. Smith, 1849 – Smith's thick-toed gecko
- Pachydactylus gaiasensis Steyn & A.J.L. Mitchell, 1967 – Brandberg thick-toed gecko
- Pachydactylus geitje (Sparrman, 1778) – ocellated thick-toed gecko
- Pachydactylus griffini Bauer, Lamb & Branch, 2006
- Pachydactylus haackei Branch, Bauer & Good, 1996 – Haacke's thick-toed gecko
- Pachydactylus katanganus de Witte, 1953
- Pachydactylus kladaroderma Branch, Bauer & Good, 1996 – thin-skinned thick-toed gecko
- Pachydactylus kobosensis V. FitzSimons, 1938
- Pachydactylus kochii (V. FitzSimons, 1959)
- Pachydactylus labialis V. FitzSimons, 1938 – Calvinia thick-toed gecko
- Pachydactylus latirostris Hewitt, 1923 – quartz gecko
- Pachydactylus macrolepis V. FitzSimons, 1939 – large-scaled banded gecko
- Pachydactylus maculatus Gray, 1845 – spotted thick-toed gecko
- Pachydactylus maiatoi Marques, Parrinha, Ceríaco, Brennan, Heinicke & Bauer, 2023 – Maiato's thick-toed gecko
- Pachydactylus maraisi Heinicke, Adderly, Bauer & Jackman, 2011
- Pachydactylus mariquensis A. Smith, 1849 – Marico thick-toed gecko
- Pachydactylus mclachlani Bauer, Lamb & Branch, 2006
- Pachydactylus monicae Bauer, Lamb & Branch, 2006
- Pachydactylus montanus Methuen & Hewitt, 1914
- Pachydactylus namaquensis (Sclater, 1898) – Namaqua thick-toed gecko
- Pachydactylus oculatus Hewitt, 1927 – golden spotted thick-toed gecko
- Pachydactylus oreophilus McLachlan & Spence, 1967 – Kaokoveld thick-toed gecko
- Pachydactylus oshaughnessyi Boulenger, 1885
- Pachydactylus otaviensis Bauer, Lamb & Branch, 2006
- Pachydactylus parascutatus Bauer, Lamb & Branch, 2002
- Pachydactylus punctatus W. Peters, 1854 – speckled thick-toed gecko
- Pachydactylus purcelli Boulenger, 1910
- Pachydactylus rangei (Andersson, 1908) – Namib sand gecko
- Pachydactylus reconditus Bauer, Lamb & Branch, 2006
- Pachydactylus robertsi V. FitzSimons, 1938
- Pachydactylus rugosus A. Smith, 1849 – rough thick-toed gecko
- Pachydactylus sansteynae Steyn & Mitchell, 1967 – San Steyn's thick-toed gecko
- Pachydactylus scherzi Mertens, 1954 – Sherz's thick-toed gecko
- Pachydactylus scutatus Hewitt, 1927 – large-scaled thick-toed gecko
- Pachydactylus serval F. Werner, 1910 – western spotted thick-toed gecko
- Pachydactylus tigrinus Van Dam, 1921 – tiger thick-toed gecko
- Pachydactylus tsodiloensis Haacke, 1966 – Tsodilo thick-toed gecko
- Pachydactylus vansoni V. FitzSimons, 1933 – Van Son's thick-toed gecko
- Pachydactylus vanzyli (Steyn & Haacke, 1966)
- Pachydactylus visseri Bauer, Lamb & Branch, 2006
- Pachydactylus wahlbergii W. Peters, 1869
- Pachydactylus waterbergensis Bauer, Lamb & Branch, 2003
- Pachydactylus weberi Roux, 1907 – Weber's thick-toed gecko
- Pachydactylus werneri Hewitt, 1935

Nota bene: A binomial authority in parentheses indicates that the species was originally described in a genus other than Pachydactylus.
