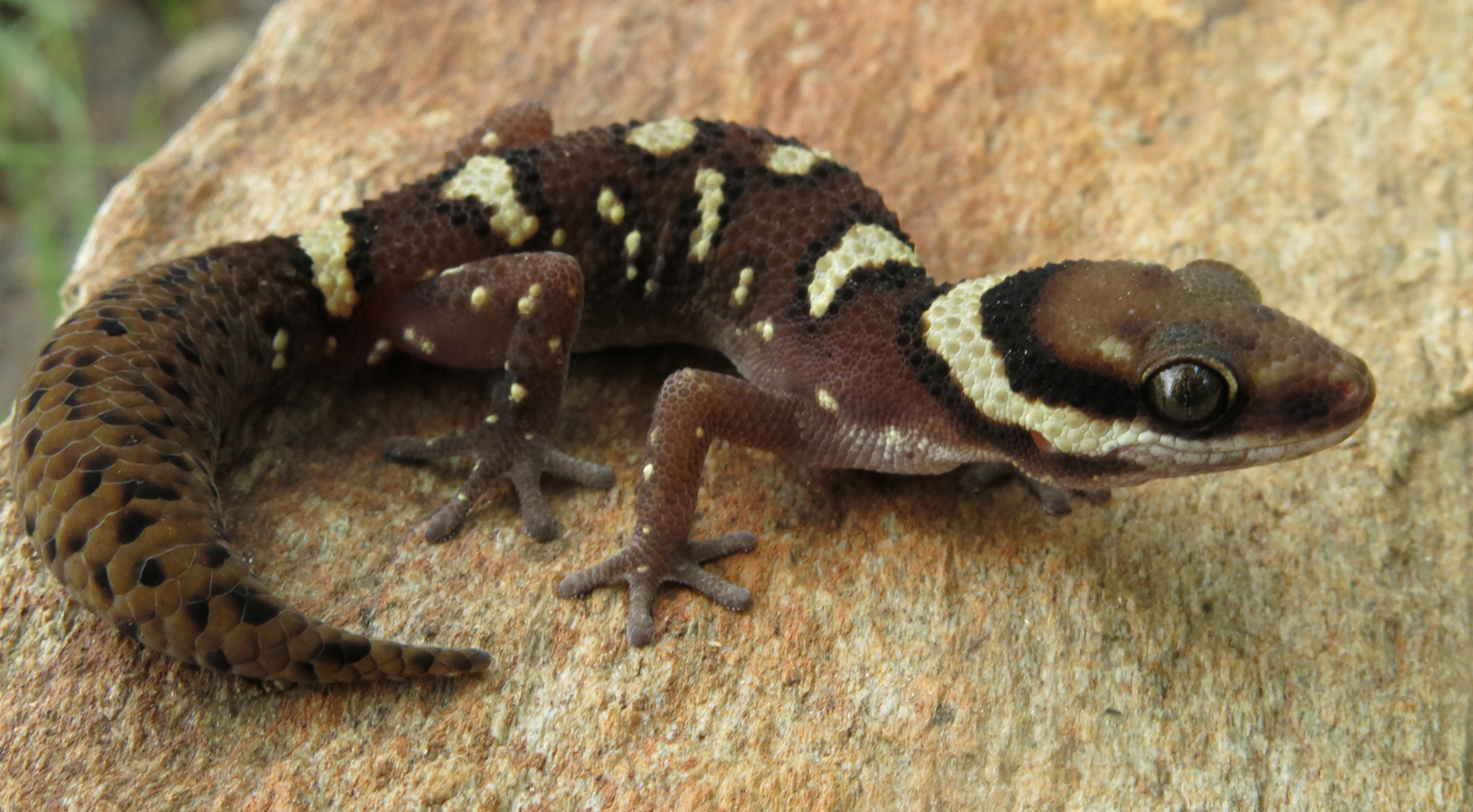

Conservation status
- Least Concern (IUCN 3.1)

Scientific classification
- Kingdom: Animalia
- Phylum: Chordata
- Class: Reptilia
- Order: Squamata
- Suborder: Gekkota
- Family: Gekkonidae
- Genus: Pachydactylus
- Species: P. oshaughnessyi

Binomial name
- Pachydactylus oshaughnessyi Boulenger, 1885

Synonyms
- Pachydactylus oshaughnessyi Boulenger, 1885; Pachydactylus capensis o'shaughnessyi — Hewitt, 1927; Pachydactylus capensis levyi V. FitzSimons, 1933; Pachydactylus capensis oshaughnessyi — Loveridge, 1947; Pachydactylus oshaughnessyi — Branch, 1998

= Pachydactylus oshaughnessyi =

Species of lizard

Pachydactylus oshaughnessyi is a species of lizard in the family Gekkonidae. The species is native to southern Africa.

== Etymology ==
The specific name, oshaughnessyi, is in honor of Arthur O'Shaughnessy, who was a British herpetologist and poet.

== Geographic range ==
Pachydactylus oshaughnessyi is found in South Africa and Zimbabwe.

== Habitat ==
The preferred habitat of Pachydactylus oshaughnessyi is mesic savanna.

== Description ==
Adults of Pachydactylus oshaughnessyi usually have a snout-to-vent length (SVL) of 4.5–5.5 cm (1.8–2.2 in).

== Reproduction ==
Pachydactylus oshaughnessyi is oviparous.
