= Monica's gecko =

Conservation status
- Least Concern (IUCN 3.1)

Scientific classification
- Kingdom: Animalia
- Phylum: Chordata
- Class: Reptilia
- Order: Squamata
- Suborder: Gekkota
- Family: Gekkonidae
- Genus: Pachydactylus
- Species: P. monicae

Binomial name
- Pachydactylus monicae Bauer, Lamb & Branch, 2006

Species of lizard

Monica's gecko (Pachydactylus monicae), also known commonly as Monica's thick-toed gecko, is a species of lizard in the family Gekkonidae. The species is native to southern Africa.

== Etymology ==
The specific name, monicae, is in honor of Monica Frelow Bauer who is the wife of Aaron M. Bauer.

== Habitat ==
Pachydactylus monicae is found in mesic microhabitats near rivers and adjacent rocky outcrops in arid habitats. P. monicae is generally found below elevations of 100 meters (328 feet), but also can be found on the lower slopes of mountains up to 900 m (3,000 ft).

== Geographic range ==
Pachydactylus monicae is found in the Lüdertiz and Karasburg districts of Namibia and the most northwestern part of the Northern Cape in South Africa.

== Description ==
Relatively large for its genus, Pachydactylus monicae may attain a snout-to-vent length (SVL) of 4.8 cm (1.9 in).

== Reproduction ==
Pachydactylus monicae is oviparous.
