= Wahlberg's Kalahari gecko =

Scientific classification
- Kingdom: Animalia
- Phylum: Chordata
- Class: Reptilia
- Order: Squamata
- Suborder: Gekkota
- Family: Gekkonidae
- Genus: Pachydactylus
- Species: P. wahlbergii

Binomial name
- Pachydactylus wahlbergii W. Peters, 1869

Synonyms
- Colopus wahlbergii W. Peters, 1869; Colopus kalaharicus V. FitzSimons, 1932; Colopus marshalli V. FitzSimons, 1959; Pachydactylus wahlbergii — Heinicke et al., 2017

Species of gecko

Wahlberg's Kalahari gecko (Pachydactylus wahlbergii), also known commonly as the Kalahari ground gecko, is a species of lizard in the family Gekkonidae. The species is native to southern Africa.

== Etymology ==
The specific name, wahlbergii, is in honor of Swedish naturalist Johan August Wahlberg.

== Geographic range ==
P. wahlbergii is found in Botswana, Namibia, and South Africa.

== Description ==
P. wahlbergii is small, elongate, and pretty. Snout-to-vent length (SVL) of adults is 4.5–5 cm (1.8–2.0 in).

== Reproduction ==
P. wahlbergii is oviparous. The adult female lays a clutch of two eggs.

== Subspecies ==
The genus contains two subspecies, including the nominotypical subspecies, which are recognized as being valid:

- Pachydactylus wahlbergii furcifer Haacke, 1976
- Pachydactylus wahlbergii wahlbergii W. Peters, 1869
