= Pachydactylus boehmei =

Conservation status
- Least Concern (IUCN 3.1)

Scientific classification
- Kingdom: Animalia
- Phylum: Chordata
- Class: Reptilia
- Order: Squamata
- Suborder: Gekkota
- Family: Gekkonidae
- Genus: Pachydactylus
- Species: P. boehmei

Binomial name
- Pachydactylus boehmei Bauer, 2010

Species of lizard

Pachydactylus boehmei is a species of thick-toed gecko belonging to the Pachydactylus weberi group, found in Namibia.

== Etymology ==
The specific name, boehmei, is in honor of German herpetologist Wolfgang Böhme.
