= Pachydactylus haackei =

Conservation status
- Least Concern (IUCN 3.1)

Scientific classification
- Kingdom: Animalia
- Phylum: Chordata
- Class: Reptilia
- Order: Squamata
- Suborder: Gekkota
- Family: Gekkonidae
- Genus: Pachydactylus
- Species: P. haackei

Binomial name
- Pachydactylus haackei Branch, Bauer & Good, 1996

Species of lizard

Pachydactylus haackei, also known commonly as Haacke's gecko or Haacke's thick-toed gecko, is a species of lizard in the family Gekkonidae. The species is native to Southern Africa.

== Etymology ==
The specific name, haackei, and the common names are in honor of herpetologist Wulf Dietrich Haacke (born 1936) of the Transvaal Museum.

== Geographic range ==
P. haackei is found in southern Namibia and South Africa.

== Habitat ==
The preferred natural habitat of P. haackei is rocky areas of shrubland, at altitudes of 100–1,600 m (330–5,250 ft).

== Description ==
Adults of P. haackei usually have a snout-to-vent length (SVL) of 7 to 8 cm (2.8 to 3.1 in). The maximum recorded SVL is 8.5 cm (3.3 in). The body is stout, and the ear opening tends to be squarish.

== Behavior ==
P. haackei is terrestrial and rupicolous (rock-dwelling).

== Reproduction ==
P. haackei is oviparous.
