= Pachydactylus acuminatus =

Conservation status
- Least Concern (IUCN 3.1)

Scientific classification
- Kingdom: Animalia
- Phylum: Chordata
- Class: Reptilia
- Order: Squamata
- Suborder: Gekkota
- Family: Gekkonidae
- Genus: Pachydactylus
- Species: P. acuminatus

Binomial name
- Pachydactylus acuminatus FitzSimons, 1941

Synonyms
- Pachydactylus weberi acuminatus, FitzSimons 1941

Species of lizard

Pachydactylus acuminatus is a species of lizard in the family Gekkonidae, a family also known as the typical geckos. The species P. acuminatus is endemic to Namibia. It was once believed to be a subspecies of Weber's thick-toed gecko (Pachydactylus weberi) but was lifted to species status in 2006.

== Discovery and taxonomy ==
Pachydactylus acuminatus was originally described by Vivian Frederick Maynard FitzSimons in 1941 as Pachydactylus weberi acuminatus, from eight specimens housed in the Transvaal Museum, Pretoria—seven immature individuals and one adult. The position of Pachydactylus weberi acuminatus was later reassessed by A. M. Bauer, who lifted it to species status in 2006.

== Distribution ==
P. acuminatus is known only from Namibia, in the Lüderitz, Bethanie, Keetmanshoop, Maltahöhe, and Swakopmund districts.
