= Pachydactylus otaviensis =

Conservation status
- Least Concern (IUCN 3.1)

Scientific classification
- Kingdom: Animalia
- Phylum: Chordata
- Class: Reptilia
- Order: Squamata
- Suborder: Gekkota
- Family: Gekkonidae
- Genus: Pachydactylus
- Species: P. otaviensis

Binomial name
- Pachydactylus otaviensis Bauer, Lamb, & Branch, 2006

Species of lizard

Pachydactylus otaviensis is a species of lizard in the family Gekkonidae. It is endemic to Namibia.

== Etymology ==
Its species name, composed of otavi and the Latin suffix -ensis, "that lives in, that inhabits", was given in reference to the place where it was discovered, Otaviberge.
