= Pachydactylus barnardi =

Conservation status
- Least Concern (IUCN 3.1)

Scientific classification
- Kingdom: Animalia
- Phylum: Chordata
- Class: Reptilia
- Order: Squamata
- Suborder: Gekkota
- Family: Gekkonidae
- Genus: Pachydactylus
- Species: P. barnardi

Binomial name
- Pachydactylus barnardi V. FitzSimons, 1941

Synonyms
- Pachydactylus capensis barnardi V. FitzSimons, 1941; Pachydactylus barnardi — Lamb & Bauer, 2000; Pachydactylus rugosus barnardi — Rösler, 2000; Pachydactylus barnardi — Mashinini & Mahlangu, 2013

Species of lizard

Pachydactylus barnardi, also known commonly as Barnard's rough gecko or Barnard's thick-toed gecko, is a species of lizard in the family Gekkonidae. The species is indigenous to Southern Africa.

== Etymology ==
The specific name, barnardi, is in honor of South African zoologist Keppel Harcourt Barnard.

== Geographic range ==
P. barnardi is found in Namibia and South Africa (Cape Province and southern Little Namaqualand).

== Habitat ==
The preferred natural habitat of P. barnardi is shrubland.

== Description ==
On its back, P. barnardi has rows of enlarged tubercles, separated by small granular scales. Adults have a snout-to-vent length of 4.5–6.0 cm (1.8–2.4 in).

== Reproduction ==
P. barnardi is oviparous.
