= Pachydactylus griffini =

Conservation status
- Least Concern (IUCN 3.1)

Scientific classification
- Kingdom: Animalia
- Phylum: Chordata
- Class: Reptilia
- Order: Squamata
- Suborder: Gekkota
- Family: Gekkonidae
- Genus: Pachydactylus
- Species: P. griffini

Binomial name
- Pachydactylus griffini Bauer, Lamb & Branch, 2006

Species of lizard

Pachydactylus griffini is a species of lizard in the family Gekkonidae. The species is endemic to Namibia.

== Etymology ==
The specific name, griffini, is in honor of American zoologist Michael "Mike" Griffin who worked in Namibia for many years.

== Geographic range ==
P. griffini is found in southeastern Namibia.

== Habitat ==
The preferred natural habitat of P. griffini is savanna, at altitudes of 1,000–1,200 m (3,300–3,900 ft).

== Description ==
Small for its genus, P. griffini may attain a snout-to-vent length (SVL) of 39 mm (1.5 in).

== Behavior ==
P. griffini is terrestrial and nocturnal.

== Reproduction ==
P. griffini is oviparous.
