= Pachydactylus reconditus =

Conservation status
- Least Concern (IUCN 3.1)

Scientific classification
- Kingdom: Animalia
- Phylum: Chordata
- Class: Reptilia
- Order: Squamata
- Suborder: Gekkota
- Family: Gekkonidae
- Genus: Pachydactylus
- Species: P. reconditus

Binomial name
- Pachydactylus reconditus Bauer, Lamb, & Branch, 2006

Species of lizard

Pachydactylus reconditus is a species of lizard in the family Gekkonidae. It is endemic to Namibia.
