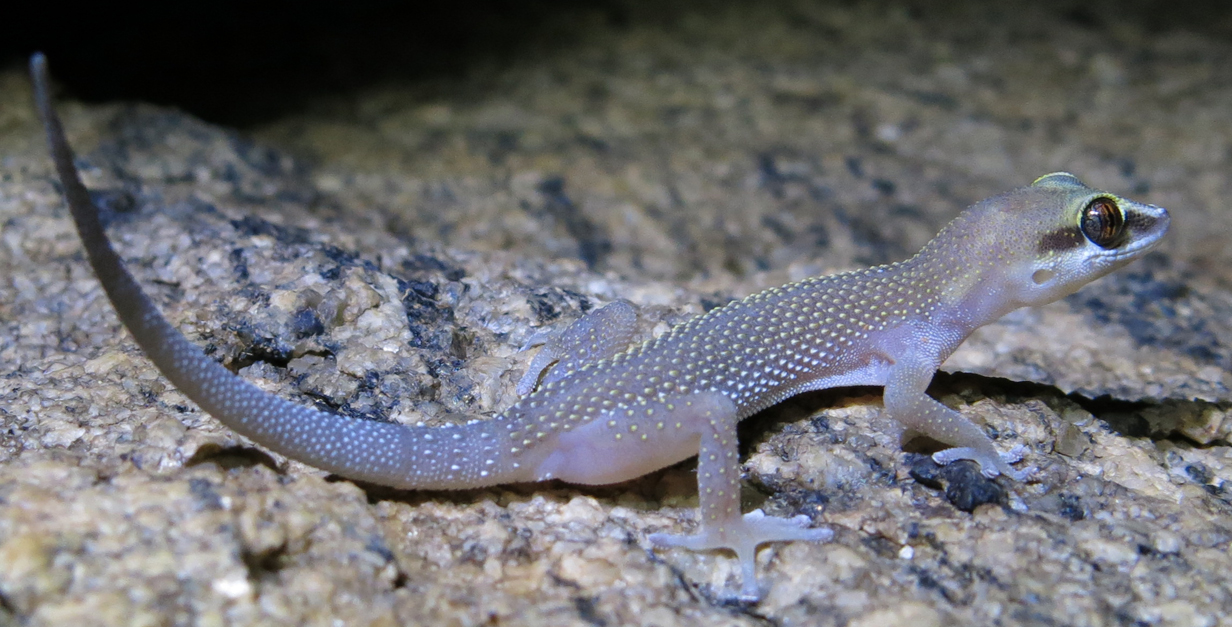

Conservation status
- Least Concern (IUCN 3.1)

Scientific classification
- Kingdom: Animalia
- Phylum: Chordata
- Class: Reptilia
- Order: Squamata
- Suborder: Gekkota
- Family: Gekkonidae
- Genus: Pachydactylus
- Species: P. atorquatus

Binomial name
- Pachydactylus atorquatus Bauer, Barts & Hulbert, 2006

Synonyms
- Pachydactylus weberi (part) — Bauer & Lamb, 2005; Pachydactylus atorquatus Bauer, Barts & Hulbert, 2006; Pachydactylus goodi Bauer, Lamb & Branch, 2006; Pachydactylus atorquatus — Bates et al., 2014

= Pachydactylus atorquatus =

Species of lizard

Pachydactylus atorquatus, also known commonly as the Augrabies gecko and Good's gecko, is a species of thick-toed gecko, a lizard in the family Gekkonidae. The species is native to southern Africa.

== Taxonomy ==
P. atorquatus belongs to the P. weberi species group.

== Geographic range ==
P. atorquatus is found in Namibia and South Africa.

== Habitat ==
The preferred natural habitat of P. atorquatus is rocky areas in shrubland, at altitudes of 500–800 m (1,600–2,600 ft).

== Description ==
Large for its genus, P. atorquatus may attain a snout-to-vent length (SVL) of 5.0 cm (2.0 in). It is the only species in the weberi group which does not have a pale collar as a hatchling or juvenile, a key character to which the specific name atorquatus refers.

== Reproduction ==
P. atorquatus is oviparous.

== Etymology ==
The synonym P. goodi was named in honor of herpetologist David Andrew Good.
