= Large-scaled banded gecko =

Conservation status
- Least Concern (IUCN 3.1)

Scientific classification
- Kingdom: Animalia
- Phylum: Chordata
- Order: Squamata
- Suborder: Gekkota
- Family: Gekkonidae
- Genus: Pachydactylus
- Species: P. macrolepis

Binomial name
- Pachydactylus macrolepis FitzSimons, 1939

Synonyms
- Pachydactylus mariquensis macrolepis

Species of lizard

The large-scaled banded gecko (Pachydactylus macrolepis) is a species of lizard in the family Gekkonidae. It is found in South Africa.
