= Pachydactylus mclachlani =

Conservation status
- Least Concern (IUCN 3.1)

Scientific classification
- Kingdom: Animalia
- Phylum: Chordata
- Class: Reptilia
- Order: Squamata
- Suborder: Gekkota
- Family: Gekkonidae
- Genus: Pachydactylus
- Species: P. mclachlani

Binomial name
- Pachydactylus mclachlani Bauer, Lamb & Branch, 2006

Species of lizard

Pachydactylus mclachlani is a species of lizard in the family Gekkonidae. The species is endemic to Namibia.

== Etymology ==
The specific name, mclachlani, is in honor of Geoffrey Roy McLachlan (1923–2005), who was a South African ornithologist and herpetologist.

== Description ==
P. mclachlani is relatively large for its genus. Adults may attain a snout-to-vent length (SVL) of about 5 cm (2.0 in).

== Reproduction ==
P. mclachlani is oviparous.
