= Sossus gecko =

Conservation status
- Least Concern (IUCN 3.1)

Scientific classification
- Kingdom: Animalia
- Phylum: Chordata
- Class: Reptilia
- Order: Squamata
- Suborder: Gekkota
- Family: Gekkonidae
- Genus: Pachydactylus
- Species: P. etultra

Binomial name
- Pachydactylus etultra Branch, Bauer, Jackman, & Heinicke, 2011

Species of lizard

The Sossus gecko (Pachydactylus etultra) is a species of lizard in the family Gekkonidae. It is endemic to Namibia.

The Sossus Gecko is known as the Namib Sand Gecko. This is a small lizard measuring around 10 centimeters the tail can be as long as the Sossus Gecko body. Its skin is rough helping the lizard blend in with its environment. The Sossus Gecko has a lifespan of seven years, it lives in nocturnal and terrestrials' areas. Sossus Gecko feed on insects in its environment. The Sossus Gecko is known as a survivor of desert and extreme climates. When the sand is too hot to walk on in the desert the lizard seeks shelter in burrows or beneath rocks. During the day the Sossus Gecko sleeps conserving energy for later avoiding the desert sun and at night the lizard becomes active looking for food interacting with other geckos including defending its territory or a male seeking a female's attention to mate. The Sossus Gecko detaches its tail as a defense mechanism, continuing to wiggle around distracting the predator while the Sossus Gecko makes its escape.
