= Visser's gecko =

Conservation status
- Least Concern (IUCN 3.1)

Scientific classification
- Kingdom: Animalia
- Phylum: Chordata
- Class: Reptilia
- Order: Squamata
- Suborder: Gekkota
- Family: Gekkonidae
- Genus: Pachydactylus
- Species: P. visseri

Binomial name
- Pachydactylus visseri Bauer, Lamb & Branch, 2006

Species of lizard

Visser's gecko (Pachydactylus visseri) is a species of lizard in the family Gekkonidae. The species is native to southern Africa.

== Etymology ==
The specific name, visseri, is in honor of South African herpetologist John Duckitt Visser (1938–2012).

== Geographic range ==
P. visseri is found in Namibia and South Africa.

== Description ==
P. visseri may attain a snout-to-vent length (SVL) of 4.85 cm (1.91 in). The tail is long, 120% SVL.

== Reproduction ==
P. visseri is oviparous.
