= Werner's thick-toed gecko =

Conservation status
- Least Concern (IUCN 3.1)

Scientific classification
- Kingdom: Animalia
- Phylum: Chordata
- Class: Reptilia
- Order: Squamata
- Suborder: Gekkota
- Family: Gekkonidae
- Genus: Pachydactylus
- Species: P. werneri

Binomial name
- Pachydactylus werneri Hewitt, 1935

Synonyms
- Pachydactylus capensis werneri Hewitt, 1935; Pachydactylus werneri — V. FitzSimons, 1943; Pachydactylus weberi werneri — Loveridge, 1947; Pachydactylus werneri — Wermuth, 1965

Species of lizard

Werner's thick-toed gecko (Pachydactylus werneri) is a species of lizard in the family Gekkonidae. The species is endemic to Namibia.

== Etymology ==
The specific name, werneri, is in honor of Austrian herpetologist Franz Werner.

== Geographic range ==
In Namibia P. werneri is found in the areas around Karibib, Maltahöhe, and Swakopmund.

== Description ==
P. werneri may attain a snout-to-vent length (SVL) of 5.25 cm (2.07 in).

== Reproduction ==
P. werneri is oviparous.
