= Pachydactylus robertsi =

Conservation status
- Least Concern (IUCN 3.1)

Scientific classification
- Kingdom: Animalia
- Phylum: Chordata
- Class: Reptilia
- Order: Squamata
- Suborder: Gekkota
- Family: Gekkonidae
- Genus: Pachydactylus
- Species: P. robertsi

Binomial name
- Pachydactylus robertsi V. FitzSimons, 1938

Synonyms
- Pachydactylus robertsi V. FitzSimons, 1938; Pachydactylus scutatus robertsi — Loveridge, 1944; Pachydactylus robertsi — Bauer et al., 2002

Species of lizard

Pachydactylus robertsi, commonly known as the large-scaled gecko, shielded thick-toed gecko, or Rauhschuppen-Dickfingergecko in German, is an African species of gecko.

== Geographic range ==
P. robertsi is found near Keetmanshoop and Karasburg where the type specimen was caught in the Great Karas Mountains in southern Namibia.

== Conservation status ==
Although there are no obvious immediate threats to the species P. robertsi, it appears to have a limited distribution which would make it more vulnerable to habitat loss.

== Etymology ==
The specific name, robertsi, is in honour of South African zoologist J. Austin Roberts, who was part of the Expedition to South-West Africa and Little Namaqualand when the types specimen was collected on 12 August 1937.

== Description ==
The shielded thick-toed gecko is a light olive brown colour with darker spots that cover the back; a line of these darker spots runs down the spine. It has a dark line that runs from the snout through the eye; this line is bordered on either side by pale lines.

The underside of the head, throat, body and limbs are a much paler colour.

The tail is a more uniform olive brown colour.

Pachydactylus robertsi may be confused with Pachydactylus scutatus but can be differentiated by the exclusion of the rostral scale from the nostril. Also, P. robertsi has a wider (2–3 scale rows) nuchal band (vs 1 scale row in P. scutatus).

== See also ==
- Snake scales
