= Richtersveld gecko =

Conservation status
- Least Concern (IUCN 3.1)

Scientific classification
- Kingdom: Animalia
- Phylum: Chordata
- Class: Reptilia
- Order: Squamata
- Suborder: Gekkota
- Family: Gekkonidae
- Genus: Pachydactylus
- Species: P. carinatus

Binomial name
- Pachydactylus carinatus Bauer, Lamb, & Branch, 2006

Species of lizard

The Richtersveld gecko (Pachydactylus carinatus) is a species of lizard in the family Gekkonidae. It is found in South Africa and Namibia.
