= Pachydactylus parascutatus =

Conservation status
- Least Concern (IUCN 3.1)

Scientific classification
- Kingdom: Animalia
- Phylum: Chordata
- Class: Reptilia
- Order: Squamata
- Suborder: Gekkota
- Family: Gekkonidae
- Genus: Pachydactylus
- Species: P. parascutatus

Binomial name
- Pachydactylus parascutatus Bauer, Lamb & Branch, 2002

Species of lizard

Pachydactylus parascutatus is a species of lizard in the family Gekkonidae. It is endemic to Namibia.
