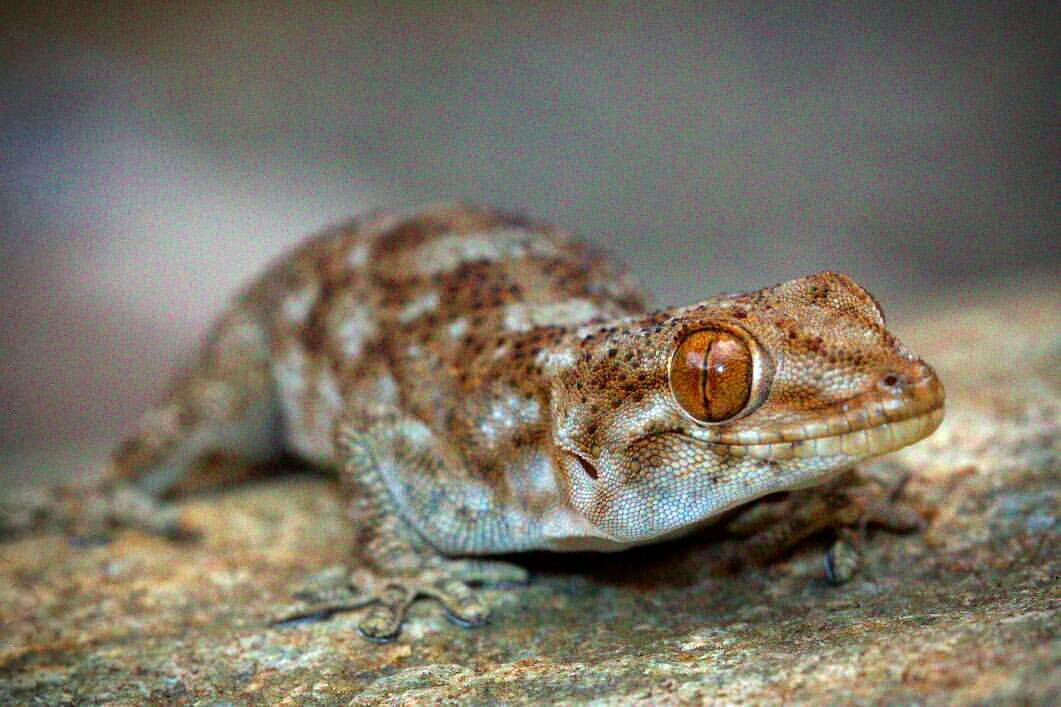
- in Klein Karoo, Western Cape, South Africa

Conservation status
- Least Concern (IUCN 3.1)

Scientific classification
- Kingdom: Animalia
- Phylum: Chordata
- Class: Reptilia
- Order: Squamata
- Suborder: Gekkota
- Family: Gekkonidae
- Genus: Pachydactylus
- Species: P. kladaroderma

Binomial name
- Pachydactylus kladaroderma Branch, Bauer, & Good, 1996

= Pachydactylus kladaroderma =

Species of lizard

Pachydactylus kladaroderma, also known as the thin-skinned gecko, fragile thick-toed gecko, or thin-skinned thick-toed gecko, is a member of the family Gekkonidae, also known as the typical geckos, found in South Africa.

== Etymology ==
The name "kladaroderma" is derived from the Greek "kladaros" which means "easily broken," and "derma" which means "skin." This is in reference to the fragile skin of the species.

== Description ==
Pachydactylus kladaroderma is differentiated from other members of the genus Pachydactylus by a low number of granules (3-6) bordering the mentals, an ear opening that resembles a slit, a 79% incidence of the superlabial entering the nostrils, the infralabials adjacent the mental (5-13,) and an overall dull brown coloring.

== Distribution ==
Known only from South Africa in the Cape Fold Mountains which surround the Little Karoo and the southern escarpment.
