= Pachydactylus oreophilus =

Conservation status
- Least Concern (IUCN 3.1)

Scientific classification
- Kingdom: Animalia
- Phylum: Chordata
- Class: Reptilia
- Order: Squamata
- Suborder: Gekkota
- Family: Gekkonidae
- Genus: Pachydactylus
- Species: P. oreophilus

Binomial name
- Pachydactylus oreophilus McLachlan & Spence, 1967

Species of lizard

Pachydactylus oreophilus, also known as the Kaokoland rock gecko or African thick-toed gecko, is a species of lizard in the family Gekkonidae. It is found in Namibia and Angola.
