= Namib desert gecko =

Conservation status
- Least Concern (IUCN 3.1)

Scientific classification
- Kingdom: Animalia
- Phylum: Chordata
- Class: Reptilia
- Order: Squamata
- Suborder: Gekkota
- Family: Gekkonidae
- Genus: Pachydactylus
- Species: P. vanzyli

Binomial name
- Pachydactylus vanzyli (Steyn & Haacke, 1966)

Synonyms
- Kaokogecko vanzyli Steyn & Haacke, 1966; Palmatogecko vanzyli — Kluge, 1993; Pachydactylus vanzyli — Bauer & Lamb, 2005

Species of lizard

The Namib desert gecko (Pachydactylus vanzyli), also known commonly as the Kaoko web-footed gecko, is a species of lizard in the family Gekkonidae. The species is native to southern Africa.

== Etymology ==
The specific name, vanzyli, is in honor of amateur naturalists Mr. & Mrs. Ben Van Zyl of Namibia.

== Geographic range ==
P. vanzyli is found in Angola and Namibia.

== Habitat ==
The preferred natural habitat of P. vanzyli is gravel plains.

== Description ==
Adults of P. vanzyli usually have a snout-to-vent length (SVL) of 5.0–5.5 cm (2.0–2.2 in). The maximum recorded SVL is 6.6 cm (2.6 in).

== Behavior ==
P. vanzyli is nocturnal.

== Diet ==
P. vanzyli preys upon small beetles and termites.

== Reproduction ==
P. vanzyli is oviparous.
