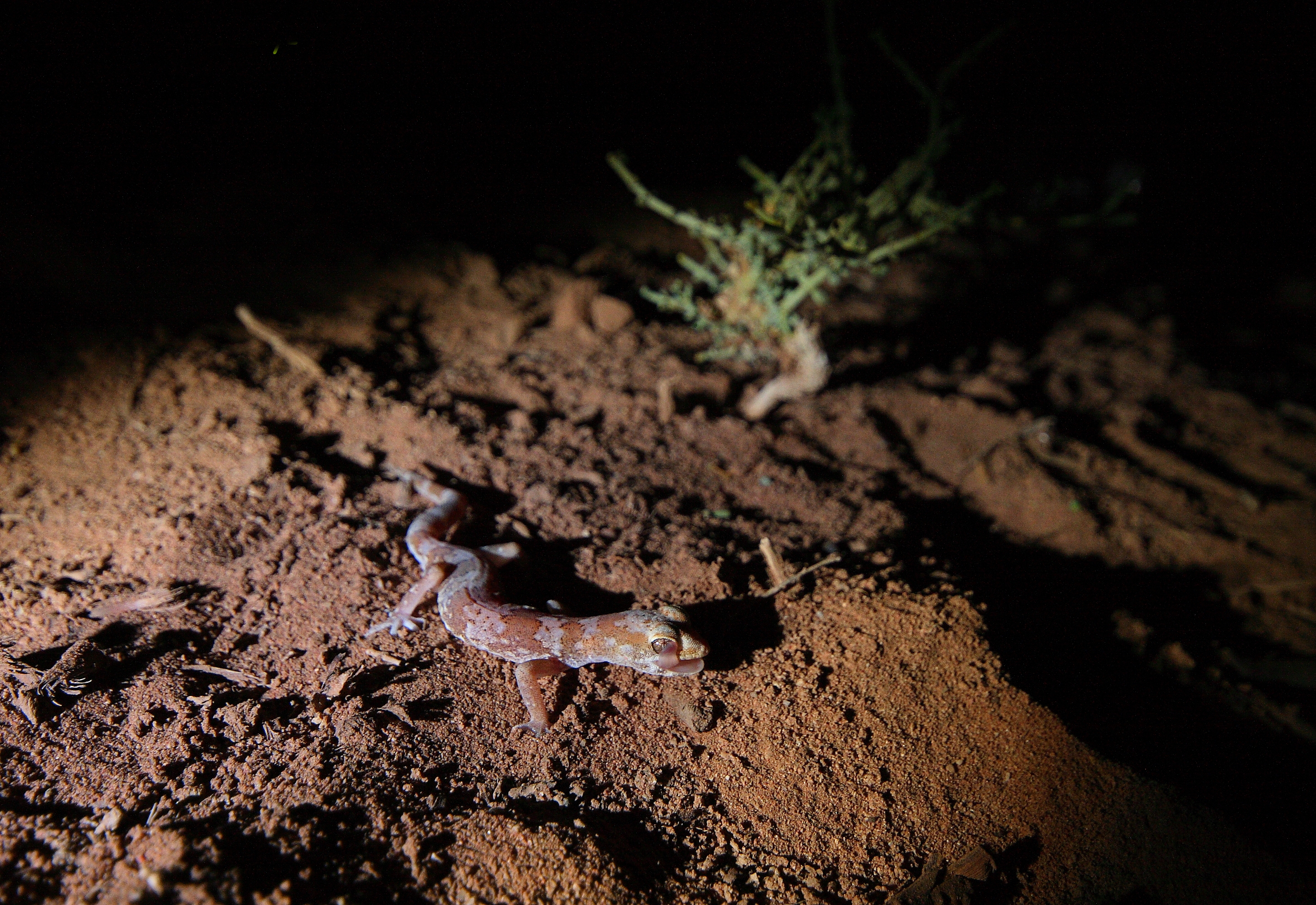

Conservation status
- Least Concern (IUCN 3.1)

Scientific classification
- Kingdom: Animalia
- Phylum: Chordata
- Class: Reptilia
- Order: Squamata
- Suborder: Gekkota
- Family: Gekkonidae
- Genus: Pachydactylus
- Species: P. mariquensis

Binomial name
- Pachydactylus mariquensis Smith, 1849

= Pachydactylus mariquensis =

Species of lizard

Pachydactylus mariquensis, also known as the common banded gecko, Ceres thick-toed gecko, or Marico thick-toed gecko, is a species of lizard in the family Gekkonidae. It is endemic to South Africa and Namibia.
