= Brandberg thick-toed gecko =

Conservation status
- Least Concern (IUCN 3.1)

Scientific classification
- Kingdom: Animalia
- Phylum: Chordata
- Class: Reptilia
- Order: Squamata
- Suborder: Gekkota
- Family: Gekkonidae
- Genus: Pachydactylus
- Species: P. gaiasensis

Binomial name
- Pachydactylus gaiasensis Steyn & Mitchell, 1967

Synonyms
- Pachydactylus oreophilus gaiasensis

Species of lizard

The Brandberg thick-toed gecko (Pachydactylus gaiasensis) is a species of lizard in the family Gekkonidae. It is endemic to Namibia.
