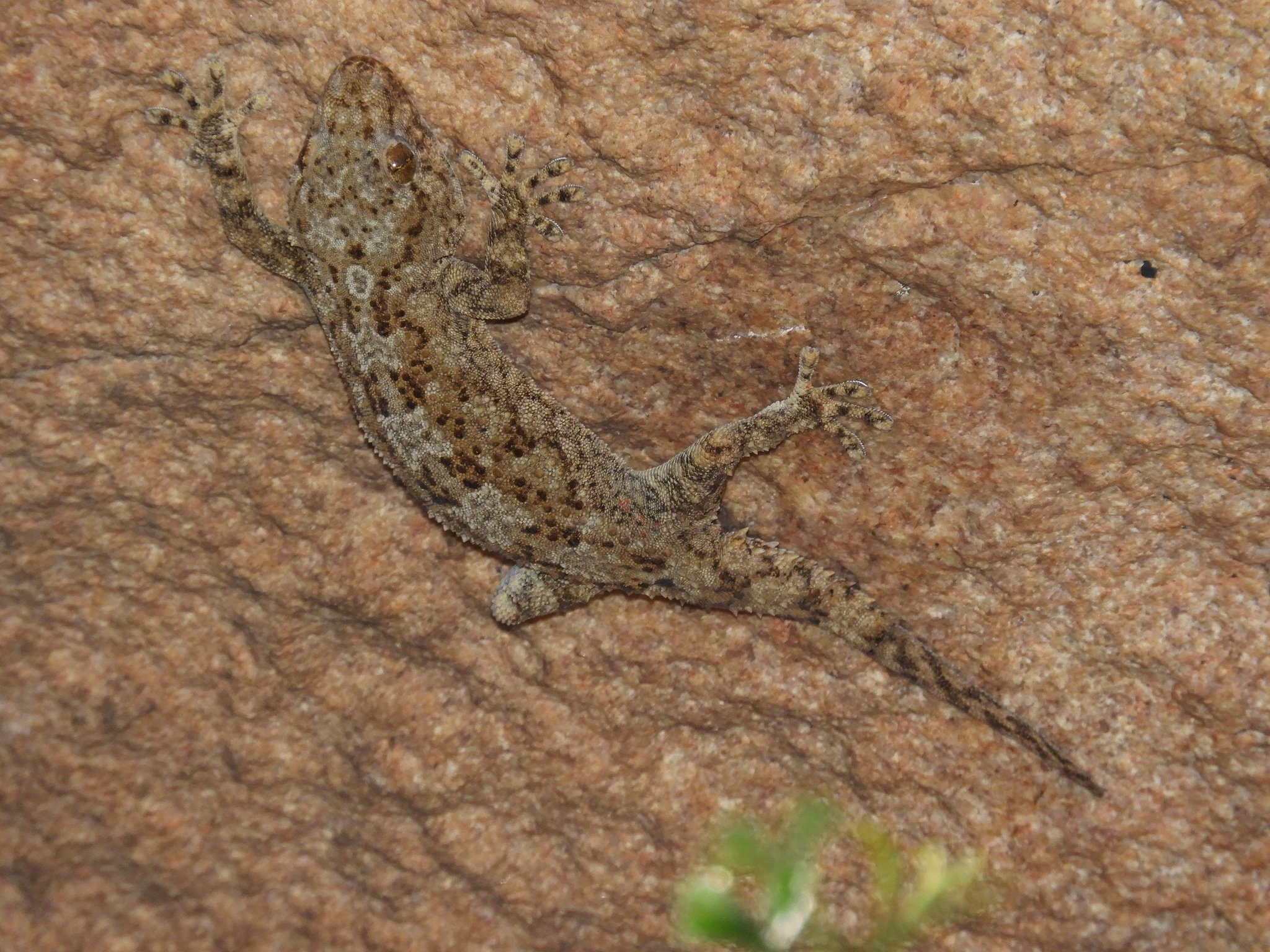

Conservation status
- Least Concern (IUCN 3.1)

Scientific classification
- Kingdom: Animalia
- Phylum: Chordata
- Class: Reptilia
- Order: Squamata
- Suborder: Gekkota
- Family: Gekkonidae
- Genus: Pachydactylus
- Species: P. namaquensis

Binomial name
- Pachydactylus namaquensis (Sclater, 1898)

= Namaqua thick-toed gecko =

Species of lizard

The Namaqua thick-toed gecko (Pachydactylus namaquensis) is a species of lizard in the family Gekkonidae. It is found in Namibia and South Africa.
