= Western spotted thick-toed gecko =

Conservation status
- Least Concern (IUCN 3.1)

Scientific classification
- Kingdom: Animalia
- Phylum: Chordata
- Class: Reptilia
- Order: Squamata
- Suborder: Gekkota
- Family: Gekkonidae
- Genus: Pachydactylus
- Species: P. serval

Binomial name
- Pachydactylus serval Werner, 1910

Species of lizard

The western spotted thick-toed gecko (Pachydactylus serval) is a species of lizard in the family Gekkonidae. It is endemic to Namibia and South Africa.
