= Pachydactylus formosus =

Conservation status
- Least Concern (IUCN 3.1)

Scientific classification
- Kingdom: Animalia
- Phylum: Chordata
- Class: Reptilia
- Order: Squamata
- Suborder: Gekkota
- Family: Gekkonidae
- Genus: Pachydactylus
- Species: P. formosus

Binomial name
- Pachydactylus formosus Smith, 1849

Synonyms
- Pachydactylus mento-marginatus Pachydactylus mentomarginatus Pachydactylus capensis formosus Pachydactylus rugosus formosus

Species of lizard

Pachydactylus formosus, also known as Smith's thick-toed gecko, southern rough gecko or Karoo gecko, is a species of lizard in the family Gekkonidae. It is found in South Africa, Namibia, and Botswana.
