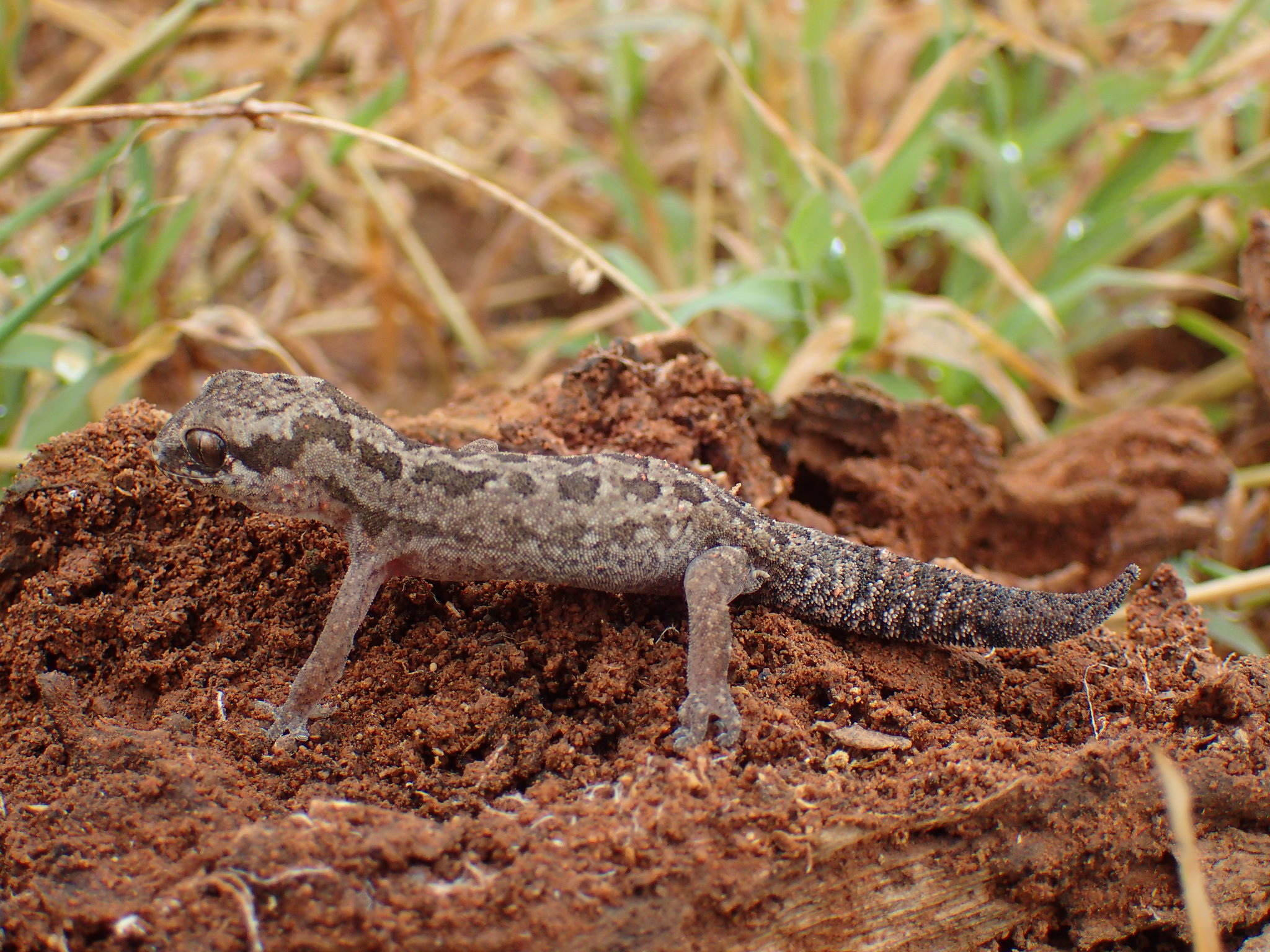

Conservation status
- Least Concern (IUCN 3.1)

Scientific classification
- Kingdom: Animalia
- Phylum: Chordata
- Class: Reptilia
- Order: Squamata
- Suborder: Gekkota
- Family: Gekkonidae
- Genus: Pachydactylus
- Species: P. maculatus

Binomial name
- Pachydactylus maculatus Gray, 1845

Synonyms
- Pachydactylus maculosa

= Spotted thick-toed gecko =

Species of lizard

The spotted thick-toed gecko (Pachydactylus maculatus) is a species of lizard in the family Gekkonidae. It is found in South Africa and Eswatini.
