= Two-coloured thick-toed gecko =

Conservation status
- Least Concern (IUCN 3.1)

Scientific classification
- Kingdom: Animalia
- Phylum: Chordata
- Class: Reptilia
- Order: Squamata
- Suborder: Gekkota
- Family: Gekkonidae
- Genus: Pachydactylus
- Species: P. bicolor

Binomial name
- Pachydactylus bicolor Hewitt, 1926

Synonyms
- Pachydactylus punctatus bicolor

Species of reptile

The two-coloured thick-toed gecko (Pachydactylus bicolor) is a species of lizard in the family of Gekkonidae. It is endemic to Namibia.
