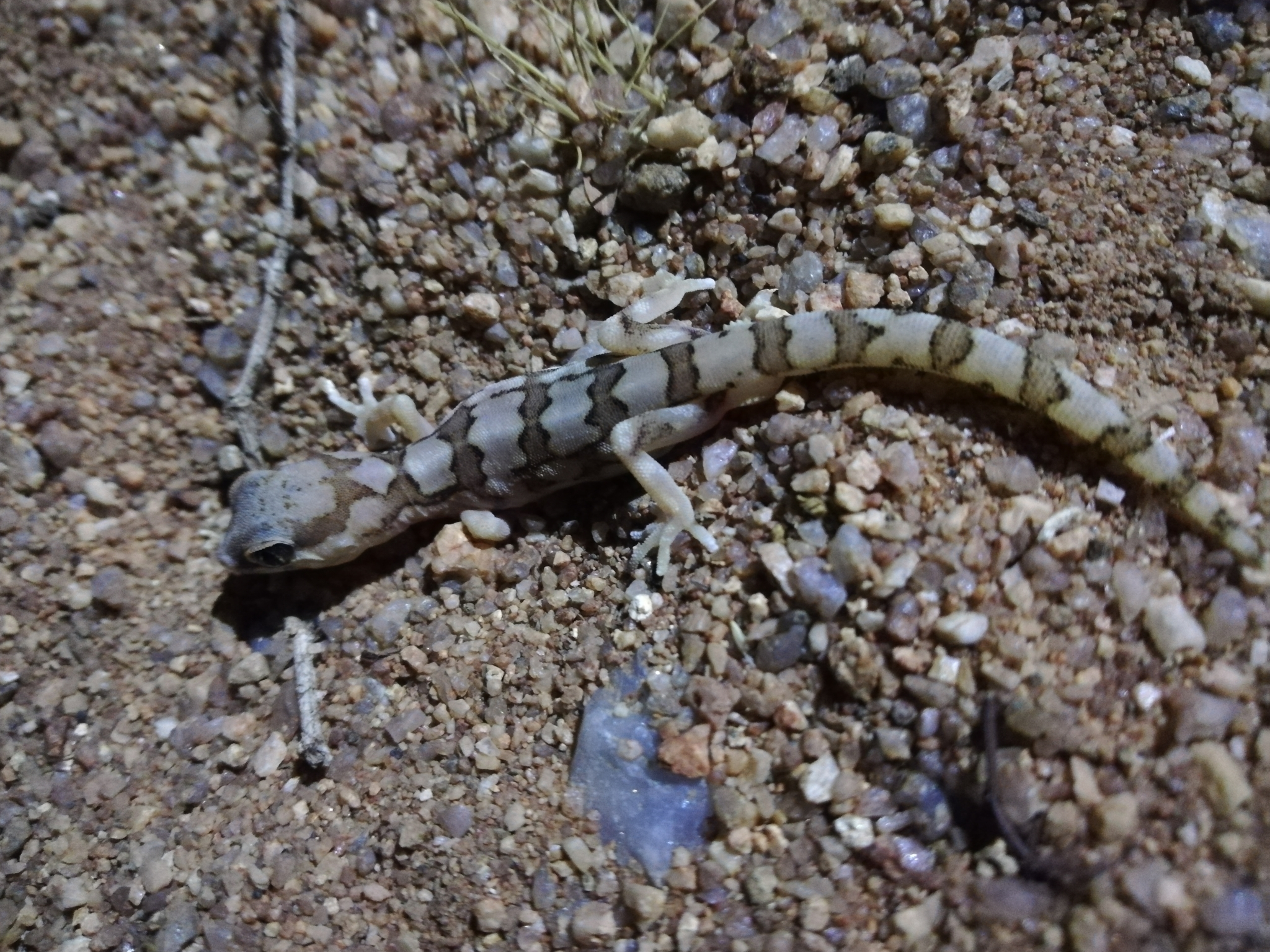
- P. amoenus in Nama Khoi Local Municipality, South Africa

Conservation status
- Least Concern (IUCN 3.1)

Scientific classification
- Kingdom: Animalia
- Phylum: Chordata
- Class: Reptilia
- Order: Squamata
- Suborder: Gekkota
- Family: Gekkonidae
- Genus: Pachydactylus
- Species: P. amoenus

Binomial name
- Pachydactylus amoenus Werner, 1910

= Pachydactylus amoenus =

Species of lizard

Pachydactylus amoenus, also known as Namaqua banded gecko or Kamaggas gecko, is a species of lizard in the family Gekkonidae. It is endemic to South Africa.
