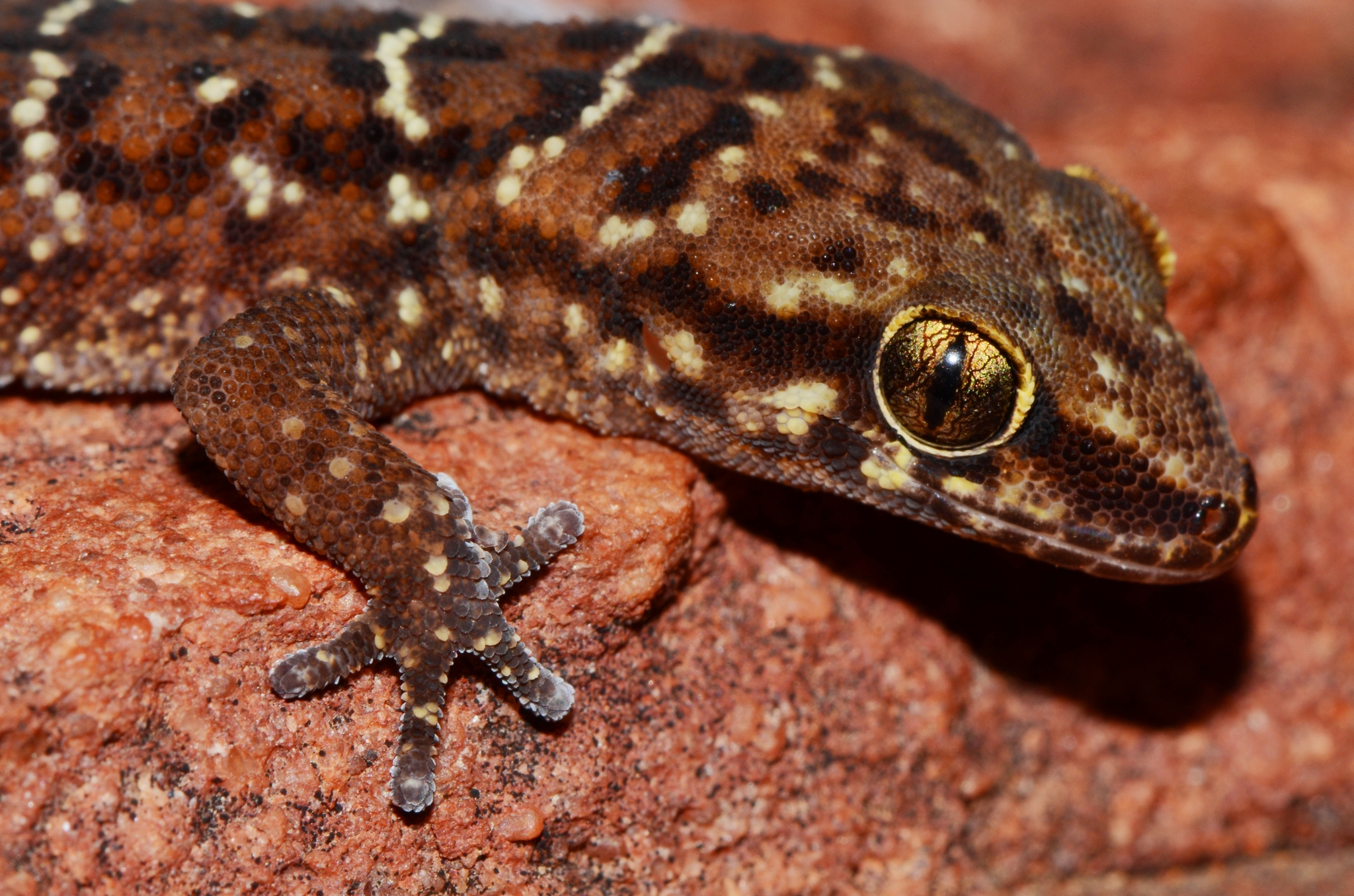

Conservation status
- Least Concern (IUCN 3.1)

Scientific classification
- Kingdom: Animalia
- Phylum: Chordata
- Class: Reptilia
- Order: Squamata
- Suborder: Gekkota
- Family: Gekkonidae
- Genus: Pachydactylus
- Species: P. affinis

Binomial name
- Pachydactylus affinis Boulenger, 1896
- Transvaal gecko distribution Extant (resident)

Synonyms
- Pachydactylus formosus affinis Pachydactylus capensis affinis

= Pachydactylus affinis =

Species of lizard

Pachydactylus affinis, also known as Transvaal gecko or Transvaal thick-toed gecko, is a species of lizard in the family Gekkonidae. It is found in South Africa and Zimbabwe.

== Gallery ==
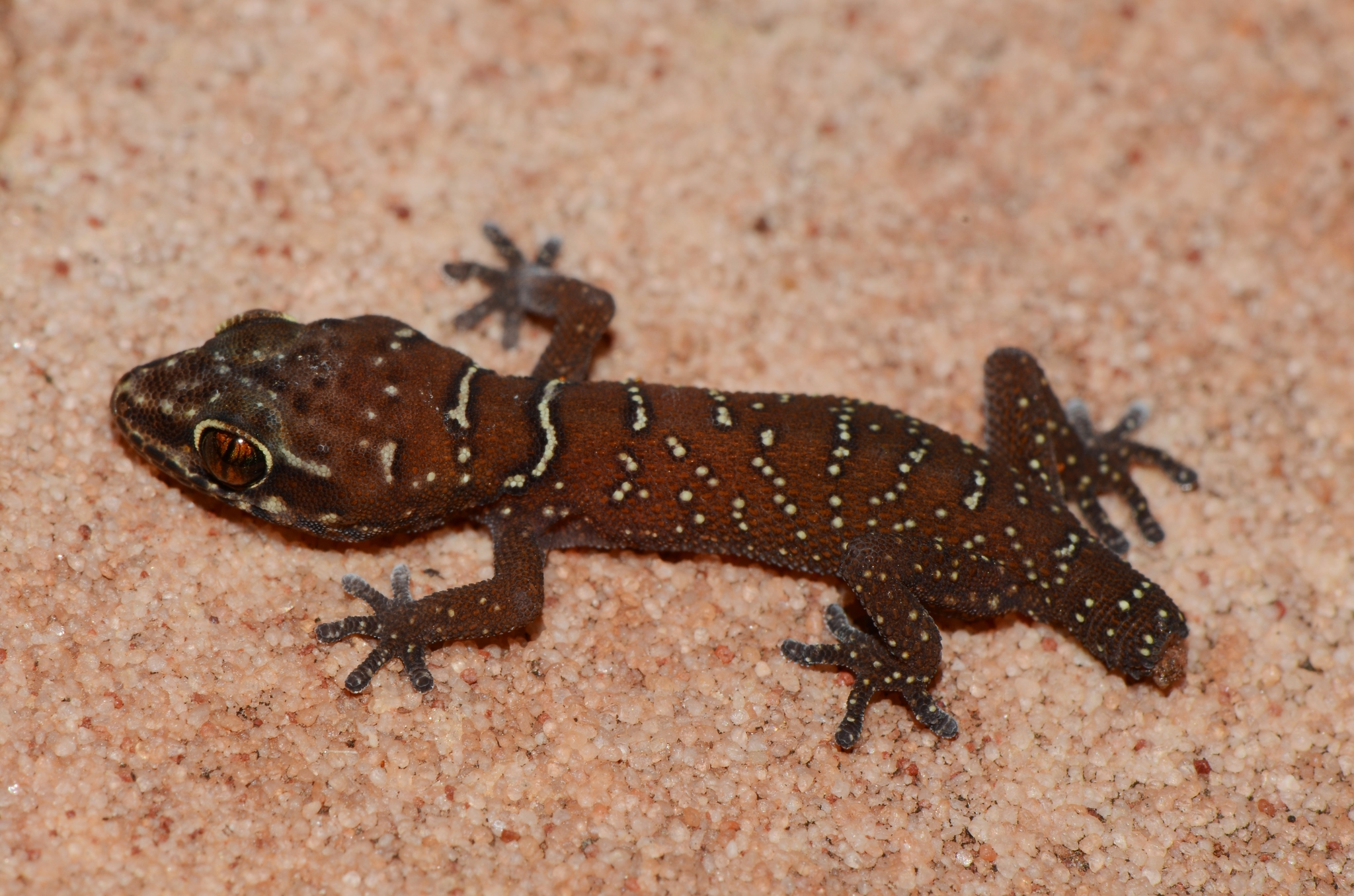

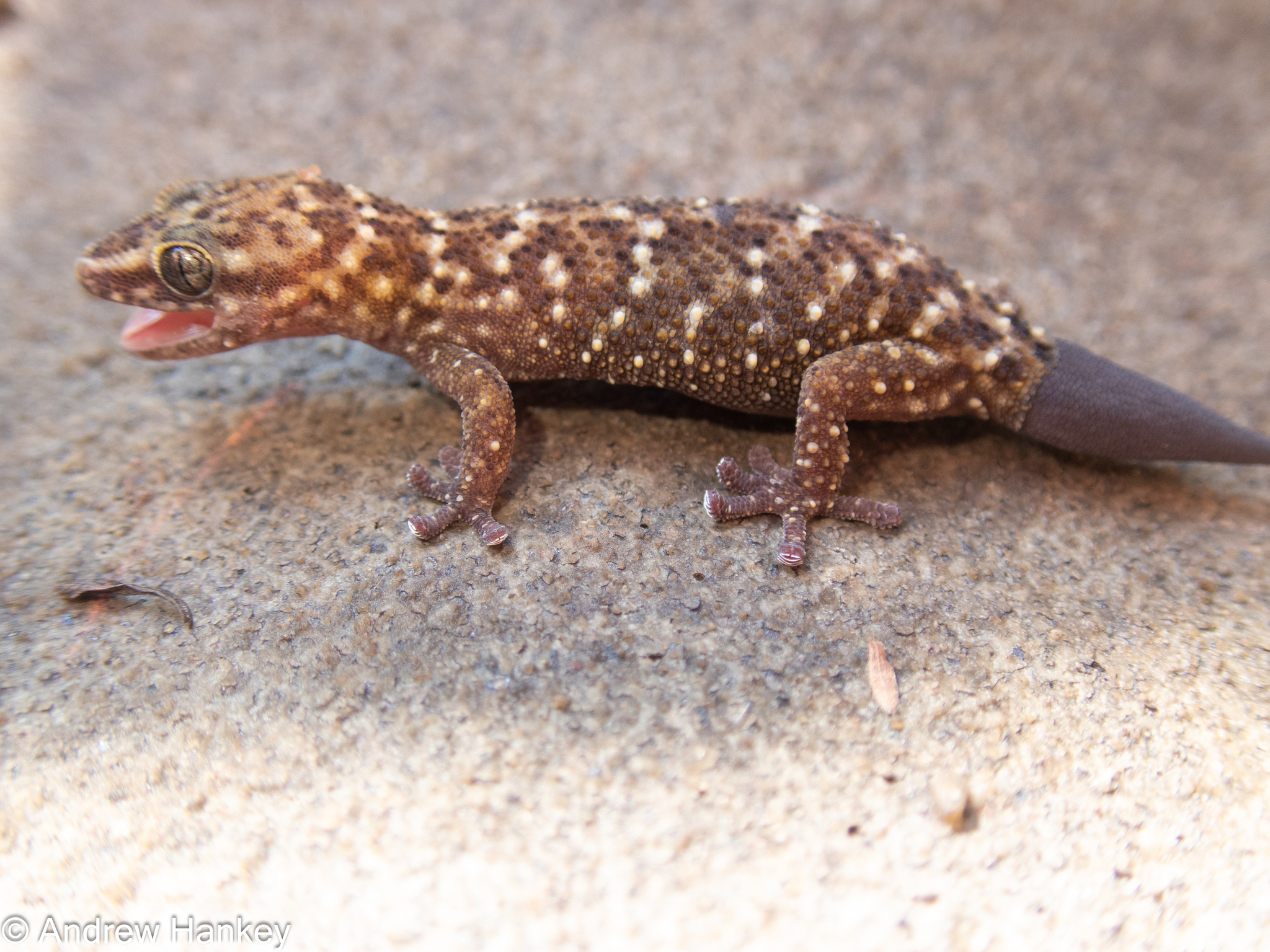

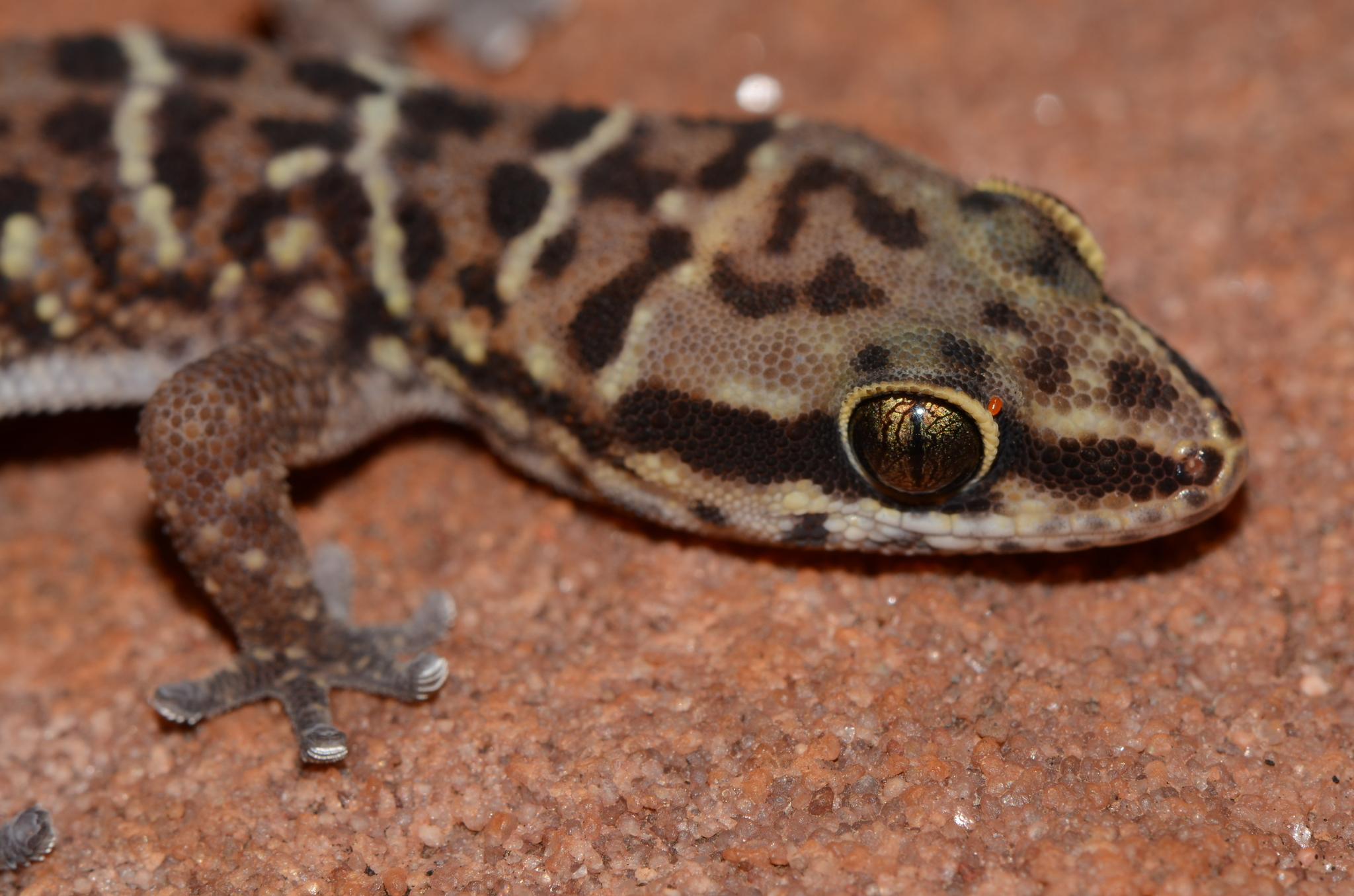

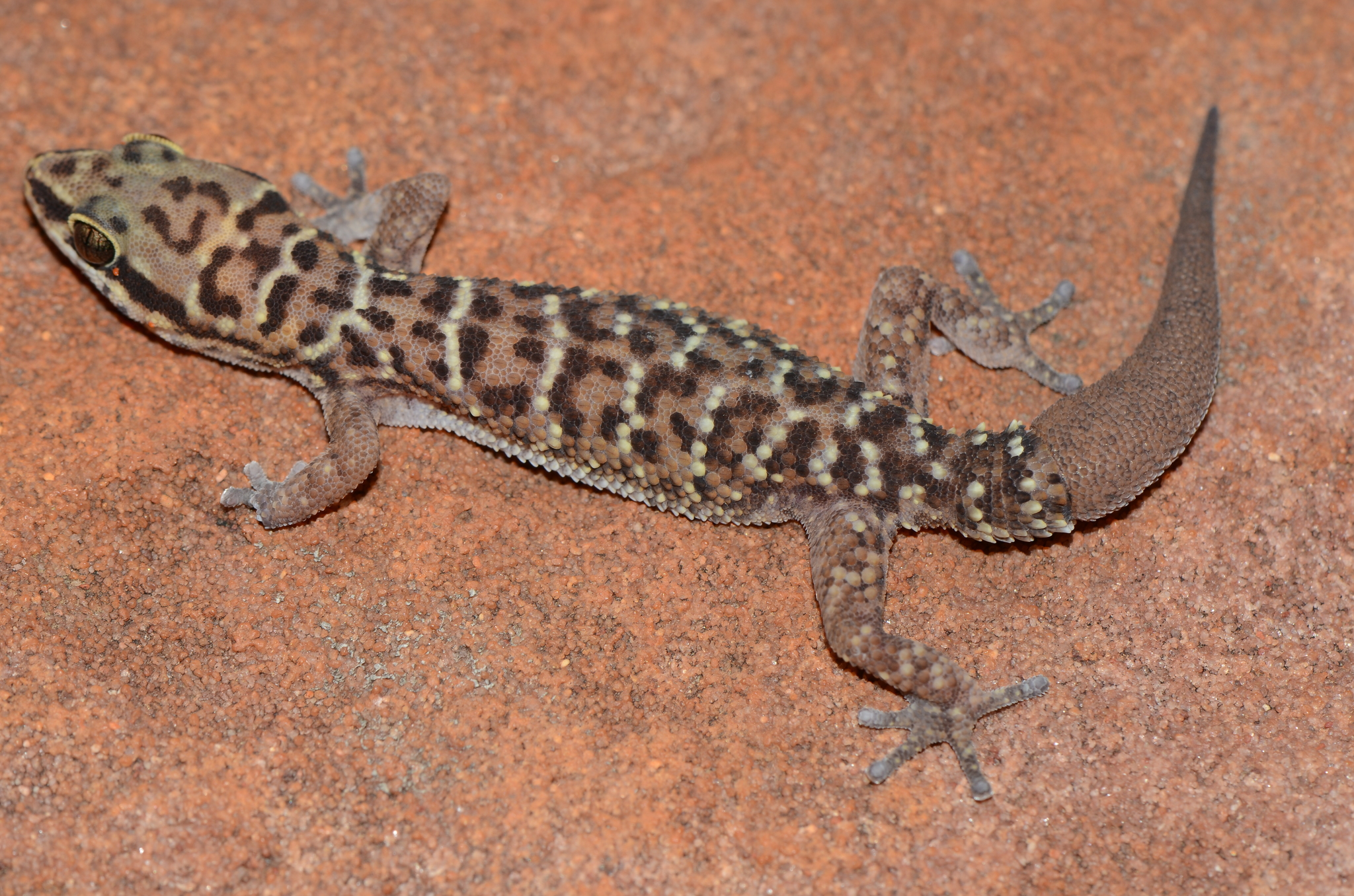

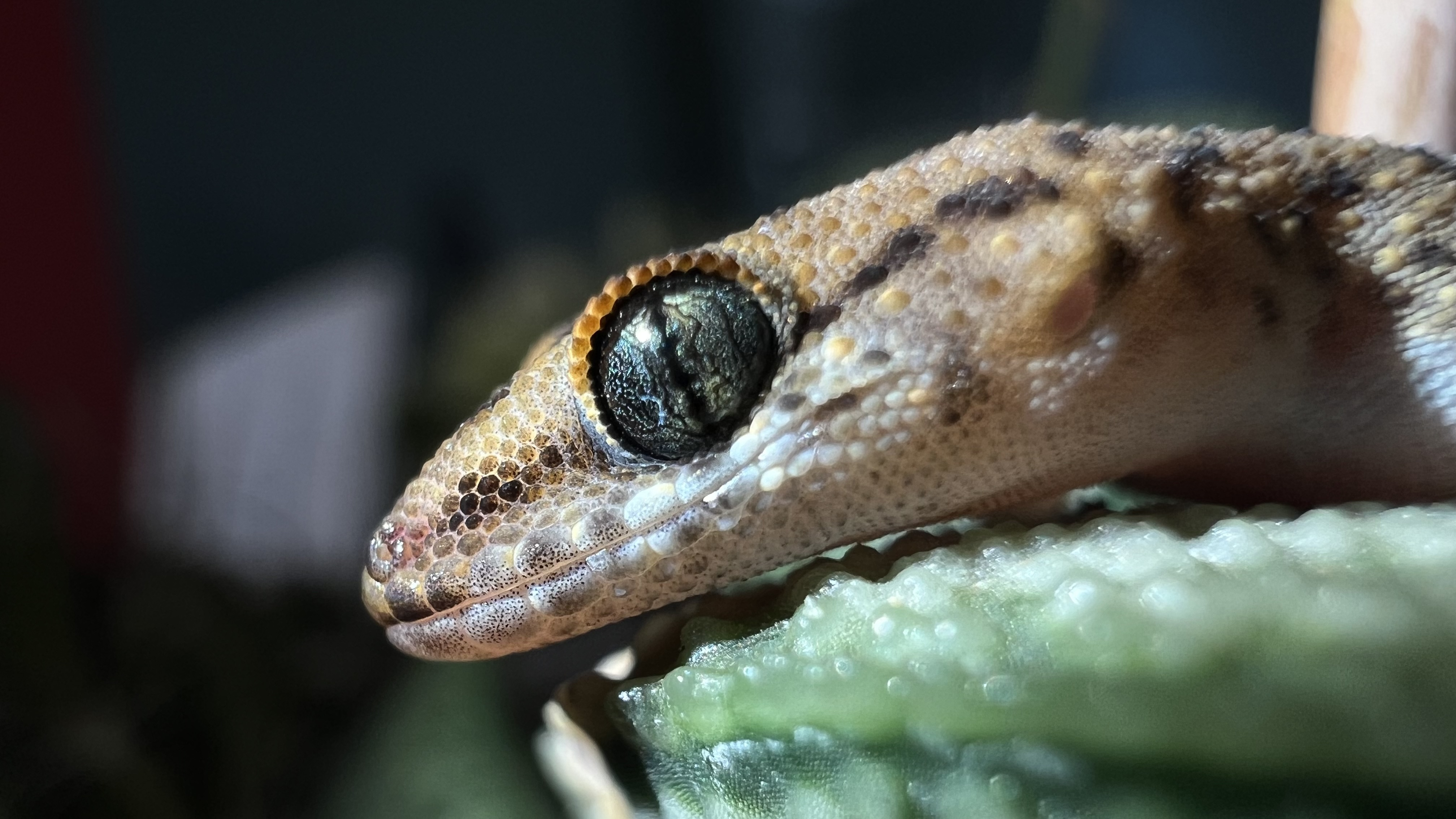
