= Pachydactylus sansteynae =

Conservation status
- Least Concern (IUCN 3.1)

Scientific classification
- Kingdom: Animalia
- Phylum: Chordata
- Class: Reptilia
- Order: Squamata
- Suborder: Gekkota
- Family: Gekkonidae
- Genus: Pachydactylus
- Species: P. sansteynae

Binomial name
- Pachydactylus sansteynae Steyn & J. Mitchell, 1967

Synonyms
- Pachydactylus serval sansteyni Steyn & J. Mitchell, 1967; Pachydactylus sansteyni — Kluge, 1993; Pachydactylus sansteynae — Michels & Bauer, 2004

Species of lizard

Pachydactylus sansteynae, also known commonly as the coastal thick-toed gecko or San Steyn's gecko, is a species of lizard in the family Gekkonidae. The species is endemic to Namibia.

== Etymology ==
The specific name, sansteynae, is in honor of San Steyn who is the wife of the senior taxon authority.

== Reproduction ==
P. sansteynae is oviparous.
