= Quartz gecko =

Scientific classification
- Kingdom: Animalia
- Phylum: Chordata
- Class: Reptilia
- Order: Squamata
- Suborder: Gekkota
- Family: Gekkonidae
- Genus: Pachydactylus
- Species: P. latirostris

Binomial name
- Pachydactylus latirostris Hewitt, 1923

Synonyms
- Pachydactylus mariquensis latirostris

Species of lizard

The quartz gecko (Pachydactylus latirostris) is a species of lizard in the family Gekkonidae. It is found in southwestern Africa.
