= Angola banded thick-toed gecko =

Conservation status
- Least Concern (IUCN 3.1)

Scientific classification
- Kingdom: Animalia
- Phylum: Chordata
- Class: Reptilia
- Order: Squamata
- Suborder: Gekkota
- Family: Gekkonidae
- Genus: Pachydactylus
- Species: P. caraculicus

Binomial name
- Pachydactylus caraculicus FitzSimons, 1959

Species of lizard

The Angola banded thick-toed gecko (Pachydactylus caraculicus) is a species of lizard in the family Gekkonidae. It is found in southwestern Angola and northern Namibia.
