= Golden spotted thick-toed gecko =

Conservation status
- Least Concern (IUCN 3.1)

Scientific classification
- Kingdom: Animalia
- Phylum: Chordata
- Class: Reptilia
- Order: Squamata
- Suborder: Gekkota
- Family: Gekkonidae
- Genus: Pachydactylus
- Species: P. oculatus

Binomial name
- Pachydactylus oculatus Hewitt, 1927

Species of lizard

The golden spotted thick-toed gecko (Pachydactylus oculatus) is a species of lizard in the family Gekkonidae. It is endemic to South Africa.
