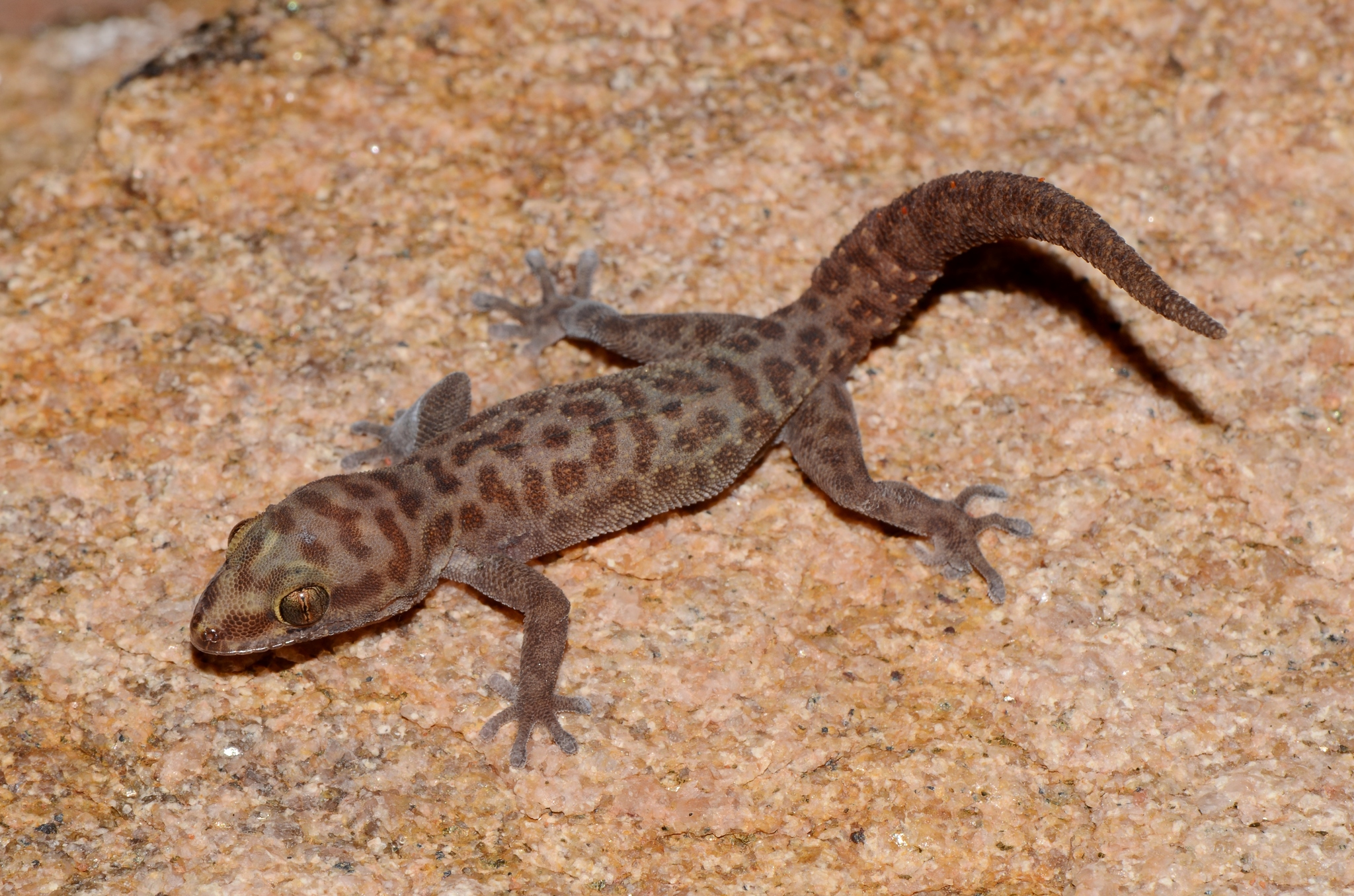

Conservation status
- Least Concern (IUCN 3.1)

Scientific classification
- Kingdom: Animalia
- Phylum: Chordata
- Class: Reptilia
- Order: Squamata
- Suborder: Gekkota
- Family: Gekkonidae
- Genus: Pachydactylus
- Species: P. montanus

Binomial name
- Pachydactylus montanus Methuen & Hewitt, 1914

= Montane thick-toed gecko =

Species of lizard

The montane thick-toed gecko (Pachydactylus montanus) is a species of lizard in the family Gekkonidae. It is found in Namibia and South Africa.
