= Pachydactylus labialis =

Conservation status
- Least Concern (IUCN 3.1)

Scientific classification
- Kingdom: Animalia
- Phylum: Chordata
- Class: Reptilia
- Order: Squamata
- Suborder: Gekkota
- Family: Gekkonidae
- Genus: Pachydactylus
- Species: P. labialis

Binomial name
- Pachydactylus labialis V. FitzSimons, 1938
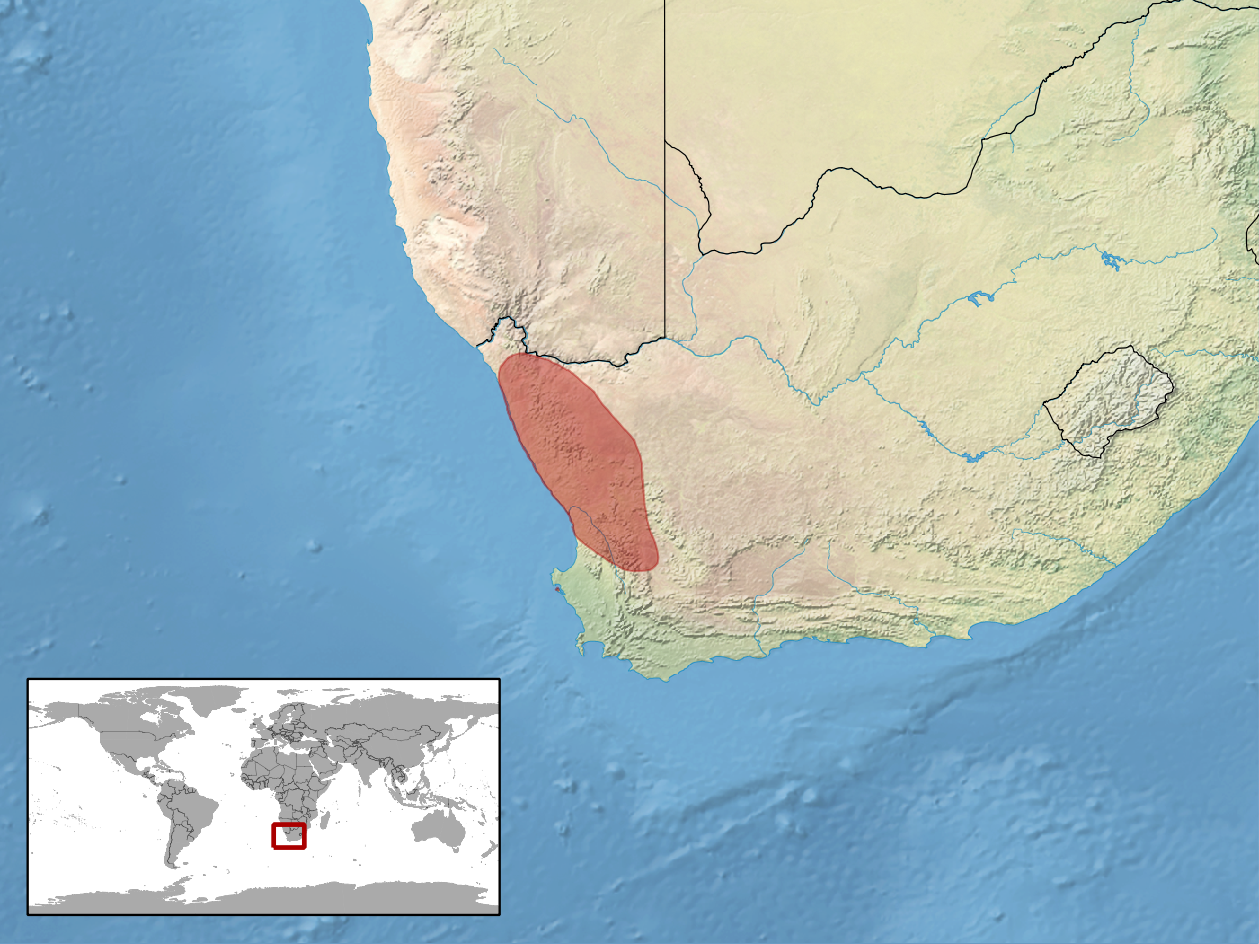

Synonyms
- Pachydactylus capensis labialis V. FitzSimons, 1938; Pachydactylus labialis — Kluge, 1993

Species of lizard

Pachydactylus labialis, commonly known as the Calvinia thick-toed gecko, Western Cape gecko, or Western Cape thick-toed gecko, is a gecko species endemic to the Western and Northern Cape in South Africa, often found taking shelter under stones.

== Geographic range ==
P. labialis is endemic to the arid western parts of South Africa. One common name refers to the town of Calvinia in the Namakwaland.

== Description ==
P. labialis has a body length (snout-vent length or SVL) of about 44 mm (1.7 in) with a tail that is a further 38 mm (1.5 in) in length. The head has a shorter snout than Pachydactylus capensis and is slightly narrower at 7.5 mm (0.30 in).

From above it is greyish brown with irregular dark markings and lighter spots arranged in stripes over the back.

The head is about 10 mm (0.39 in) in length and has a dark band running from the lower part of the eye to above the ear, while a paler stripe runs from the tip of the snout above the eye's dark streak. The labial scales (on the mouth) are dark brown and creamy white, giving the appearance of striped lips.

The original tail has dark brown to blackish crossbars, but regenerated tails are more spotted.

== See also ==
- Snake scales
