= Pachydactylus waterbergensis =

Conservation status
- Least Concern (IUCN 3.1)

Scientific classification
- Kingdom: Animalia
- Phylum: Chordata
- Class: Reptilia
- Order: Squamata
- Suborder: Gekkota
- Family: Gekkonidae
- Genus: Pachydactylus
- Species: P. waterbergensis

Binomial name
- Pachydactylus waterbergensis Bauer & Lamb, 2003

Species of lizard

Pachydactylus waterbergensis is a species of lizard in the family Gekkonidae. It is endemic to Namibia.
