= Pachydactylus kobosensis =

Conservation status
- Least Concern (IUCN 3.1)

Scientific classification
- Kingdom: Animalia
- Phylum: Chordata
- Order: Squamata
- Suborder: Gekkota
- Family: Gekkonidae
- Genus: Pachydactylus
- Species: P. kobosensis

Binomial name
- Pachydactylus kobosensis Fitzsimons, 1938

Species of lizard

Pachydactylus kobosensis is a species of lizard in the family Gekkonidae. It is endemic to Namibia.
