= Pachydactylus fasciatus =

Conservation status
- Least Concern (IUCN 3.1)

Scientific classification
- Kingdom: Animalia
- Phylum: Chordata
- Class: Reptilia
- Order: Squamata
- Suborder: Gekkota
- Family: Gekkonidae
- Genus: Pachydactylus
- Species: P. fasciatus

Binomial name
- Pachydactylus fasciatus Boulenger, 1888
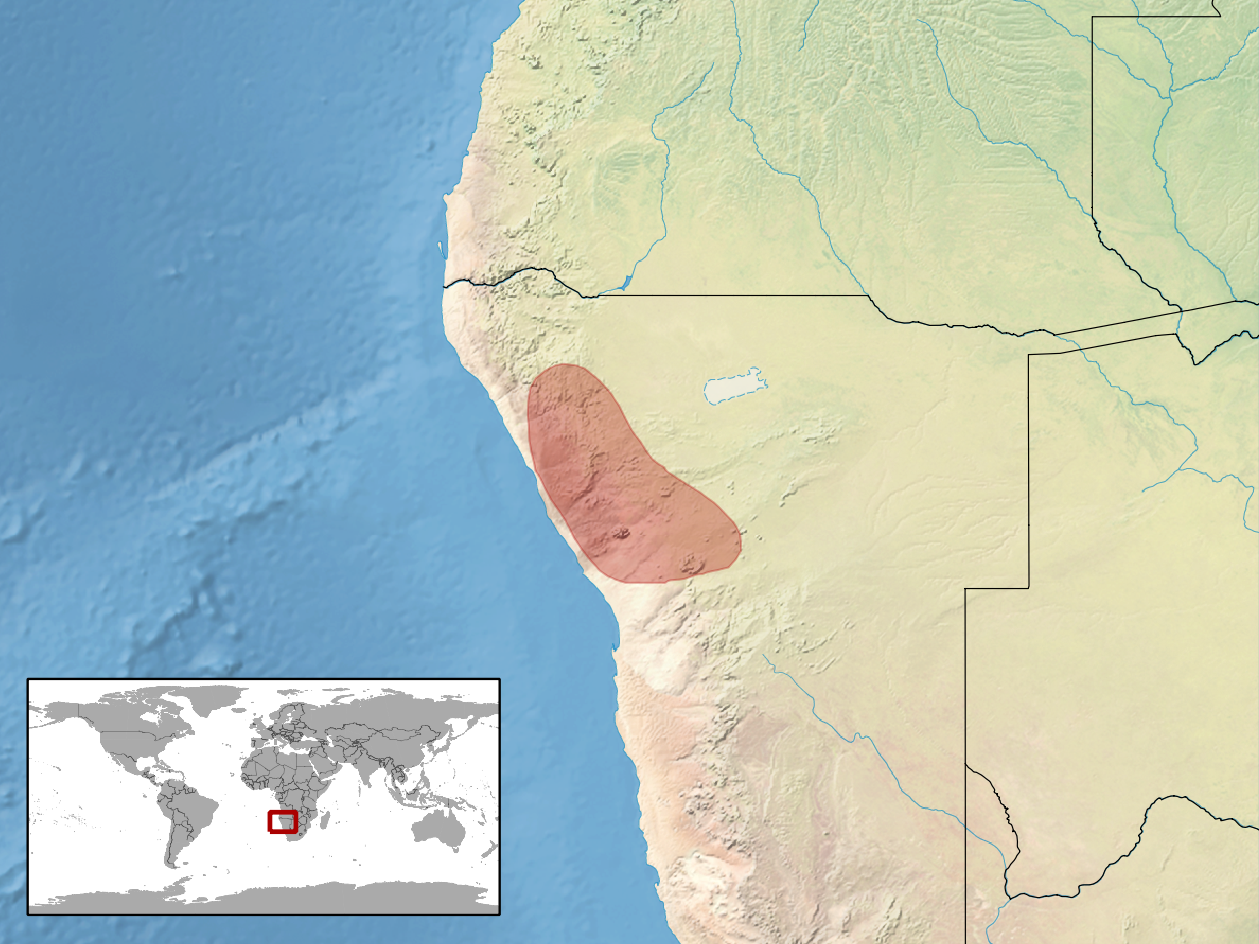

Species of lizard

Pachydactylus fasciatus, also known as the striped thick-toed gecko, banded thick-toed gecko, thick-toed banded gecko, or Damaraland banded gecko, is a species of lizard in the family Gekkonidae. It is endemic to northwestern Namibia.

Thick-Toed Banded Geckos are beige or light brown—sometimes purplish— with brown, orange, or yellow stripes. Their underside is pale, pinkish, and slightly translucent. Their body as juveniles is lighter in color, more yellow, with their banding being darker and more prominent. Their entire body is covered with tubercle scales, giving them a characteristic bumpy look. Their eyes are typically a shade of orange or amber. They are occasionally kept as pets, and are particularly attractive due to their small size and hardiness.
