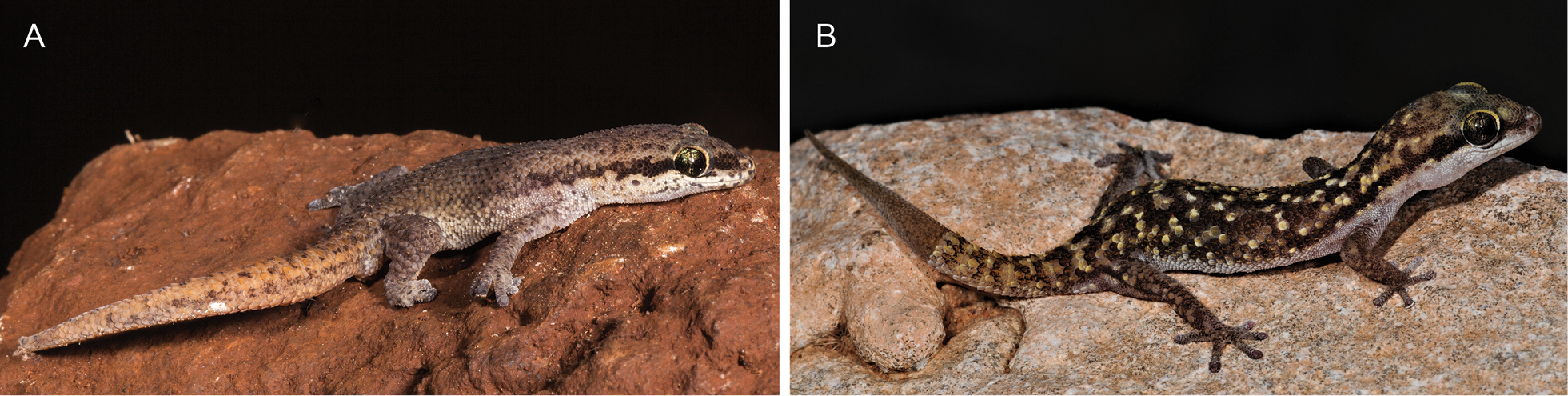

Conservation status
- Least Concern (IUCN 3.1)

Scientific classification
- Kingdom: Animalia
- Phylum: Chordata
- Class: Reptilia
- Order: Squamata
- Suborder: Gekkota
- Family: Gekkonidae
- Genus: Pachydactylus
- Species: P. angolensis

Binomial name
- Pachydactylus angolensis Loveridge, 1944

Synonyms
- Pachydactylus scutatus angolensis

= Pachydactylus angolensis =

Species of lizard

Pachydactylus angolensis, the Angola large-scaled gecko or Angolan thicktoed gecko, is a species of lizard in the family Gekkonidae. It is found in Angola.
