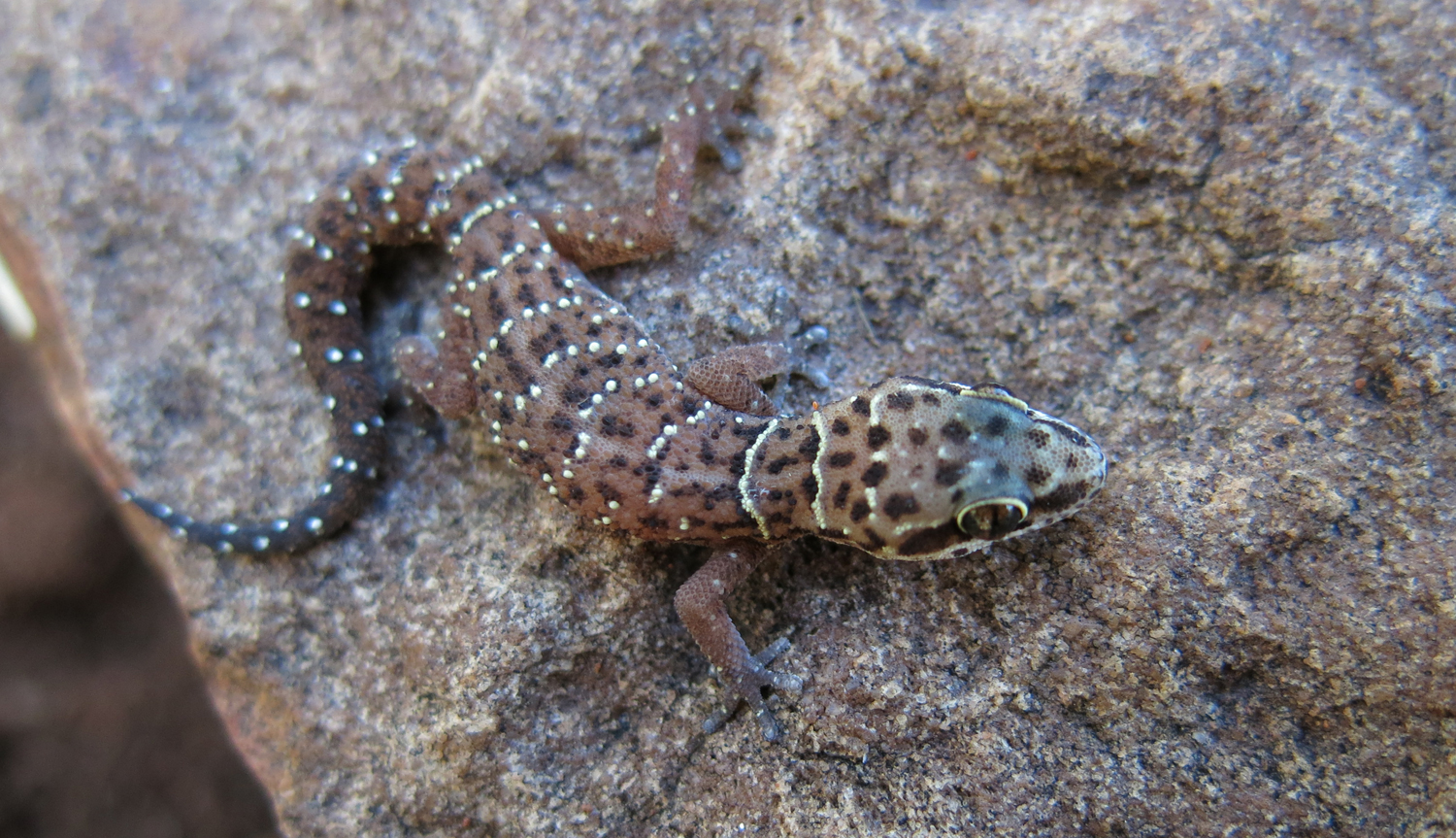
- In the Soutpansberg, South Africa

Conservation status
- Least Concern (IUCN 3.1)

Scientific classification
- Kingdom: Animalia
- Phylum: Chordata
- Class: Reptilia
- Order: Squamata
- Suborder: Gekkota
- Family: Gekkonidae
- Genus: Pachydactylus
- Species: P. vansoni

Binomial name
- Pachydactylus vansoni V. FitzSimons,1933
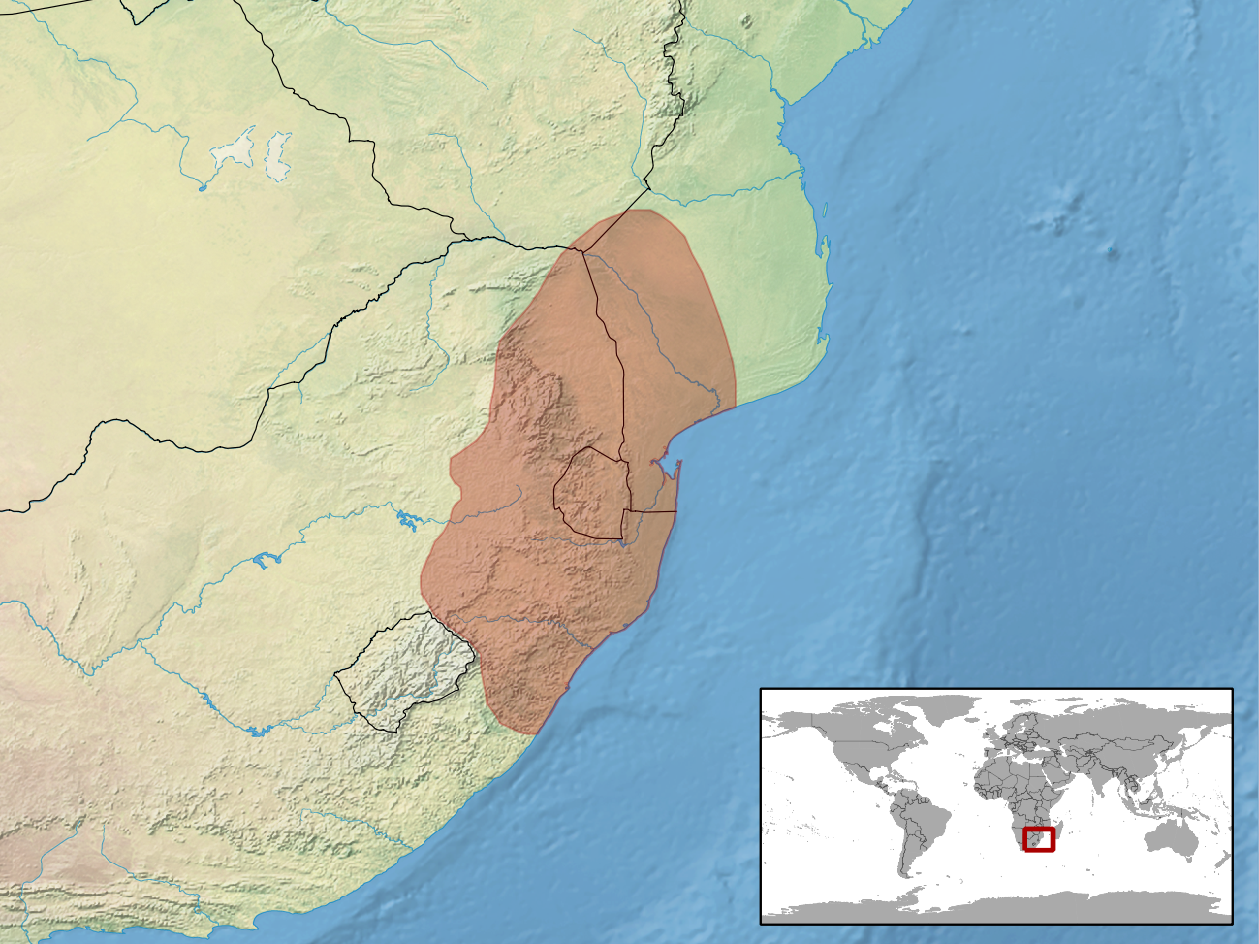
- range

Synonyms
- Pachydactylus capensis vansoni V. Fitzsimons 1933; Pachtdactylus vansoni — Bauer & Good, 1996

= Pachydactylus vansoni =

Van Son's thick-toed gecko

Species of lizard

Pachydactylus vansoni, commonly known as Van Son's gecko or Van Son's thick-toed gecko, is a species of lizard in the family Gekkonidae. The species is endemic to Southern Africa.

== Etymology ==
The specific name, vansoni, is in honor of Russian-born Dutch entomologist Georges Van Son (1898-1967), who worked at the Transvaal Museum (1925-1967).

== Geographic range ==
P. vansoni is distributed in Lesotho, Mozambique, South Africa, Eswatini, and Zimbabwe. The geographic range of this species is estimated to be larger than 100,000 km^{2} (38,610 sq mi).

== Habitat ==
The preferred natural habitats of P. vansoni are grassland and savanna, at altitudes from sea level to 2,300 m (7,500 ft).

== Reproduction ==
P. vansoni is oviparous.
