= Tsodilo thick-toed gecko =

Conservation status
- Least Concern (IUCN 3.1)

Scientific classification
- Kingdom: Animalia
- Phylum: Chordata
- Class: Reptilia
- Order: Squamata
- Suborder: Gekkota
- Family: Gekkonidae
- Genus: Pachydactylus
- Species: P. tsodiloensis

Binomial name
- Pachydactylus tsodiloensis Haacke, 1966

Species of lizard

The Tsodilo thick-toed gecko (Pachydactylus tsodiloensis) is a species of lizard in the family Gekkonidae. It is endemic to Botswana.
