= Cape Cross thick-toed gecko =

Conservation status
- Least Concern (IUCN 3.1)

Scientific classification
- Kingdom: Animalia
- Phylum: Chordata
- Order: Squamata
- Suborder: Gekkota
- Family: Gekkonidae
- Genus: Pachydactylus
- Species: P. kochii

Binomial name
- Pachydactylus kochii (V. FitzSimons, 1959)

Synonyms
- Pachydactylus kochii V. FitzSimons, 1959; Colopus kochi — Bauer & Lamb, 2005

Species of gecko

The Cape Cross thick-toed gecko (Pachydactylus kochii), also known commonly as Koch's gecko and Koch's thick-toed gecko, is a species of lizard in the family Gekkonidae. The species is endemic to southern Africa.

== Etymology ==
The specific name, kochii, is in honor of Austrian-born South African entomologist Charles Koch.

== Geographic range ==
P. kochii is found in Namibia and in South Africa (southern Namaqualand).

== Habitat ==
The preferred natural habitats of P. kochii are desert and savanna, at altitudes of 10–800 m (33–2,625 ft).

== Description ==
Adults of P. kochii have a snout-to-vent length (SVL) of 4–5 cm (1.6–2.0 in). The body is slender. Dorsally, the ground color is grayish with a lavender tinge, and there are five reddish-brown crossbands. Ventrally it is white.

== Behavior ==
P. kochii is terrestrial. It shelters in burrows dug by other animals.

== Reproduction ==
P. kochii is oviparous.
