= Purcell's gecko =

Scientific classification
- Kingdom: Animalia
- Phylum: Chordata
- Class: Reptilia
- Order: Squamata
- Suborder: Gekkota
- Family: Gekkonidae
- Genus: Pachydactylus
- Species: P. purcelli

Binomial name
- Pachydactylus purcelli Boulenger, 1910

Species of lizard

Purcell's gecko (Pachydactylus purcelli) is a species of lizard in the family Gekkonidae. The species is endemic to southern Africa.

== Etymology ==
The specific name, purcelli, is in honor of South African entomologist William Frederick Purcell.

== Geographic range ==
P. purcelli is found in Namibia and South Africa.

== Reproduction ==
P. purcelli is oviparous.
