= Pachydactylus rugosus =

Conservation status
- Least Concern (IUCN 3.1)

Scientific classification
- Kingdom: Animalia
- Phylum: Chordata
- Class: Reptilia
- Order: Squamata
- Suborder: Gekkota
- Family: Gekkonidae
- Genus: Pachydactylus
- Species: P. rugosus

Binomial name
- Pachydactylus rugosus Smith, 1849

Species of lizard

Pachydactylus rugosus, also known as the common rough gecko, wrinkled thick-toed gecko, rough thick-toed gecko, or rough-scaled gecko, is a species of lizard in the family Gekkonidae. It is found in South Africa, Namibia, and Botswana.
