= Tiger thick-toed gecko =

Scientific classification
- Domain: Eukaryota
- Kingdom: Animalia
- Phylum: Chordata
- Class: Reptilia
- Order: Squamata
- Infraorder: Gekkota
- Family: Gekkonidae
- Genus: Pachydactylus
- Species: P. tigrinus

Binomial name
- Pachydactylus tigrinus Van Dam, 1921

Species of lizard

The tiger thick-toed gecko (Pachydactylus tigrinus) is a species of lizard in the family Gekkonidae. It is found in Zimbabwe, South Africa, Botswana, and Mozambique.
