= Katanga thick-toed gecko =

Conservation status
- Least Concern (IUCN 3.1)

Scientific classification
- Kingdom: Animalia
- Phylum: Chordata
- Class: Reptilia
- Order: Squamata
- Suborder: Gekkota
- Family: Gekkonidae
- Genus: Pachydactylus
- Species: P. katanganus

Binomial name
- Pachydactylus katanganus De Witte, 1953

Synonyms
- Pachydactylus capensis katanganus Pachydactylus oshaughnessyi katanganus

Species of lizard

The Katanga thick-toed gecko (Pachydactylus katanganus) is a species of lizard in the family Gekkonidae.

== Distribution ==
It is found in the Republic of the Congo and Malawi.
