= Pachydactylus maiatoi =

Scientific classification
- Kingdom: Animalia
- Phylum: Chordata
- Class: Reptilia
- Order: Squamata
- Suborder: Gekkota
- Family: Gekkonidae
- Genus: Pachydactylus
- Species: P. maiatoi

Binomial name
- Pachydactylus maiatoi Marques, Parrhina, Ceríaco, Brennan, Heinicke, & Bauer, 2023

Species of lizard

Maiato's thick-toed gecko (Pachydactylus maiatoi) is a species of lizard in the family Gekkonidae. It is endemic to Angola.
