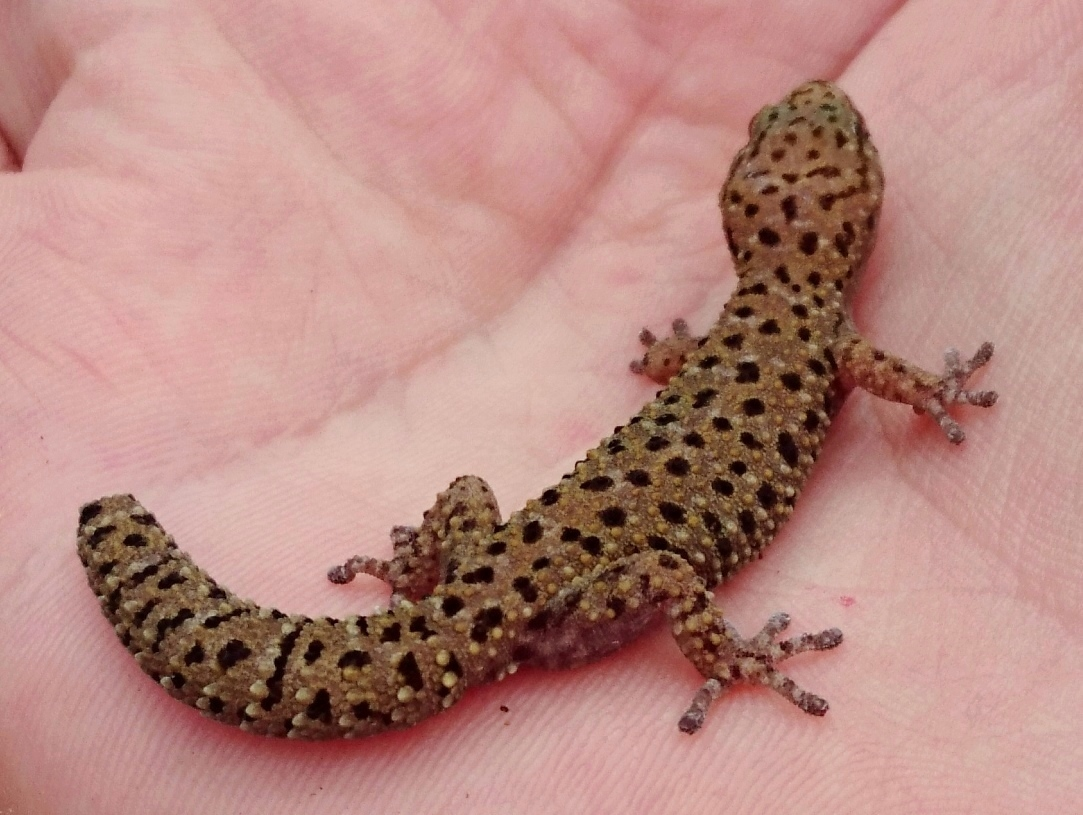

Scientific classification
- Kingdom: Animalia
- Phylum: Chordata
- Class: Reptilia
- Order: Squamata
- Suborder: Gekkota
- Family: Gekkonidae
- Genus: Pachydactylus
- Species: P. capensis

Binomial name
- Pachydactylus capensis (Smith, 1846)

Synonyms
- Tarentola capensis Smith, 1846; Pachydactylus elegans Gray, 1845; Pachydactylus obscurus Thominot, 1889; Pachydactylus tessellatus Werner, 1910; Pachydactylus leopardinus Sternfeld, 1911; Pachydactylus mentalis

= Pachydactylus capensis =

Cape thick-toed gecko

Species of lizard

Pachydactylus capensis, also known as Cape gecko or Cape thick-toed gecko, is a species of lizard in the family Gekkonidae. It is found in southern Africa.
