= Scelotes limpopoensis =

Limpopo burrowing skink

Scientific classification
- Domain: Eukaryota
- Kingdom: Animalia
- Phylum: Chordata
- Class: Reptilia
- Order: Squamata
- Family: Scincidae
- Genus: Scelotes
- Species: S. limpopoensis

Binomial name
- Scelotes limpopoensis FitzSimons 1930

Species of lizard

The Limpopo burrowing skink (Scelotes limpopoensis) is a lizard species found in the Limpopo River valley in South Africa.

This species lost the forelimbs entirely and the hind limbs are reduced to only two digits.

== Taxonomy ==
There are two sub-species:

- Scelotes limpopoensis albiventris JACOBSEN 1987 - first described in the Langjan Nature Reserve
- Scelotes limpopoensis limpopoensis FITZSIMONS 1930

Although both sub-species occupy a similar habitat the range of S. l. albiventris is smaller than S. l. limpopoensis and they have not been discovered in sympatry, and may probably be a full species.
