= Pachydactylus scutatus =

Conservation status
- Least Concern (IUCN 3.1)

Scientific classification
- Kingdom: Animalia
- Phylum: Chordata
- Class: Reptilia
- Order: Squamata
- Suborder: Gekkota
- Family: Gekkonidae
- Genus: Pachydactylus
- Species: P. scutatus

Binomial name
- Pachydactylus scutatus Hewitt, 1927

Species of lizard

Pachydactylus scutatus, also known as the large-scaled gecko or shielded thick-toed gecko, is a species of lizard in the family Gekkonidae. It is found in Namibia, South Africa, and Angola.
