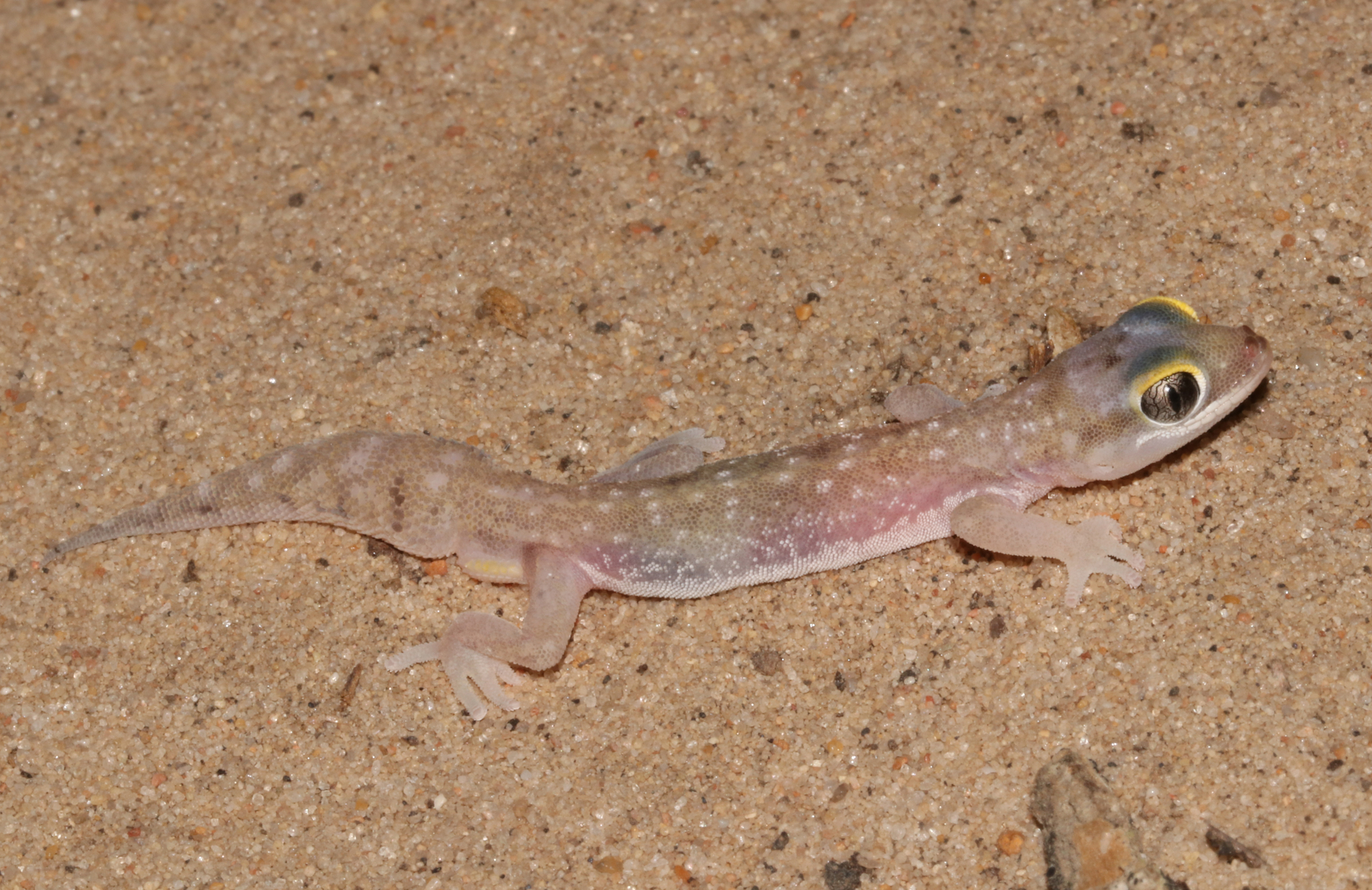

Conservation status
- Least Concern (IUCN 3.1)

Scientific classification
- Kingdom: Animalia
- Phylum: Chordata
- Class: Reptilia
- Order: Squamata
- Suborder: Gekkota
- Family: Gekkonidae
- Genus: Pachydactylus
- Species: P. austeni

Binomial name
- Pachydactylus austeni Hewitt, 1923

= Pachydactylus austeni =

Species of lizard

Pachydactylus austeni, also known commonly as Austen's thick-toed gecko or Austen's gecko, is a species of small thick-toed gecko, a lizard in the family Gekkonidae. The species is indigenous to the western coast of South Africa.

== Etymology ==
The specific name, austeni, is in honour of English topographer Henry Haversham Godwin-Austen.

== Habitat, behaviour and diet ==
The natural habitat of P. austeni is coastal dunes and alluvial sands, at elevations up to 600 m (2,000 ft). It lives in a tiny burrow that it digs in the sand, and it leaves its burrow at night to forage for small insects among the dune vegetation.

== Description ==
P. austeni has a smooth, colourful body with large eyes and conspicuous yellow or white eyelids.

== Reproduction ==
P. austeni is oviparous.
