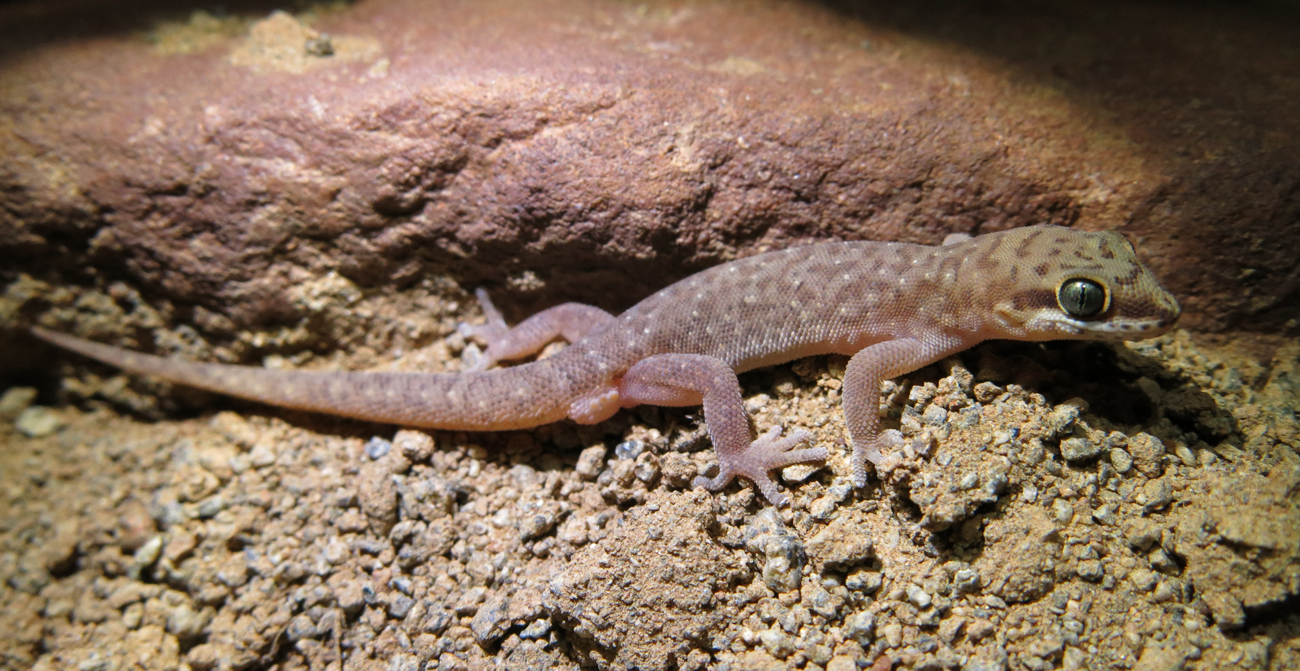

Scientific classification
- Kingdom: Animalia
- Phylum: Chordata
- Class: Reptilia
- Order: Squamata
- Suborder: Gekkota
- Family: Gekkonidae
- Genus: Pachydactylus
- Species: P. punctatus

Binomial name
- Pachydactylus punctatus Peters, 1854

= Pachydactylus punctatus =

Species of lizard

Pachydactylus punctatus, also known as the pointed thick-toed gecko or speckled thick-toed gecko, is a species of lizard in the family Gekkonidae. It is found in southern Africa (South Africa, Namibia, Botswana, Zimbabwe, Mozambique, Angola, Zambia, and southern Democratic Republic of the Congo).

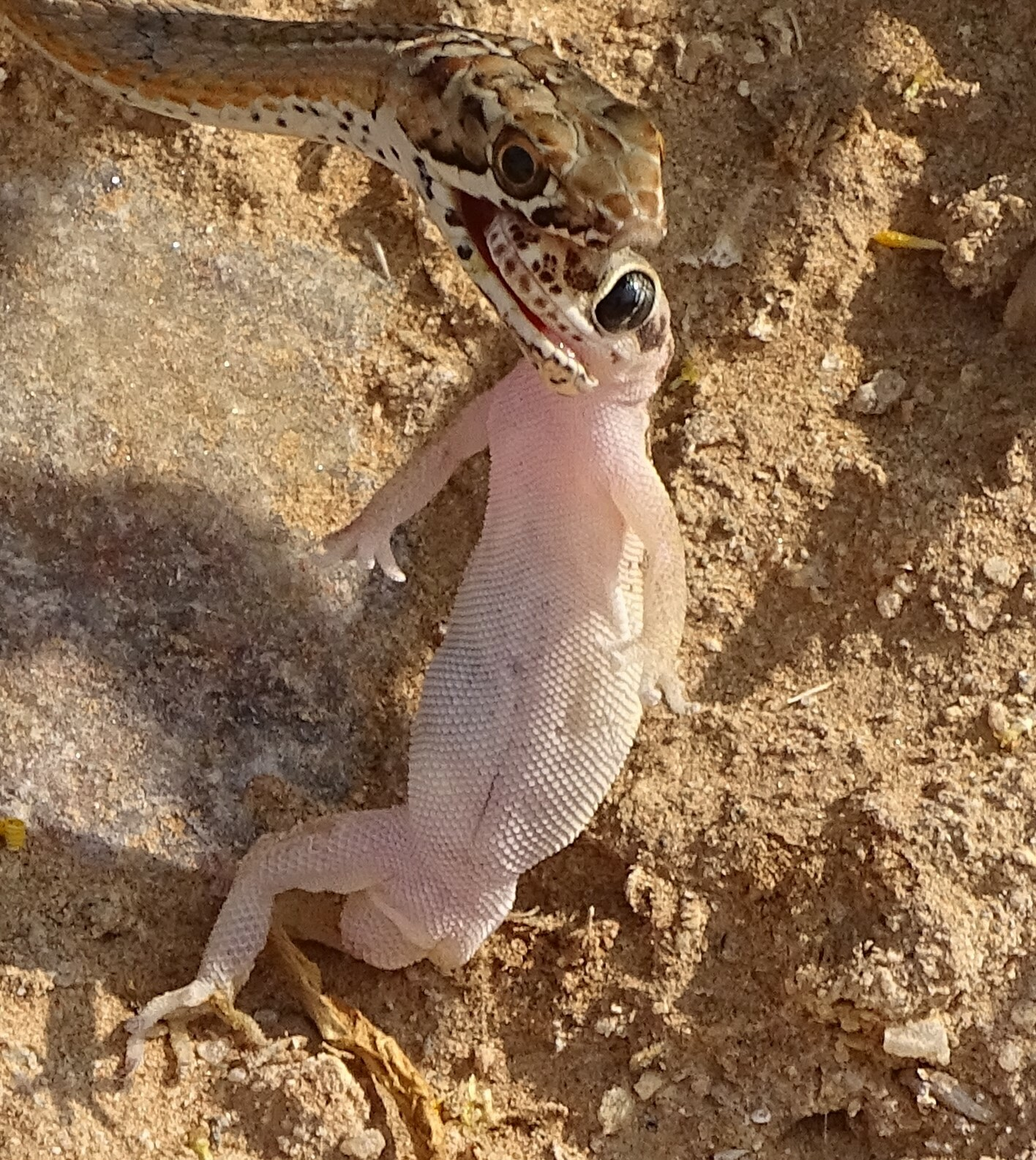
Being eaten by a Karoo sand snake
