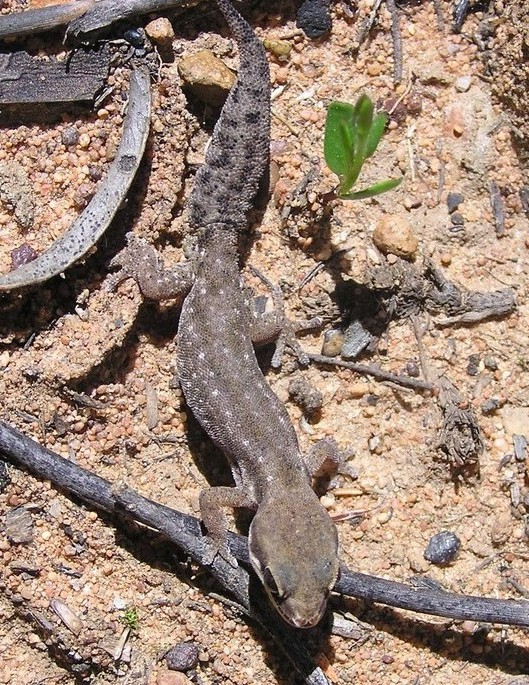

Conservation status
- Least Concern (IUCN 3.1)

Scientific classification
- Kingdom: Animalia
- Phylum: Chordata
- Class: Reptilia
- Order: Squamata
- Suborder: Gekkota
- Family: Gekkonidae
- Genus: Pachydactylus
- Species: P. geitje

Binomial name
- Pachydactylus geitje (Sparrman, 1778)

Synonyms
- Lacerta geitje Sparrman, 1778; Gecko ocellatus Cuvier, 1817; Pachydactylus ocellatus — Boulenger, 1885; Pachydactylus monticolus V. FitzSimons, 1943; Pachydactylus geitje — Loveridge, 1947

= Pachydactylus geitje =

Species of lizard

Pachydactylus geitje, also known commonly as the ocellated gecko, the ocellated thick-toed gecko and the Cradock thick-toed gecko, is a tiny species of thick-toed gecko, a lizard in the family Gekkonidae. The species is indigenous to the Western Cape of South Africa.

== Description ==
P. geitje is a very colourful, mottled little gecko. Its smooth (almost silky) body is usually covered in dark-edged white spots.

== Habitat ==
P. geitje typically lives on the ground among debris and under rocks. Further inland it only lives higher in the mountains where rocky outcrops provide it with sufficient places to hide.

== Reproduction ==
Pachydactylus geitje lays a clutch of two tiny eggs in the summer.
