= Weber's thick-toed gecko =

Conservation status
- Least Concern (IUCN 3.1)

Scientific classification
- Kingdom: Animalia
- Phylum: Chordata
- Class: Reptilia
- Order: Squamata
- Suborder: Gekkota
- Family: Gekkonidae
- Genus: Pachydactylus
- Species: P. weberi

Binomial name
- Pachydactylus weberi Roux, 1907

Species of lizard

Weber's thick-toed gecko (Pachydactylus weberi) is a species of lizard in the family Gekkonidae. The species is native to southern Africa.

== Etymology ==
The specific name, weberi, is in honor of German-Dutch zoologist Max Wilhelm Carl Weber van Bosse.

== Geographic range ==
P. weberi is found in Namibia and South Africa.

== Habitat ==
The preferred natural habitats of P. weberi are desert and shrubland, at altitudes from sea level to 1,500 m (4,900 ft).

== Description ==
P. weberi is small for its genus, flattened, and slender-bodied. Adults have a snout-to-vent length (SVL) of 3.5–4.5 cm (1.4–1.8 in). The maximum recorded SVL is 5 cm (2.0 in).

== Behavior ==
P. weberi is nocturnal. During the day it shelters in rock crevices.

== Diet ==
P. weberi predominantly preys upon moths and spiders.

== Reproduction ==
P. weberi is oviparous. The adult female lays a clutch of two hard-shelled eggs. Each egg measures on average 9.5 mm x 6.5 mm (0.37 in x 0.26 in).
