= Vivian Frederick Maynard FitzSimons =

South African herpetologist (1901–1975)

- Born: 7 February 1901; Pietermaritzburg, Colony of Natal
- Died: 1 August 1975 (aged 74); Pretoria, South Africa
- Education: Rhodes University
- Scientific career
- Fields: Herpetology, Plant collector
- Workplaces: Transvaal Museum, Namib Desert Research Station

Vivian Frederick Maynard FitzSimons, born in Pietermaritzburg, was a notable herpetologist in South Africa. Also, he contributed to the collection of spermatophyte samples for the National Herbarium which has become part of the South African National Biodiversity Institute at the Pretoria National Botanical Garden. In 1937, together with Anna Amelia Obermeyer, he collected some of the earliest plant specimens from the Eastern Highlands of Rhodesia (now Zimbabwe).

Later, as director of the Transvaal Museum, he together with Charles Koch helped to establish the Namib Desert Research Institute in Gobabeb

== Family ==
Vivian FitzSimons came from a family of naturalists. His father, Frederick William FitzSimons, and his mother Patricia Henrietta (née Russell), both immigrated to South Africa from Ireland.

His brother was Desmond Charles Fitzsimons, who in 1939 founded the Fitzsimons Snake Park (Durban) and was a leading distributor of snake antivenoms in South Africa.

Vivian FitzSimons attended the prestigious Grey High School in Port Elizabeth.

== List of written works ==
Some of his writings include:

- 1932. Preliminary descriptions of new forms of South African Reptilia and Amphibia, from the Vernay-Lang Kalahari Expedition, 1930.
- 1933. Description of five new lizards from the Transvaal and Southern Rhodesia.
- 1938. Transvaal Museum Expedition to South-West Africa and Little Namaqualand, May to August 1937.
- 1939. Descriptions of some new species and subspecies of lizards from South Africa.
- 1941. Descriptions of some new lizards from South Africa and a frog from southern Rhodesia.
- 1943. The lizards of South Africa. (Reprinted 1970).
- 1948. Descriptions of two new frogs from Natal and a gecko from Astove Island.
- 1958. with Charles Kimberlin Brain (1931–). A Short account of the Reptiles of the Kalahari Gemsbok National Park.
- 1959. Some new reptiles from southern Africa and southern Angola.
- 1962. Snakes of Southern Africa.
- 1970. A Field Guide to the Snakes of South Africa.

== Notable posts ==
- Director of the Transvaal Museum 1946 - 1966
- President of the South African Museums Association in 1955

== Species described ==
As a leading herpetologist at the Transvaal Museum, Vivian was involved in the original description of as many as 41 South African reptiles, including the following species.

- 1930. Bradypodion transvaalense – Transvaal dwarf chameleon
- 1930. Afroedura langi
- 1930. Afroedura marleyi – Pondo rock gecko
- 1930. Breviceps sylvestris – forest rain frog
- 1930. Platysaurus minor – Waterberg flat lizard
- 1930. Scelotes bidigittatus – a skink
- 1930. Scelotes limpopoensis – Limpopo burrowing skink
- 1930. Smaug vandami – Van Dam’s girdled lizard
- 1930. Smaug depressus – Zoutpansberg girdled lizard
- 1930. Zygaspis vandami (synonyms: Zygaspis violacea vandami, Amphisbaena vandami )
- 1932. Lygodactylus chobiensis – Chobe dwarf gecko
- 1932. Pelusios bechuanicus – Okavango mud turtle
- 1932. Phrynobatrachus mababiensis – Mababe puddle frog
- 1932. Rhinotyphlops boylei – Boyle's beaked blind snake
- 1932. Xenocalamus bicolor maculatus – slender quill-snouted snake subspecies
- 1933. Pachydactylus vansoni – Van Son's thick-toed gecko
- 1933. Vhembelacerta rupicola – Soutpansberg rock lizard
- 1937. Lygodactylus methueni – Methuen's dwarf gecko
- 1938. Goggia rupicola – Namaqualand dwarf leaf-toed gecko
- 1938. Namazonurus campbelli – Campbell's girdled lizard
- 1938. Pachydactylus kobosensis
- 1938. Pachydactylus labialis – Calvinia thick-toed gecko, Western Cape thick-toed gecko
- 1938. Pachydactylus robertsi – large-scaled gecko, shielded thick-toed gecko
- 1938. Typhlacontias brevipes – FitzSimons' burrowing skink
- 1938. Afroedura namaquensis
- 1939. Goggia microlepidota – small-scaled dwarf leaf-toed gecko
- 1939. Scelotes kasneri – Kasner's dwarf burrowing skink
- 1941. Acontias gariepensis
- 1941. Acontias occidentalis
- 1941. Hyperolius swynnertoni – an African reed frog
- 1941. Pachydactylus acuminatus
- 1941. Platysaurus orientalis – Sekukune flat lizard
- 1943. Pseudocordylus transvaalensis
- 1943. Pachydactylus monticolus = Pachydactylus geitje (Sparrman, 1778)
- 1946. Heleophryne orientalis – eastern ghost frog
- 1946. Xenocalamus bicolor australis– slender quill-snouted snake subspecies
- 1947. Cacosternum striatum – striped caco
- 1947. Pseudocordylus spinosus – prickly girdled lizard, near threatened
- 1947. Anhydrophryne hewitti – Hewitt's moss frog, Natal chirping frog, or yellow bandit frog
- 1957. Rhoptropus biporosus – Kaokoveld Namib day gecko
- 1958. Lygodactylus bernardi – Bernard's dwarf gecko, Arnoult's dwarf gecko
- 1958. Smaug mossambicus – Mozambique girdled lizard
- 1959. Pachydactylus caraculicus – Angolan banded thick-toed gecko
- 1959. Pachydactylus kochii = Colopus kochi (V. FitzSimons, 1959) – Koch's thick-toed gecko
- 1962. Leptotyphlops occidentalis – western thread snake

== Eponyms ==
Vivian FitzSimons is commemorated in the scientific names of four reptiles.

- Chondrodactylus fitzsimonsi
- Elapsoidea sundevallii fitzsimonsi
- Platysaurus orientalis fitzsimonsi
- Scelotes fitzsimonsi

== External Articles ==
- Vhembelacerta rupicola. French language Wikipedia.
- Namazonurus campbelli. French language Wikipedia.
- "Vivian Fitzsimons". South African History Online.
