= William Roy Branch =

British-South African herpetologist (1946–2018)

- Born: 12 May 1946; London, England
- Died: 14 October 2018 (aged 72); Port Elizabeth
- Education: University of Southampton
- Scientific career
- Fields: herpetology
- Author abbrev. (zoology): Branch

William Roy "Bill" Branch (12 May 1946, London, England – 14 October 2018, Port Elizabeth, South Africa) was a British-South-African herpetologist.

Branch studied at the University of Southampton where he remained until completing his Ph.D. degree (Studies on a foetal-specific alpha-globulin [AFP] in the rabbit ). From 1972 he worked as a scientist in the Life Sciences Division of the Atomic Energy Board in Pretoria doing research on, inter alia, liver cancer, but returned to the University of Southampton in 1976 to take up a post-doctoral research fellowship in the Department of Biology studying the synthesis of chemicals in the liver of foetal rabbits.

He started working at Port Elizabeth Museum in 1979 and retired in 2011, when he was appointed as Research Associate and Curator Emeritus. Over a period of almost 40 years he conducted field work in about 20 African countries and played a major role in building up the large reptile and amphibian collections at the Museum.

== Publications ==
Branch authored well over 600 publications (including over 150 major scientific articles in peer-reviewed journals), and described (as primary or co-author) about 50 species and 19 genera of reptiles and amphibians which makes him one of the top-100 alpha-taxonomists in herpetology of all time. His publications included several books and book chapters on reptiles and amphibians, and he was co-editor of the Atlas and Red List of Reptiles of South Africa, Lesotho and Swaziland (2014).

== Honors, achievements and service ==
Branch was also an important figure in the Herpetological Association of Africa. He edited the Association's journal in the 1980s and 1990s, and founded the newsletter (now African Herp News).

A frog species, Breviceps branchi; a lizard species, Acanthocercus branchi; a species of venomous snake, Atractaspis branchi; as well as a genus of lizards, were named after him. He also served on several conference committees, journal editorial committees, co-supervised a number of post-graduate students, examined several university theses, and refereed nearly 200 manuscripts for about 56 different journals.

== Publications ==
- Branch, Bill (2004). Field Guide to Snakes and other Reptiles of Southern Africa. Third Revised edition, Second impression. Sanibel Island, Florida: Ralph Curtis Books. 399 pp. ISBN 0-88359-042-5.

== See also ==
- Category:Taxa named by William Roy Branch
