= List of reptiles of Angola =

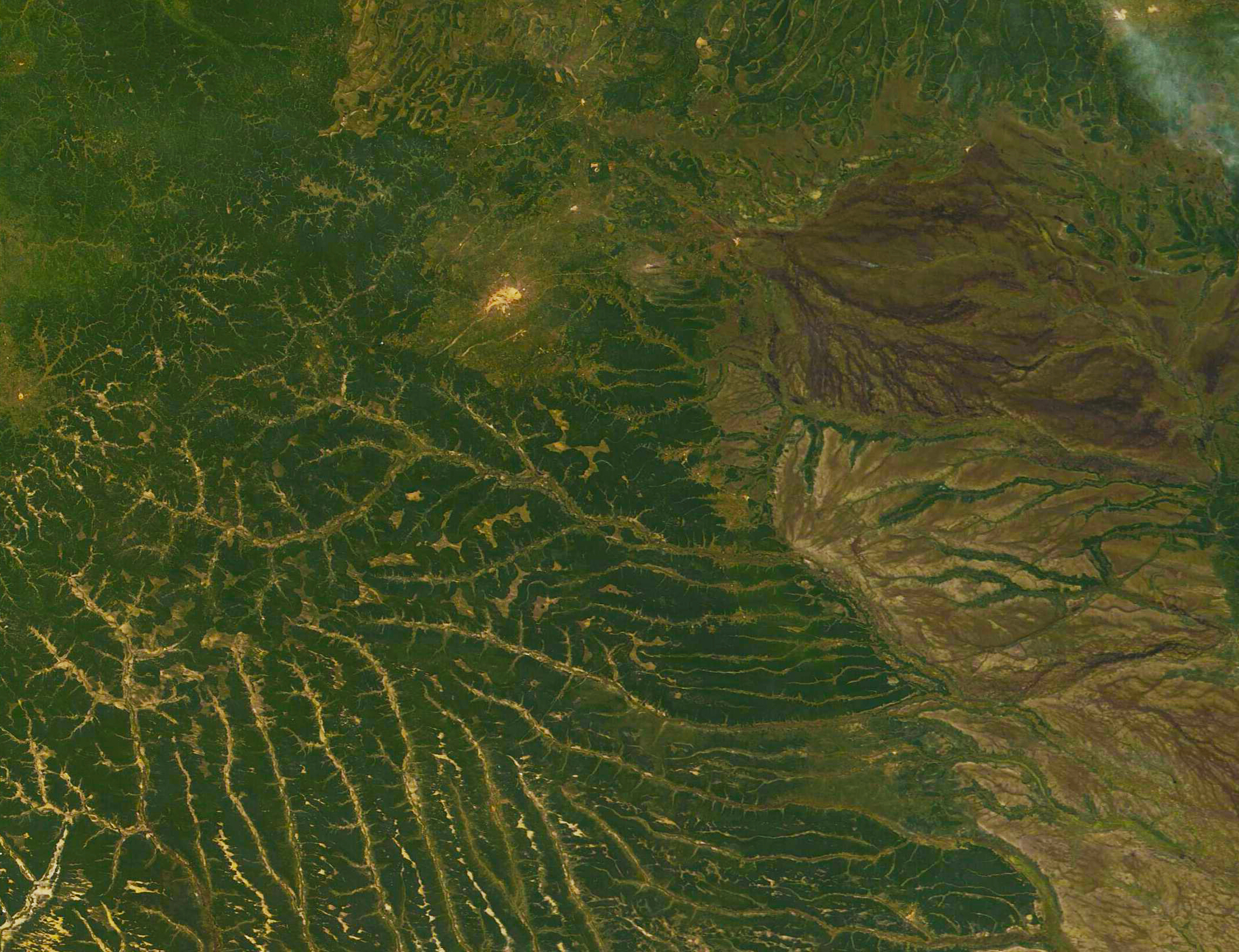
A satellite picture of eastern Angola.

Angola is home to a rich and diverse reptile fauna, with at least 324 species documented according to the Reptile Database (as of 2025). This list includes lizards, snakes, turtles, crocodilians, and amphisbaenians, reflecting the country's varied ecosystems from savannas to rainforests and deserts.

The following is a representative selection of reptile species recorded in Angola. Ratings for global conservation statuses and trends are given by IUCN Red List unless stated otherwise.

== Agamidae (dragons) ==
Common name	Binomial name	Length	Global status	Global trend	Distribution	Image
Ceríaco's tree agama	Acanthocercus ceriacoi	~25 cm (9.8 in)	Data deficient	?	Angola; endemic species, typically inhabiting rocky or arid regions.	
Falk's blue-headed tree agama	Acanthocercus cyanocephalus	~30 cm (12 in)	Least Concern	Steady	Found in East and Central Africa, including Angola; prefers trees and rocky outcrops in savannahs.	
(No common name) Acanthocercus margaritae	Acanthocercus margaritae	~25 cm (9.8 in)	Data deficient	?	Angola and neighboring regions; inhabits semi-arid environments and rocky outcroppings.	
Ground agama	Agama aculeata	~30 cm (12 in)	Least Concern	Steady	Distributed across southern Africa, including Angola; prefers arid and semi-arid grasslands and rocky terrains.	
Common agama	Agama agama	~30 cm (12 in)	Least Concern	Steady	Widespread across sub-Saharan Africa, including Angola; found near human settlements, savannahs, and rocky regions.	
Anchieta's agama	Agama anchietae	~26 cm (10 in)	Least Concern	Steady	Endemic to Angola; inhabits savannahs and rocky outcrops.	
Mucoso agama	Agama mucosoensis	~25 cm (9.8 in)	Least Concern	▲	Angola; poorly known species, likely inhabiting arid or semi-arid environments.	
Namib rock agama	Agama planiceps	~35 cm (14 in)	Least Concern	Steady	Found in southern Africa, including Angola; often seen on rocky outcrops and in arid regions.	

== Amphisbaenidae (worm lizards) ==
Common name	Binomial name	Length	Global status	Global trend	Distribution	Image
(No common name) Dalophia angolensis	Dalophia angolensis	~20 cm (7.9 in)	Least Concern	Steady	Endemic to Angola; fossorial, inhabiting sandy or loose soil habitats in savannahs and dry grasslands.	
(No common name) Dalophia ellenbergeri	Dalophia ellenbergeri	~30 cm (12 in)	Least Concern	Steady	Found in Central Africa, including Angola and Democratic Republic of Congo; inhabits tropical and subtropical dry regions.	
Pestle-tailed worm lizard	Dalophia pistillum	~15 cm (5.9 in)	Least Concern	Steady	Found in Angola and neighboring areas; poorly known species, likely fossorial, inhabiting loose soil or dry habitats.	
(No common name) Dalophia welwitschii	Dalophia welwitschii	~25 cm (9.8 in)	Data deficient	?	Found across southern Africa, including Angola; prefers sandy or loose soils in savannahs and woodlands.	
Anchieta's worm lizard	Monopeltis anchietae	~40 cm (16 in)	Least Concern	Steady	Endemic to Southern Angola; fossorial species found in sandy or arid environments.	
Dusky worm lizard	Monopeltis infuscata	~30 cm (12 in)	Least Concern	Steady	Found in southern and central Angola; fossorial, prefers soft soils in savannah areas.	
(No common name) Monopeltis luandae	Monopeltis luandae	~25 cm (9.8 in)	Least Concern	?	Endemic to Angola; fossorial species likely inhabiting the Luanda region in sandy soils.	
(No common name) Monopeltis perplexus	Monopeltis perplexus	~35 cm (14 in)	Data deficient	?	Restricted to Angola and Zambia; fossorial, prefers loose soils in semi-arid climates.	
Vanderyst worm lizard	Monopeltis vanderysti	~30 cm (12 in)	Least Concern	Steady	Found in Central Africa, including the DRC and northern Angola; fossorial, inhabits savannah and forest edge regions.	

== Chamaeleonidae (chameleons) ==
Common name	Binomial name	Length	Global status	Global trend	Distribution	Image
Double-scaled chameleon	Chamaeleo anchietae	~25 cm (9.8 in)	Least Concern	?	Endemic to Angola; inhabits savannahs, woodlands, and transitional areas. Likely restricted to fragmented habitats.	
Flap-necked chameleon	Chamaeleo dilepis	~35 cm (14 in)	Least Concern	Steady	Widespread across sub-Saharan Africa, including Angola; prefers woodlands, savannahs, and areas with some vegetation cover.	
Graceful chameleon	Chamaeleo gracilis	~40 cm (16 in)	Least Concern	Steady	Found throughout West, Central, and East Africa, with occurrences in Angola. Found in savannahs, forests, and disturbed habitats such as gardens.	
Namaqua chameleon	Chamaeleo namaquensis	~25 cm (9.8 in)	Least Concern	Steady	Found in arid regions of southwestern Africa, including Namibia and Angola; a desert specialist that prefers open sandy or rocky habitats.	
Owen's chameleon	Trioceros oweni	~30 cm (12 in)	Least Concern	?	Occurs in Central and West Africa, including Northern Angola; inhabits forests, dense vegetation, and tropical lowlands.	

== Cordylidae (girdled lizards) ==
Common name	Binomial name	Length	Global status	Global trend	Distribution	Image
Angolan girdled lizard	Cordylus angolensis	~15 cm (5.9 in)	Data deficient	?	Endemic to Angola; found in rocky outcrops in savannah and grassland habitats.	
Machadoe's girdled lizard	Cordylus machadoi	~15 cm (5.9 in)	Near Threatened	?	Endemic to Angola, specifically highland areas; inhabits rocky and mountainous regions.	
Mombolo girdled lizard	Cordylus momboloensis	~15 cm (5.9 in)	Data deficient	?	Endemic to Angola; known from the Mombolo region.	
Kaokoveld girdled lizard	Cordylus namakuiyus	~16 cm (6.3 in)	Least concern	Steady	Restricted to Angola; inhabits rocky areas in the Namakuiyus region.	
N'Dolondolo girdled lizard	Cordylus phonolithos	~15 cm (5.9 in)	Data deficient	?	Endemic to Angola; primarily found on phonolite rock formations.	

== Gekkonidae (geckos) ==
- Afroedura bogerti
- Afroedura donveae
- Afroedura praedicta
- Afroedura pundomontana
- Afroedura vazpintorum
- Afroedura wulfhaackei
- Hemidactylus bayonii
- Hemidactylus benguellensis
- Hemidactylus carivoensis
- Hemidactylus cinganji
- Hemidactylus faustus
- Hemidactylus longicephalus
- Hemidactylus mabouia
- Hemidactylus nzingae
- Hemidactylus paivae
- Hemidactylus pfindaensis
- Hemidactylus vernayi
- Kolekanos plumicaudus
- Kolekanos spinicaudus
- Lygodactylus angolensis
- Lygodactylus baptistai
- Lygodactylus bradfieldi
- Lygodactylus capensis
- Lygodactylus chobiensis
- Lygodactylus lawrencei
- Lygodactylus nyaneka
- Lygodactylus tchokwe
- Pachydactylus angolensis
- Pachydactylus caraculicus
- Pachydactylus maiatoi
- Pachydactylus oreophilus
- Pachydactylus punctatus
- Pachydactylus rangei
- Pachydactylus rugosus
- Pachydactylus scherzi
- Pachydactylus scutatus
- Pachydactylus vanzyli
- Pachydactylus wahlbergii

== Lacertidae (true lizards) ==
Common name	Binomial name	Length	Global status	Global trend	Distribution	Image
Bivar's bushveld lizard	Heliobolus bivari	~15 cm (5.9 in)	Data deficient	?	Endemic to Angola; found in sandy, arid areas of savannahs and grasslands.	
Crawford-Cabral's bushveld lizard	Heliobolus crawfordi	~15 cm (5.9 in)	Data deficient	?	Endemic to Angola; inhabits sandy and semi-arid environments.	
Bushveld lizard	Heliobolus lugubris	~20 cm (7.9 in)	Least Concern	Steady	Found in southern Africa, including Angola, Namibia, Botswana, southwestern Zimbabwe, southern Mozambique, and South Africa; prefers sandy, open savannahs and dry habitats.	
Angolan rough-scaled lizard	Ichnotropis bivittata	~18 cm (7.1 in)	Least Concern	Steady	Found in Angola, Tanzania, Democratic Republic of the Congo, Zambia, Malawi, and Gabon; inhabits forests, savannahs, grasslands, and areas with loose soil.	
Cape rough-scaled lizard	Ichnotropis capensis	~20 cm (7.9 in)	Least Concern	Steady	Found in southern Africa, including Angola, Namibia, Botswana, and South Africa; prefers arid and semi-arid grasslands.	
Marx's rough-scaled lizard	Ichnotropis microlepidota	~18 cm (7.1 in)	Data deficient	?	Endemic to central Angola; associated with grasslands.	
Angolan sandveld lizard	Nucras broadleyi	~20 cm (7.9 in)	Least Concern	Steady	Endemic to southwestern Angola; inhabits arid savannahs and rocky areas.	
Scaled sandveld lizard	Nucras scalaris	~18 cm (7.1 in)	Least concern	?	Endemic to Angola; found in transitional zones between forests, grasslands, and rocky areas.	

== Scincidae (skinks) ==
- Acontias jappi
- Acontias kgalagadi
- Acontias mukwando
- Acontias occidentalis
- Eumecia anchietae
- Feylinia currori
- Feylinia elegans
- Feylinia grandisquamis
- Leptosiaphos dewittei
- Melanoseps occidentalis
- Mochlus hinkeli
- Mochlus sundevallii
- Panaspis breviceps
- Panaspis cabindae
- Panaspis ericae
- Panaspis maculicollis
- Panaspis mocamedensis
- Panaspis mundavambo
- Panaspis wahlbergii
- Sepsina angolensis
- Sepsina bayonii
- Sepsina copei
- Trachylepis albilabris
- Trachylepis albopunctata
- Trachylepis ansorgii
- Trachylepis attenboroughi
- Trachylepis bayonii
- Trachylepis binotata
- Trachylepis bocagii
- Trachylepis bouri
- Trachylepis chimbana
- Trachylepis damarana
- Trachylepis hilariae
- Trachylepis hoeschi
- Trachylepis huilensis
- Trachylepis laevis
- Trachylepis maculilabris
- Trachylepis notabilis
- Trachylepis occidentalis
- Trachylepis ovahelelo
- Trachylepis punctulata
- Trachylepis raymondlaurenti
- Trachylepis sulcata
- Trachylepis suzanae
- Trachylepis vunongue
- Trachylepis wahlbergii
- Trachylepis wilsoni

== Varanidae (monitor lizards) ==
Common name	Binomial name	Length	Global status	Global trend	Distribution	Image
Rock monitor	Varanus albigularis	~200 cm (79 in)	Least Concern	Steady	Found in southern, central, and eastern Africa, including Angola; inhabits savannahs, woodlands, and scrubland. Terrestrial and often found near termite mounds.	
Nile monitor	Varanus niloticus	~250 cm (98 in)	Least Concern	Steady	Widely distributed across sub-Saharan Africa, including Angola; inhabits rivers, wetlands, savannahs, and forests. Highly aquatic and opportunistic predator.	

== Testudines (turtles and tortoises) ==
Common name	Binomial name	Carapace length	Global status	Global trend	Distribution	Image
Loggerhead turtle	Caretta caretta	100 cm (39 in)	Vulnerable	▼	Found in temperate, subtropical, and tropical oceans worldwide; adults prefer coastal waters with rocky or muddy substrates, nest on steeply sloped, high-energy beaches.	
Green turtle	Chelonia mydas	150 cm (59 in)	Endangered	▼	Primarily aquatic. May be found at coasts or islands where it comes to nest.	
Leatherback turtle	Dermochelys coriacea	270 cm (110 in)	Vulnerable	▼	Found in all tropical and temperate oceans; nests on sandy beaches, highly pelagic, tolerates cold waters.	
Hawksbill turtle	Eretmochelys imbricata	100 cm (39 in)	Critically endangered	▼	Primarily aquatic.	
Bell's hinge-back tortoise	Kinixys belliana	220 mm (8.7 in)	Least Concern	Steady	Inhabits savannahs and woodlands across sub-Saharan Africa; terrestrial, often shelters in burrows or under vegetation.	
Forest hinge-back tortoise	Kinixys erosa	400 mm (16 in)	Data deficient	?	Inhabits lowland evergreen forests, marshes, and riverine galleries in West and Central Africa.	
Speke's hinge-back tortoise	Kinixys spekii	210 mm (8.3 in)	Vulnerable*	Steady	Found in savannahs and woodlands of southern and eastern Africa.	
Olive ridley turtle	Lepidochelys olivacea	75 cm (30 in)	Vulnerable	▼	Found in tropical oceans worldwide; nests in mass arribadas on sandy beaches.	
African helmeted turtle	Pelomedusa subrufa	25 cm (9.8 in)	Least Concern	Steady	Common in slow-moving freshwater bodies across sub-Saharan Africa.	
Okavango mud turtle	Pelusios bechuanicus	22 cm (8.7 in)	Least Concern	Steady	Inhabits rivers, swamps, and marshes in southern Africa; aquatic, prefers clear water with vegetation.	
West African mud turtle	Pelusios castaneus	30 cm (12 in)	Least Concern	Steady	Found in a variety of freshwater habitats in West and Central Africa; tolerates disturbed environments.	
Central African mud turtle	Pelusios chapini	18 cm (7.1 in)	Least Concern	Steady	Native to Central Africa; inhabits slow-moving freshwater habitats with abundant vegetation.	
African forest turtle	Pelusios gabonensis	23 cm (9.1 in)	Least Concern	Steady	Occurs in rivers, swamps, and marshes in Central and West Africa; aquatic.	
African dwarf mud turtle	Pelusios nanus	10 cm (3.9 in)	Data deficient	?	Found in shallow freshwater habitats in Angola, DRC, Zambia.	
Rhodesian mud turtle	Pelusios rhodesianus	17 cm (6.7 in)	Least Concern	?	Inhabits rivers and marshes in southern Africa; aquatic.	
Leopard tortoise	Stigmochelys pardalis	700 mm (28 in)	Least Concern	?	Found in savannahs and grasslands across eastern and southern Africa.	
African softshell turtle	Trionyx triunguis	95 cm (37 in)	Vulnerable	▼	Inhabits rivers, lakes, and estuaries in Africa and the Middle East; aquatic.	

*Not evaluated by IUCN Red List, but given a Vulnerable status by the TFTSG Provisional Red List in 2013.

== Crocodylidae (crocodiles) ==
Common name	Binomial name	Length	Global status	Global trend	Distribution	Image
Nile crocodile	Crocodylus niloticus	~500 cm (200 in) (max ~600 cm)	Least Concern	Steady	Found throughout sub-Saharan Africa, including Angola; inhabits rivers, lakes, mangroves, and freshwater wetlands, occasionally found in brackish waters.	
Dwarf crocodile	Osteolaemus tetraspis	~150 cm (59 in)	Vulnerable	▼	Found in swamps, slow-moving rivers, and forested wetlands in West and Central Africa, including parts of Northern Angola.	

== Typhlopidae (blind snakes) ==
Common name	Binomial name	Length	Global status	Global trend	Distribution	Image
Angolan blind snake	Afrotyphlops angolensis	~30 cm (12 in)	Least Concern	?	Angola; fossorial, found in sandy or loose soil habitats.	
Angolan giant blind snake	Afrotyphlops anomalus	~30 cm (12 in)	Least Concern	Steady	Angola, Democratic Republic of Congo; fossorial, inhabits loose soil and leaf litter.	
Blotched blind snake	Afrotyphlops congestus	~50 cm (20 in)	Least Concern	Steady	Sub-Saharan Africa, including Angola and Congo Basin; prefers tropical forests.	
African giant blind snake	Afrotyphlops dinga	~20 cm (7.9 in)	Data deficient	?	Angola, Democratic Republic of Congo; fossorial, poorly known species.	
Lined blind snake	Afrotyphlops lineolatus	~45 cm (18 in)	Least Concern	?	Found in savannahs and woodlands of southern and central Africa, including Angola.	
Spotted blind snake	Afrotyphlops punctatus	~40 cm (16 in)	Least Concern	?	Widely distributed across sub-Saharan Africa, including Angola; fossorial.	
Schlegel's beaked blind snake	Afrotyphlops schlegelii	~90 cm (35 in)	Least Concern	Steady	Found in savannahs and forests across sub-Saharan Africa, including Angola.	
Schmidt's blind snake	Afrotyphlops schmidti	~35 cm (14 in)	Data deficient	?	Angola; fossorial, poorly studied species, likely inhabits sandy soils.	
Léopoldville beaked snake	Letheobia praeocularis	~13 cm (5.1 in)	Least Concern	Steady	Angola; fossorial snake likely inhabiting tropical habitats.	
Western threadsnake	Namibiana labialis	~15 cm (5.9 in)	Least Concern	Steady	Found in southwestern Africa, including Angola and Namibia; fossorial.	
Benguela worm snake	Namibiana latifrons	~10 cm (3.9 in)	Least Concern	Steady	Southwestern Africa, including Angola; sandy and arid regions.	
Bocage's blind snake	Namibiana rostrata	~9 cm (3.5 in)	Least Concern	?	Angola, Namibia; fossorial, sandy or loose soil habitat.	
Shaba thread snake	Leptotyphlops kafubi	~12 cm (4.7 in)	Least Concern	Steady	Angola, Democratic Republic of Congo; fossorial snake found in savannas and urban areas.	
Peters's threadsnake	Leptotyphlops scutifrons	~15 cm (5.9 in)	Least Concern	?	Sub-Saharan Africa, widespread including Angola; fossorial.	

== Colubridae (colubrids) ==
- Boaedon angolensis
- Boaedon bocagei
- Boaedon branchi
- Boaedon fradei
- Boaedon lineatus
- Boaedon mentalis
- Boaedon olivaceus
- Boaedon variegatus
- Bothrophthalmus lineatus
- Crotaphopeltis barotseensis
- Crotaphopeltis hotamboeia
- Dasypeltis confusa
- Dasypeltis congolensis
- Dasypeltis palmarum
- Dasypeltis scabra
- Dipsadoboa shrevei
- Dispholidus punctatus
- Dispholidus typus
- Grayia caesar
- Grayia ornata
- Grayia smithii
- Grayia tholloni
- Hapsidophrys smaragdina
- Hemirhagerrhis viperina
- Hormonotus modestus
- Limaformosa capensis
- Limaformosa savorgnani
- Limaformosa vernayi
- Limnophis bangweolicus
- Limnophis bicolor
- Limnophis branchi
- Lycodonomorphus subtaeniatus
- Lycophidion hellmichi
- Lycophidion laterale
- Lycophidion meleagre
- Lycophidion multimaculatum
- Lycophidion namibianum
- Lycophidion ornatum
- Psammophis mossambicus
- Panaspis breviceps
- Philothamnus angolensis
- Philothamnus carinatus
- Philothamnus dorsalis
- Philothamnus heterodermus
- Philothamnus heterolepidotus
- Philothamnus hoplogaster
- Philothamnus nitidus
- Philothamnus ornatus
- Philothamnus semivariegatus
- Polemon collaris
- Polemon gabonensis
- Prosymna ambigua
- Prosymna angolensis
- Prosymna confusa
- Prosymna frontalis
- Prosymna lisima
- Prosymna visseri
- Psammophis angolensis
- Psammophis ansorgii
- Psammophis jallae
- Psammophis leightoni
- Psammophis leopardinus
- Psammophis lineatus
- Psammophis mossambicus
- Psammophis notostictus
- Psammophis subtaeniatus
- Psammophis trigrammus
- Psammophis zambiensis
- Psammophylax ocellatus
- Psammophylax rhombeatus
- Psammophylax tritaeniatus
- Pseudaspis cana
- Pythonodipsas carinata
- Rhamnophis aethiopissa
- Scaphiophis albopunctatus
- Thrasops flavigularis
- Thrasops jacksonii
- Toxicodryas blandingii
- Toxicodryas pulverulenta

== Elapidae (elapids) ==
Common name	Binomial name	Length	Global status	Global trend	Distribution	Image
Jameson's mamba	Dendroaspis jamesoni	~250 cm (98 in)	Least Concern	Steady	Found in Central and West Africa, including parts of northern Angola; inhabits forested and woodland areas, often arboreal but also active on the ground.	
Black mamba	Dendroaspis polylepis	~450 cm (180 in)	Least Concern	Steady	Widely distributed across sub-Saharan Africa, including Angola; prefers savannahs, open woodlands, and rocky areas.	
Günther's garter snake	Elapsoidea guentherii	~50 cm (20 in)	Least concern	?	Found in Angola, southern DRC, and Zambia; fossorial and inhabits dry savannahs.	
Angolan garter snake	Elapsoidea semiannulata	~60 cm (24 in)	Least concern	?	Found in Angola, Congo, DRC, and parts of Gabon; found in forests and savannas.	
Anchieta's cobra	Naja anchietae	~200 cm (79 in)	Least Concern	Steady	Found in Angola, Botswana, Namibia, and Zambia; inhabits dry savannahs.	
Banded water cobra	Naja annulata	~275 cm (108 in)	Least Concern	?	Found in Central and East Africa, including the Congo River basin; highly aquatic and inhabits rivers, lakes, and swamps.	
Forest cobra	Naja melanoleuca	~300 cm (120 in)	Least Concern	▼	Widely distributed across sub-Saharan forests, including Angola; found in forests, woodlands, and sometimes human settlements.	
Mozambique spitting cobra	Naja mossambica	~150 cm (59 in)	Least Concern	?	Found in southern Africa, including Angola; inhabits forests, savannahs, scrubland, and artificial terrain.	
Many-banded snake	Naja multifasciata	~200 cm (79 in)	Least Concern	Steady	Found in tropical rainforests of Central Africa, including very northern parts of Angola.	
Western barred spitting cobra	Naja nigricincta	~200 cm (79 in)	Least Concern	Steady	Found in southwestern Angola and Namibia; inhabits dry savannahs, shrubland, and rocky areas.	
Black-necked spitting cobra	Naja nigricollis	~200 cm (79 in)	Least Concern	?	Found throughout sub-Saharan Africa, including Angola; inhabits savannahs, woodlands, and urban areas.	
Brown forest cobra	Naja subfulva	~300 cm (120 in)	Least Concern	Steady	Found in forests and woodland savannahs of Central and East Africa, including Angola; found in forests, savannas, wetlands, and urban areas.	
Goldie's tree cobra	Pseudohaje goldii	~250 cm (98 in)	Least Concern	?	Found in forests of Central and West Africa, including Angola; found in forests.	

== Viperidae (vipers) ==
Common name	Binomial name	Length	Global status	Global trend	Distribution	Image
Variable bush viper	Atheris squamigera	~60 cm (24 in)	Least Concern	Steady	Found in Central and West Africa, inhabiting dense rainforests and often arboreal.	
Puff adder	Bitis arietans	~100 cm (39 in)	Least Concern	Steady	Widespread across Sub-Saharan Africa and parts of Arabia. Found in forests, savannahs, grasslands, wetlands, and rocky areas.	
Horned adder	Bitis caudalis	~40 cm (16 in)	Least Concern	Steady	Found in southern Africa, in arid regions such as deserts and semi-deserts.	
Gaboon viper	Bitis gabonica	~180 cm (71 in)	Vulnerable	▼	Found in Central and West African including parts of northern Angola. Inhabits rainforests, savannah, shrublands, grass lands, and urban areas.	
Angolan adder	Bitis heraldica	~30 cm (12 in)	Vulnerable	▼	Endemic to Angola, found in forests and rocky areas.	
Rhinoceros viper	Bitis nasicornis	~120 cm (47 in)	Vulnerable	▼	Found in Central African rainforests and sometimes in urban areas.	
Peringuey's desert adder	Bitis peringueyi	~25 cm (9.8 in)	Least Concern	Steady	Found in the Namib Desert of Namibia and southern Angola.	
Two-striped night adder	Causus bilineatus	~60 cm (24 in)	Least Concern	Steady	Found in Central and East Africa, in moist savannahs and wetlands.	
Forest night adder	Causus lichtensteinii	~60 cm (24 in)	Least Concern	Steady	Found in West and Central Africa, in forests and urban areas.	
Spotted night adder	Causus maculatus	~50 cm (20 in)	Least Concern	Steady	Found across Sub-Saharan Africa, often in drier habitats like savannahs and urban areas.	
Rasmussen's night adder	Causus rasmusseni	~50 cm (20 in)	Data deficient	?	Found in parts of West Africa, primarily in grasslands and forests.	
Green night adder	Causus resimus	~60 cm (24 in)	Least Concern	Steady	Found in Rwanda, Burundi, and other East African regions. Prefers savannas, grasslands, wetlands, and urban areas.	
Rhombic night adder	Causus rhombeatus	~90 cm (35 in)	Least Concern	Steady	Found in southern Africa, in various habitats including grasslands, and savannahs.	
West African carpet viper	Echis ocellatus	~75 cm (30 in)	Least Concern	Steady	Found in West Africa, predominantly in arid regions like savannahs and grasslands.	

== Pythonidae (pythons) ==
Common name	Binomial name	Length	Global status	Global trend	Distribution	Image
Angolan python	Python anchietae	~200 cm (79 in) (max ~430 cm)	Least Concern	Steady	Endemic to southern Africa, including Angola and Namibia; inhabits rocky outcrops, arid grasslands, and savannahs.	
Southern African python	Python natalensis	~500 cm (200 in) (max ~600 cm)	Least Concern	▼	Found in southern and southeastern Africa, including Angola; inhabits savannahs, forests, wetlands, and rocky areas.	
African rock python	Python sebae	~600 cm (240 in) (max ~700 cm)	Near threatened	▼	Widely distributed across sub-Saharan Africa; includes its range in Angola, occupying forests, savannahs, wetlands, and rocky habitats.	

== See also ==
- Fauna of Angola
- List of birds of Angola
- List of mammals of Angola
