= Bayon's skink =

There are two species of skink named Bayon's skink:

- Sepsina bayonii
- Trachylepis bayonii
