= Speckled skink =

Speckled skink may refer to:

- Oligosoma infrapunctatum, from New Zealand
- Trachylepis punctulata, from Africa, otherwise known as speckled sand skink

== See also ==
- Skink
