= Acanthocercus yemensis =

Conservation status
- Least Concern (IUCN 3.1)

Scientific classification
- Kingdom: Animalia
- Phylum: Chordata
- Class: Reptilia
- Order: Squamata
- Suborder: Iguania
- Family: Agamidae
- Genus: Acanthocercus
- Species: A. yemensis

Binomial name
- Acanthocercus yemensis (Klausewitz, 1954)
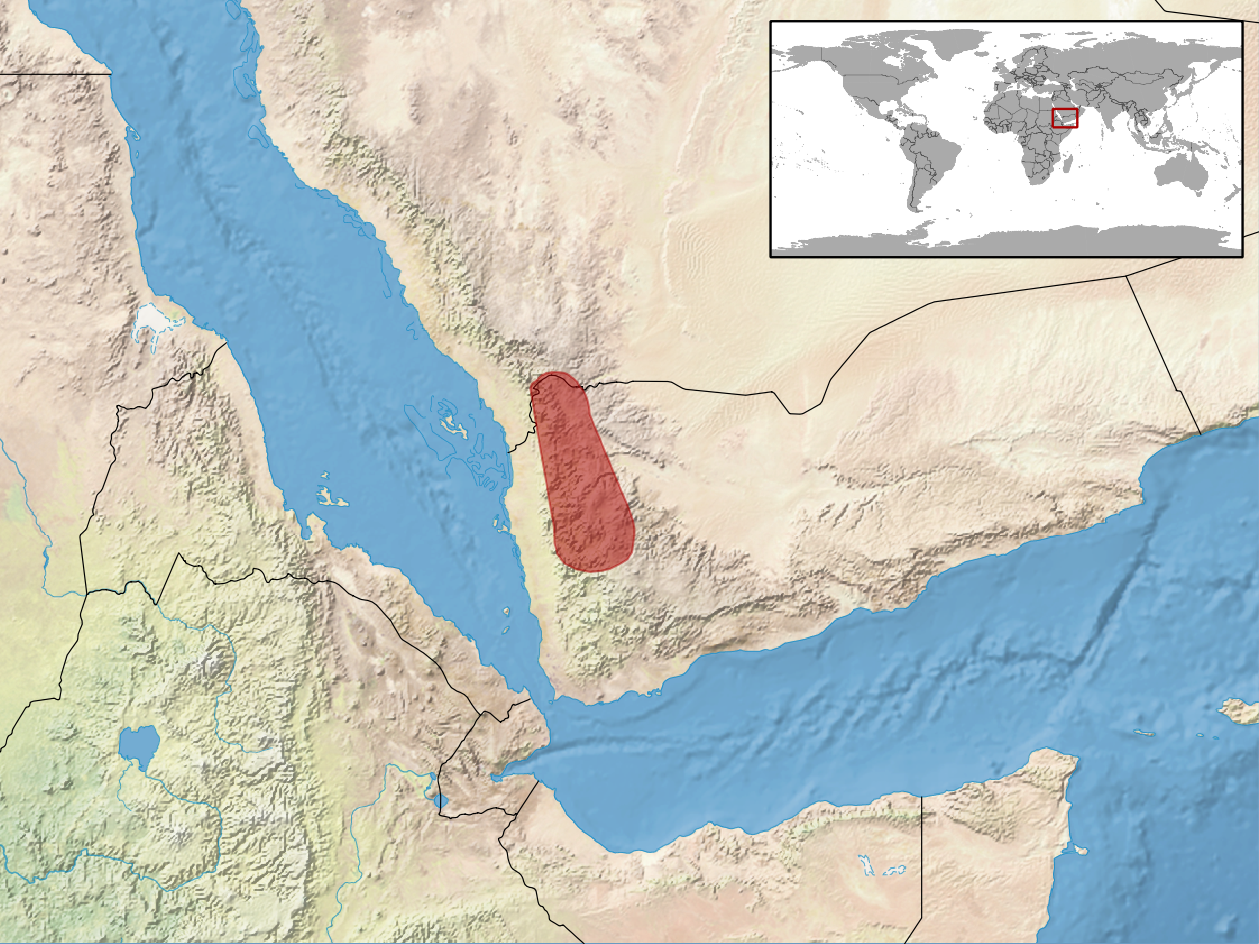

Species of lizard

Acanthocercus yemensis is a species of lizard in the family Agamidae. It is a small lizard found in Yemen and Saudi Arabia.
