= Acanthocercus kiwuensis =

Conservation status
- Least Concern (IUCN 3.1)

Scientific classification
- Kingdom: Animalia
- Phylum: Chordata
- Class: Reptilia
- Order: Squamata
- Suborder: Iguania
- Family: Agamidae
- Genus: Acanthocercus
- Species: A. kiwuensis

Binomial name
- Acanthocercus kiwuensis (Klausewitz, 1957)

Species of lizard

Acanthocercus kiwuensis, the Kivu blue-headed tree agama, is a species of lizard in the family Agamidae. It is a small lizard found in the Democratic Republic of the Congo.
