= Acanthocercus guentherpetersi =

Conservation status
- Least Concern (IUCN 3.1)

Scientific classification
- Kingdom: Animalia
- Phylum: Chordata
- Class: Reptilia
- Order: Squamata
- Suborder: Iguania
- Family: Agamidae
- Genus: Acanthocercus
- Species: A. guentherpetersi

Binomial name
- Acanthocercus guentherpetersi Largen & Spawls, 2006

Species of lizard

Acanthocercus guentherpetersi, also known commonly as Peter's ridgeback agama, is a small species of lizard in the subfamily Agaminae of the family Agamidae. The species is native to the Horn of Africa.

== Etymology ==
The specific name, guentherpetersi, is in honor of German herpetologist Günther Peters.

== Description ==
Acanthocercus guentherpetersi may attain a snout-to-vent length (SVL) of approximately 8 cm (3.1 in).

== Geographic distribution ==
Acanthocercus guentherpetersi is found in Eritrea and Ethiopia.

== Habitat ==
The preferred natural habitat of Acanthocercus guentherpetersi is shrubland with large boulders, at elevations of 1,400–2,287 m (4,593–7,503 ft).

== Reproduction ==
Acanthocercus guentherpetersi is oviparous.
