= Dalophia longicauda =

Scientific classification
- Kingdom: Animalia
- Phylum: Chordata
- Class: Reptilia
- Order: Squamata
- Clade: Amphisbaenia
- Family: Amphisbaenidae
- Genus: Dalophia
- Species: D. longicauda

Binomial name
- Dalophia longicauda (F. Werner, 1915)

Species of amphisbaenian

Dalophia longicauda is an amphisbaenian species in the family Amphisbaenidae. The species is found in Namibia, Botswana, Zimbabwe, the Caprivi Strip, and Zambia.
