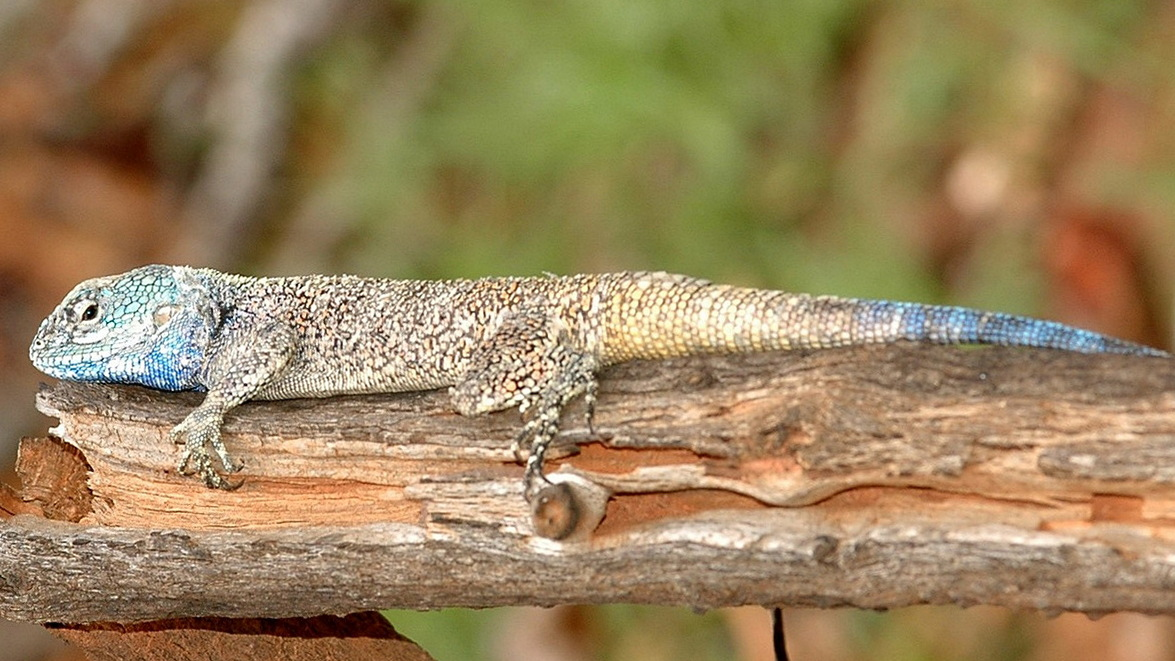

Conservation status
- Least Concern (IUCN 3.1)

Scientific classification
- Kingdom: Animalia
- Phylum: Chordata
- Class: Reptilia
- Order: Squamata
- Suborder: Iguania
- Family: Agamidae
- Genus: Acanthocercus
- Species: A. branchi

Binomial name
- Acanthocercus branchi Wagner, Greenbaum, & Bauer, 2012

= Acanthocercus branchi =

Species of lizard

Acanthocercus branchi is a species of lizard in the family Agamidae. It is a small lizard found in Zambia.
