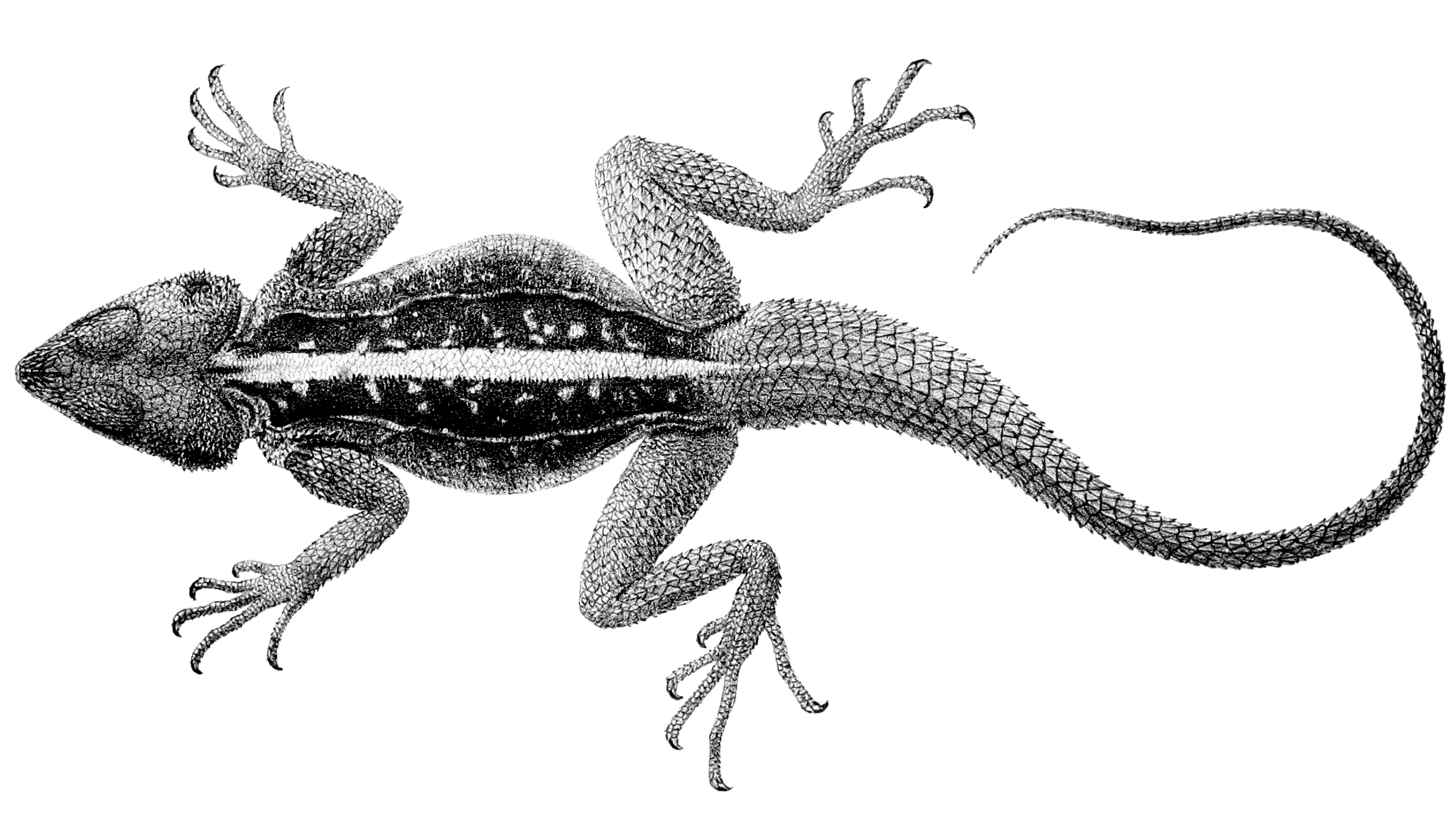

Conservation status
- Least Concern (IUCN 3.1)

Scientific classification
- Kingdom: Animalia
- Phylum: Chordata
- Class: Reptilia
- Order: Squamata
- Suborder: Iguania
- Family: Agamidae
- Genus: Acanthocercus
- Species: A. phillipsii

Binomial name
- Acanthocercus phillipsii (Boulenger, 1895)

= Acanthocercus phillipsii =

Species of lizard

Acanthocercus phillipsii, Philipps's ridgeback agama, is a species of lizard in the family Agamidae. It is a small lizard found in Eritrea, Ethiopia, and Somalia.
