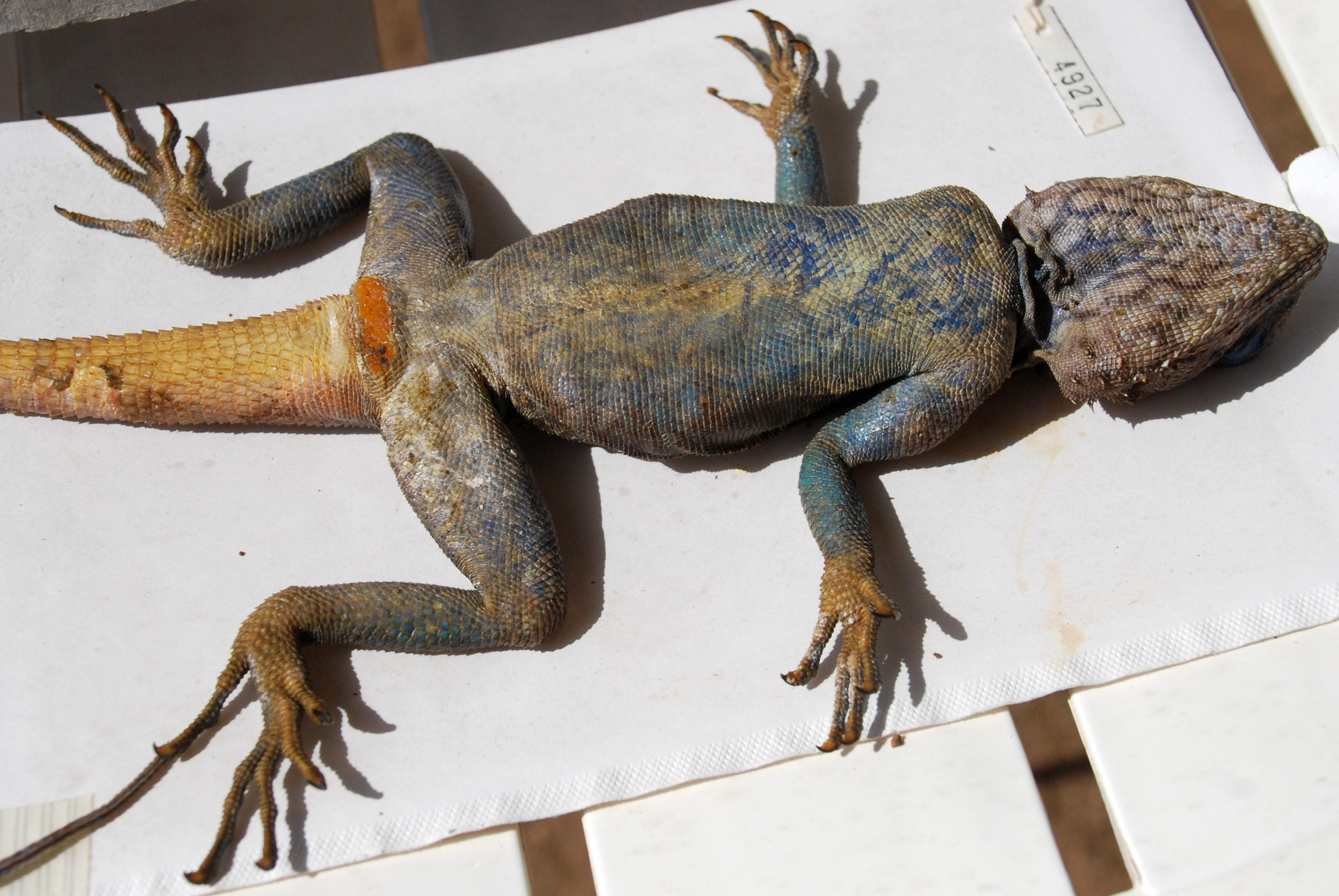

Conservation status
- Least Concern (IUCN 3.1)

Scientific classification
- Kingdom: Animalia
- Phylum: Chordata
- Class: Reptilia
- Order: Squamata
- Suborder: Iguania
- Family: Agamidae
- Genus: Acanthocercus
- Species: A. annectans

Binomial name
- Acanthocercus annectans (Blanford, 1870)
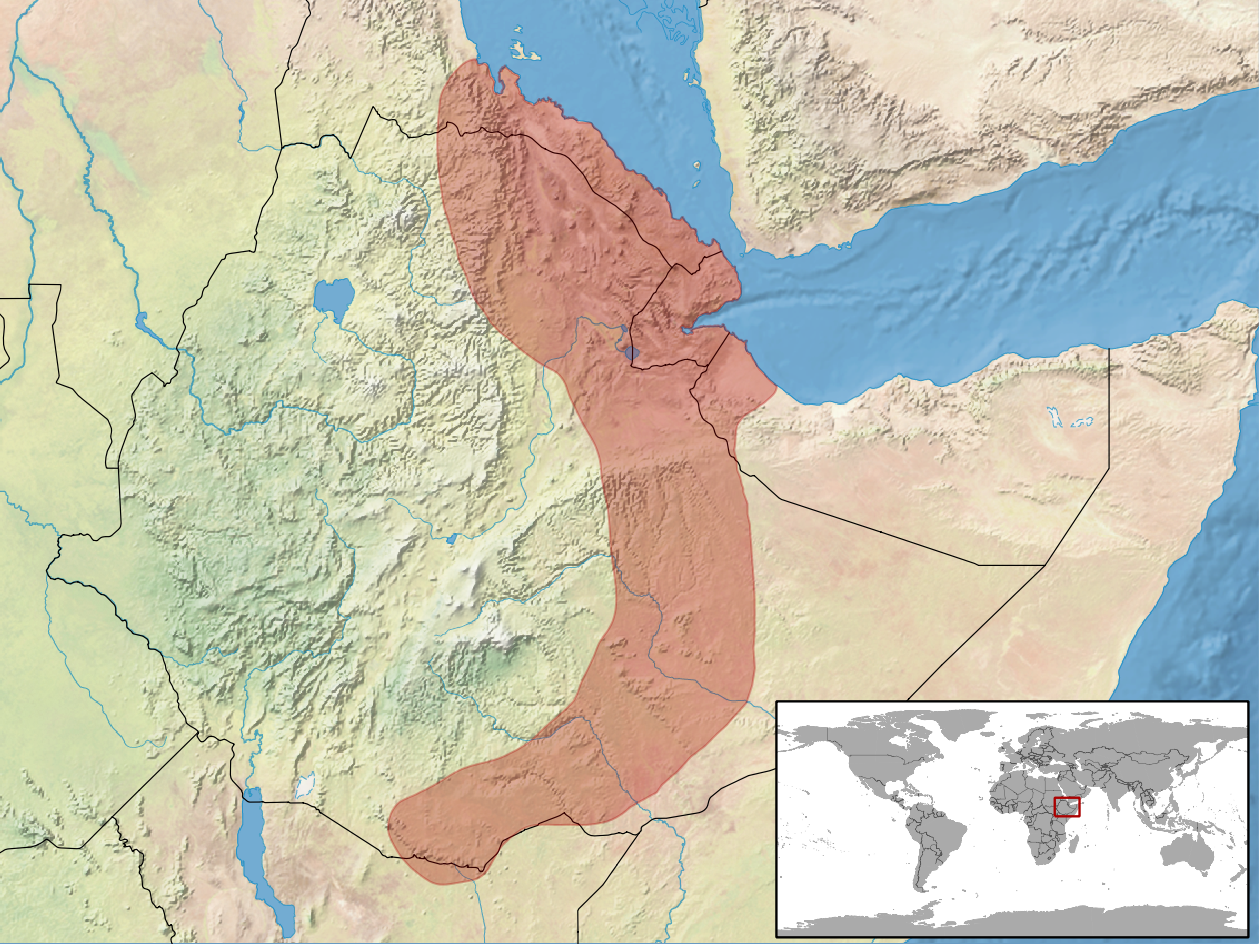

= Acanthocercus annectans =

Species of lizard

Acanthocercus annectans, the Eritrean rock agama or Eritrean ridgeback agama, is a species of lizard in the family Agamidae.

== Description ==
The Eritrean rock agama has irregular black lines and a white line down the centre of the line. Its scales are small, and its head is subtriangular, and flat. Its nose is blunt, ended by a rostral scale, and the frenal region being depressed. The tail is longer than the body and head, and the chin is covered in small rhomboidal scales decreasing in size.

== Habitat and Ecology ==
The Eritrean rock agama lives in forests, savannas, inland wetlands, inland cliffs and mountain peaks. They live in loose groups with large males often sharing living spaces. They eat insects and arthropods, most of it being ants.

== Conservation ==
The species is listed as Least Concern with the species being quite abundant and populations being stable. This species is still threatened by logging and annual and perennial non-timber crops.
