= Kolekanos plumicauda =

Scientific classification
- Domain: Eukaryota
- Kingdom: Animalia
- Phylum: Chordata
- Class: Reptilia
- Order: Squamata
- Infraorder: Gekkota
- Family: Gekkonidae
- Genus: Kolekanos
- Species: K. plumicauda

Binomial name
- Kolekanos plumicauda Haacke, 2008

Synonyms
- '

Genus of lizards

Kolekanos plumicauda is a species of African gecko found in Angola.
