= Limnophis =

Scientific classification
- Kingdom: Animalia
- Phylum: Chordata
- Class: Reptilia
- Order: Squamata
- Suborder: Serpentes
- Family: Colubridae
- Subfamily: Natricinae
- Genus: Limnophis; Günther, 1865

Genus of snakes

Limnophis is a genus of snakes in the subfamily Natricinae of the family Colubridae. The genus contains three species.

== Geographic range ==
Species of the genus Limnophis are endemic to southern Africa.

== Species ==
The following three species are recognized as being valid.

- Limnophis bangweolicus (Mertens, 1936) — eastern striped swamp snake, Bangweulu water snake
- Limnophis bicolor Günther, 1865 — bicolored swamp snake
- Limnophis branchi Conradie, Deepak, Keates, & Gower, 2020
