= Sepsina =

Scientific classification
- Kingdom: Animalia
- Phylum: Chordata
- Class: Reptilia
- Order: Squamata
- Family: Scincidae
- Subfamily: Scincinae
- Genus: Sepsina; Bocage, 1866

Species
- 5, see text.

Synonyms
- Dumerilia Bocage, 1866; Rhinoscincus W. Peters, 1874; Scincodipus W. Peters, 1875; Hakaria Steindachner, 1899

Genus of lizards

Sepsina is a genus of skinks (family Scincidae). The genus is endemic to southern Africa.

== Taxonomy ==
This genus is presently placed in the subfamily Scincinae, a subfamily which seems to be paraphyletic however. Sepsina belongs to a major clade of this group which does not seem to include the type genus Scincus. Thus, it will probably be eventually assigned to a new, yet-to-be-named subfamily.

== Species ==
The following five species are recognized:

- Sepsina alberti Hewitt, 1929 – Albert's skink, Albert's burrowing skink
- Sepsina angolensis Bocage, 1866 – Angola skink
- Sepsina bayonii (Bocage, 1866) – Bayon's skink
- Sepsina copei Bocage, 1873 – sepsina skink, Cope's reduced-limb skink
- Sepsina tetradactyla W. Peters, 1874 – four-fingered skink
