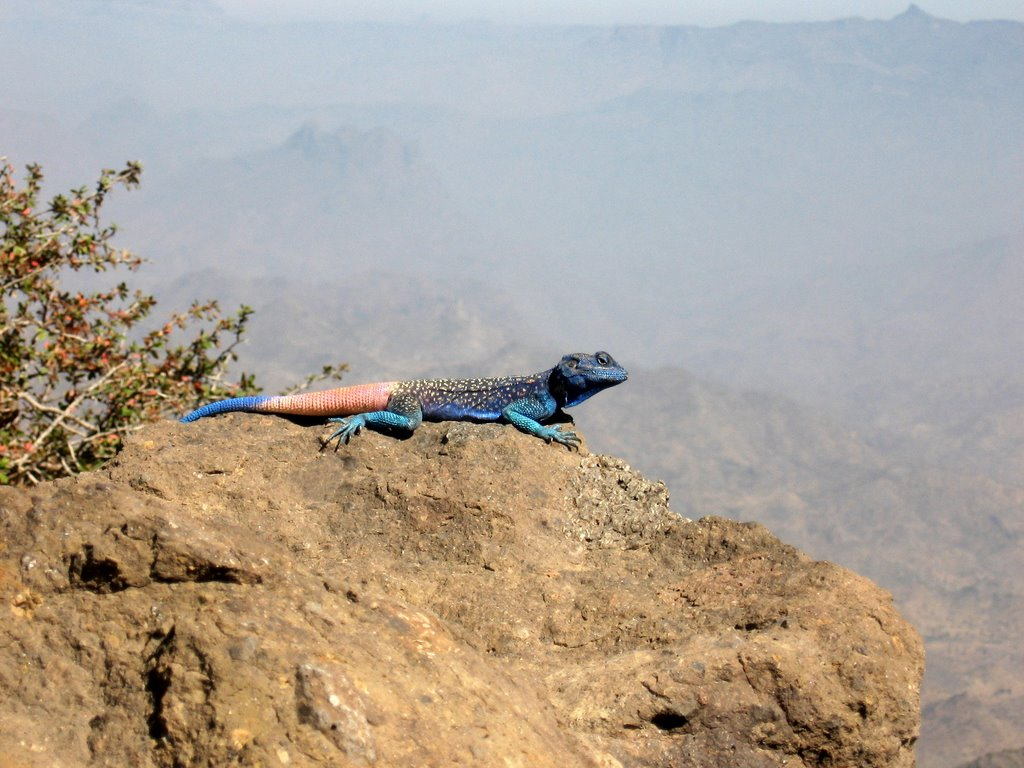

Conservation status
- Least Concern (IUCN 3.1)

Scientific classification
- Kingdom: Animalia
- Phylum: Chordata
- Class: Reptilia
- Order: Squamata
- Suborder: Iguania
- Family: Agamidae
- Genus: Acanthocercus
- Species: A. adramitanus

Binomial name
- Acanthocercus adramitanus (Anderson, 1896)
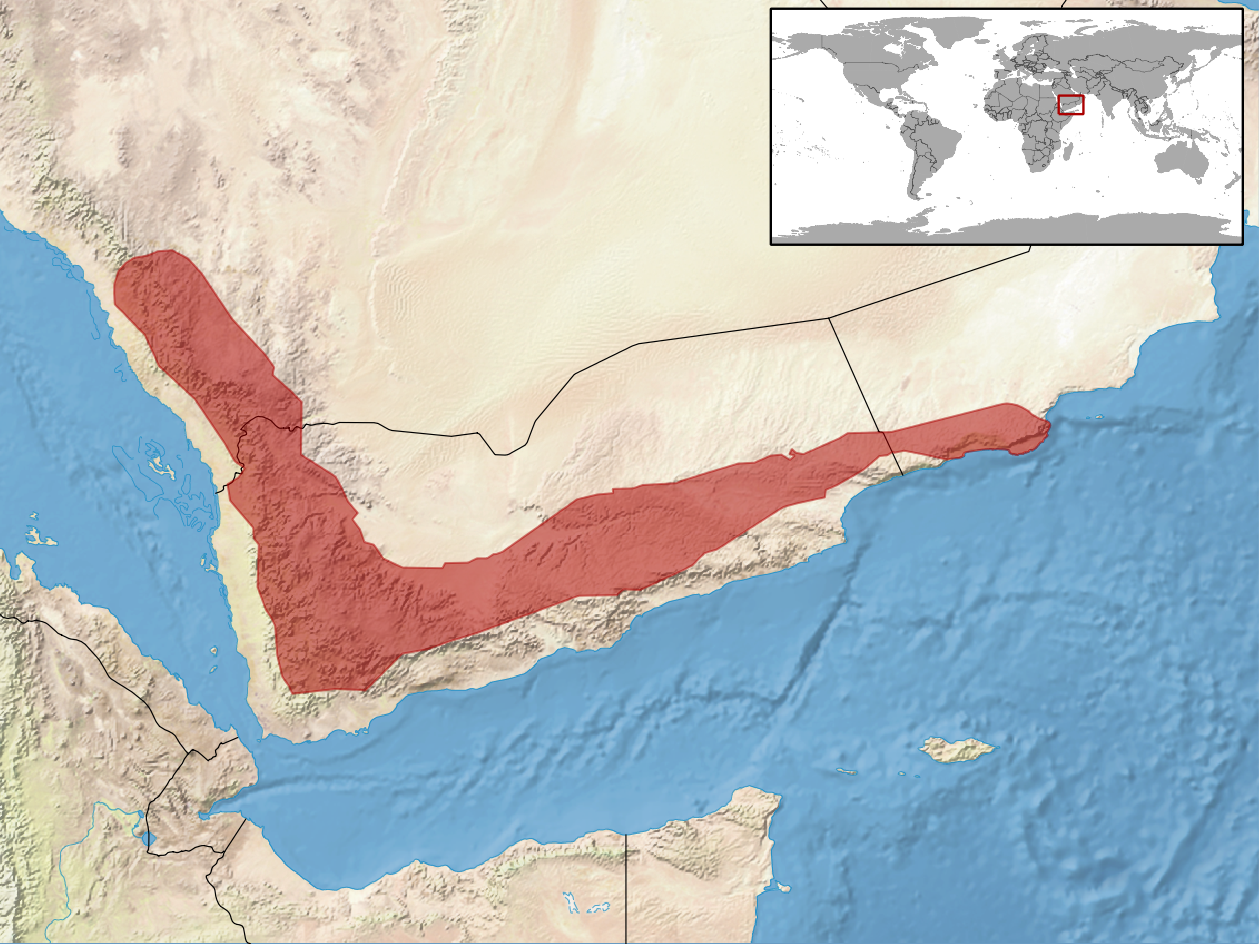

Synonyms
- Agama adramitana Anderson, 1896; Agama cyanogaster adramitana — Klausewitz, 1954; Agama adramitana — Arnold, 1980; Acanthocercus adramitanus — Schätti & Gasperetti, 1994; Laudakia adramitanus — Manthey & Schuster, 1999; Acanthocercus adramitanus — Barts & Wilms, 2003

= Acanthocercus adramitanus =

Species of lizard

Acanthocercus adramitanus, also known commonly as Anderson's rock agama or the Hadramaut agama, is a small species of lizard in the family Agamidae. The species is endemic to the Arabian Peninsula.

== Geographic range ==
A. adramitanus is found in Oman, Saudi Arabia, and Yemen.

== Habitat ==
The preferred natural habitat of A. adramitanus is rocky areas, at altitudes of 2,000 m (6,600 ft) or less.

== Description ==
A. adramitanus may attain a snout-to-vent length (SVL) of 15 cm (5.9 in). The tail is long, about twice SVL. Females are slightly smaller than males. Females may be bluish, and males may be intensely blue.

== Diet ==
A. adramitanus preys upon insects.

== Reproduction ==
A. adramitanus is oviparous.
