= Dalophia luluae =

Conservation status
- Endangered (IUCN 3.1)

Scientific classification
- Kingdom: Animalia
- Phylum: Chordata
- Class: Reptilia
- Order: Squamata
- Clade: Amphisbaenia
- Family: Amphisbaenidae
- Genus: Dalophia
- Species: D. luluae

Binomial name
- Dalophia luluae (de Witte & Laurent, 1942)

Synonyms
- Monopeltis luluae de Witte & Laurent, 1942; Tomuropeltis luluae — Laurent, 1947; Dalophia luluae — Broadley, 1998

Species of amphisbaenian

Dalophia luluae is an endangered species of amphisbaenian in the family Amphisbaenidae. The species is endemic to the Democratic Republic of the Congo.

== Etymology ==
The specific name, luluae, refers to the Lulu River of the Democratic Republic of the Congo.

== Habitat ==
The preferred natural habitat of Dalophia luluae is savanna, at altitudes of 800–1,000 m (2,600–3,300 ft).

== Behavior ==
Dalophia luluae is terrestrial and fossorial.

== Reproduction ==
D. luluae is oviparous.
