= Sepsina alberti =

Conservation status
- Least Concern (IUCN 3.1)

Scientific classification
- Kingdom: Animalia
- Phylum: Chordata
- Class: Reptilia
- Order: Squamata
- Family: Scincidae
- Genus: Sepsina
- Species: S. alberti

Binomial name
- Sepsina alberti Hewitt, 1929
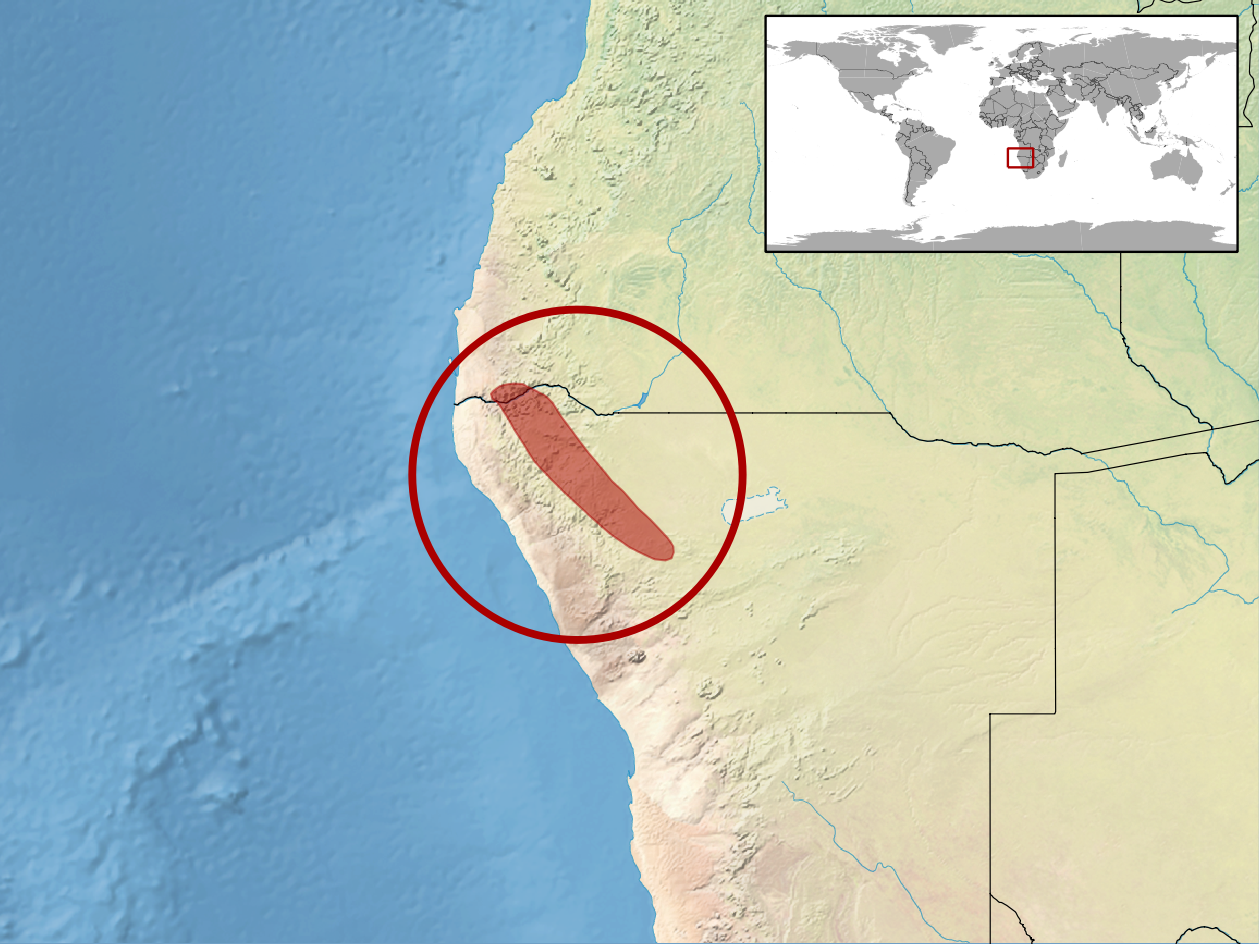

Species of reptile

Sepsina alberti, also known commonly as Albert's skink and Albert's burrowing skink, is a species of lizard in the family Scincidae. The species is endemic to Namibia.

== Etymology ==
Unfortunately, Hewitt did not explain to whom the specific name, alberti, refers. It may be in honor of Albert I of Belgium, or Belgian-British herpetologist George Albert Boulenger, or an altogether different Albert.

== Habitat ==
The preferred natural habitats of S. alberti are rocky areas and savanna, at altitudes of 500–1,300 m (1,600–4,300 ft).

== Description ==
Adults of S. alberti usually have a snout-to-vent length (SVL) of 4–5 centimetres (1.6–2.0 in). The maximum recorded SVL is 5.5 cm (2.2 in). The legs are short, but well developed, with four toes on each foot, and with a claw on each toe.

== Reproduction ==
S. alberti is viviparous.
