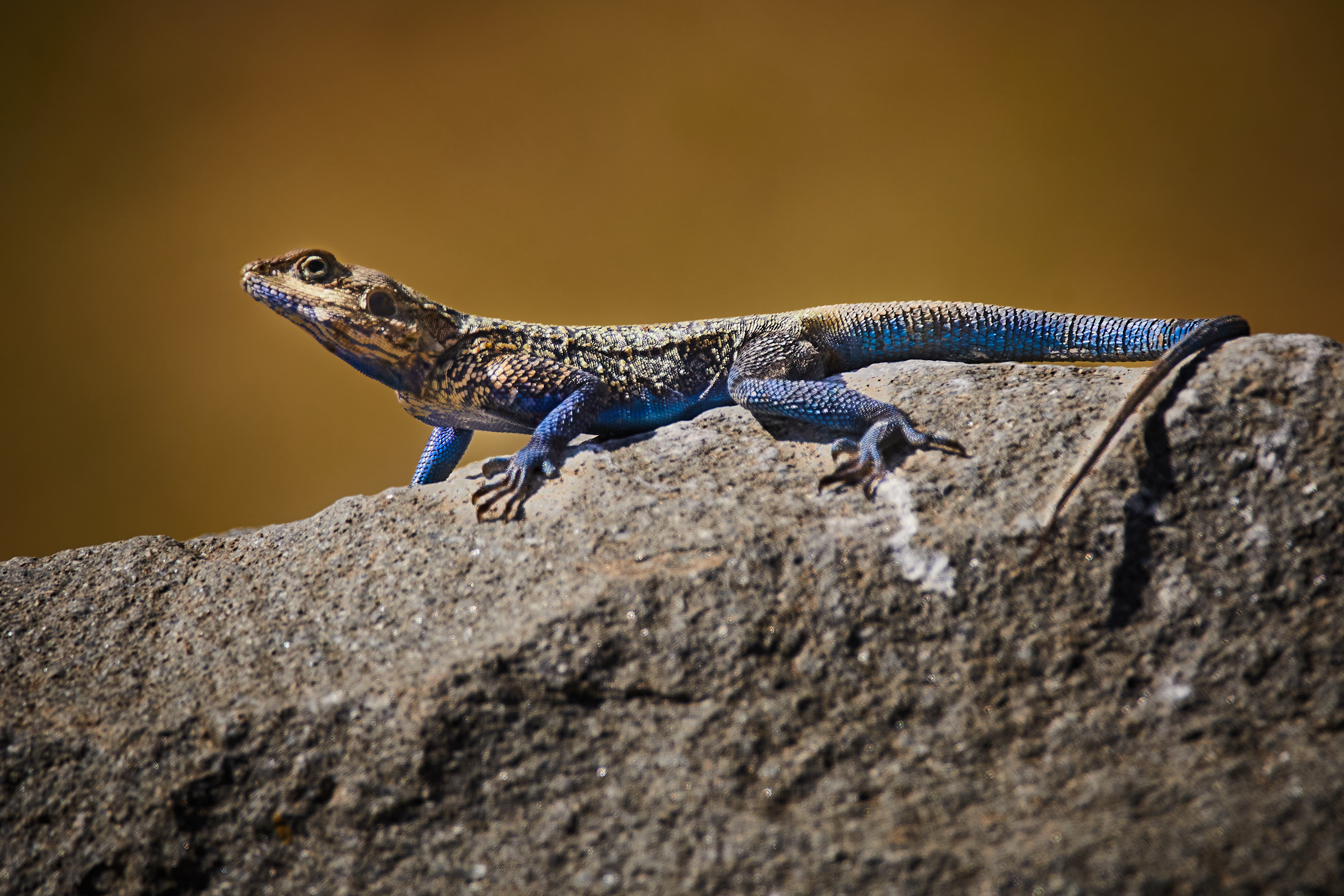

Conservation status
- Least Concern (IUCN 3.1)

Scientific classification
- Kingdom: Animalia
- Phylum: Chordata
- Class: Reptilia
- Order: Squamata
- Suborder: Iguania
- Family: Agamidae
- Genus: Acanthocercus
- Species: A. cyanogaster

Binomial name
- Acanthocercus cyanogaster (Rüppell, 1835)
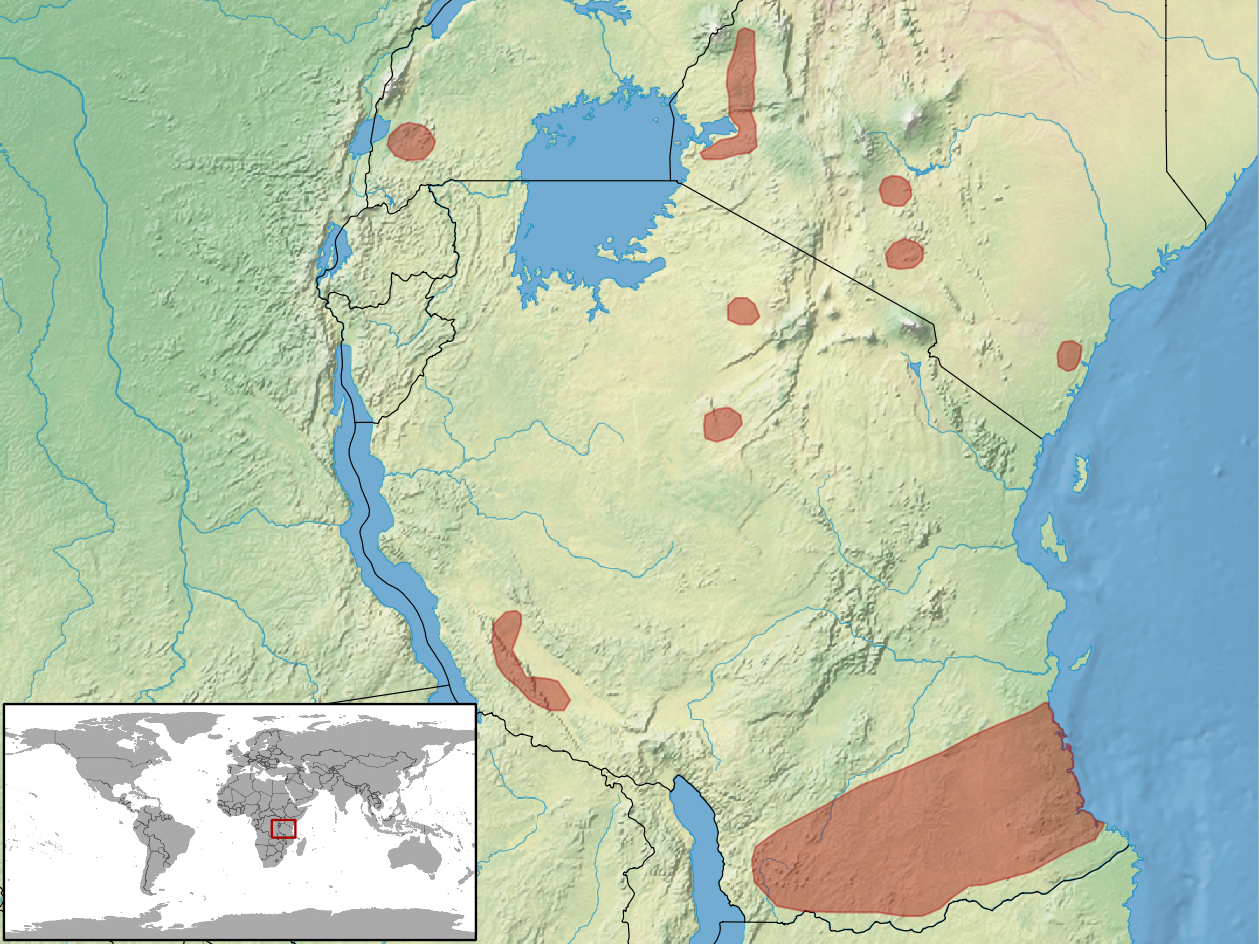

= Acanthocercus cyanogaster =

Species of lizard

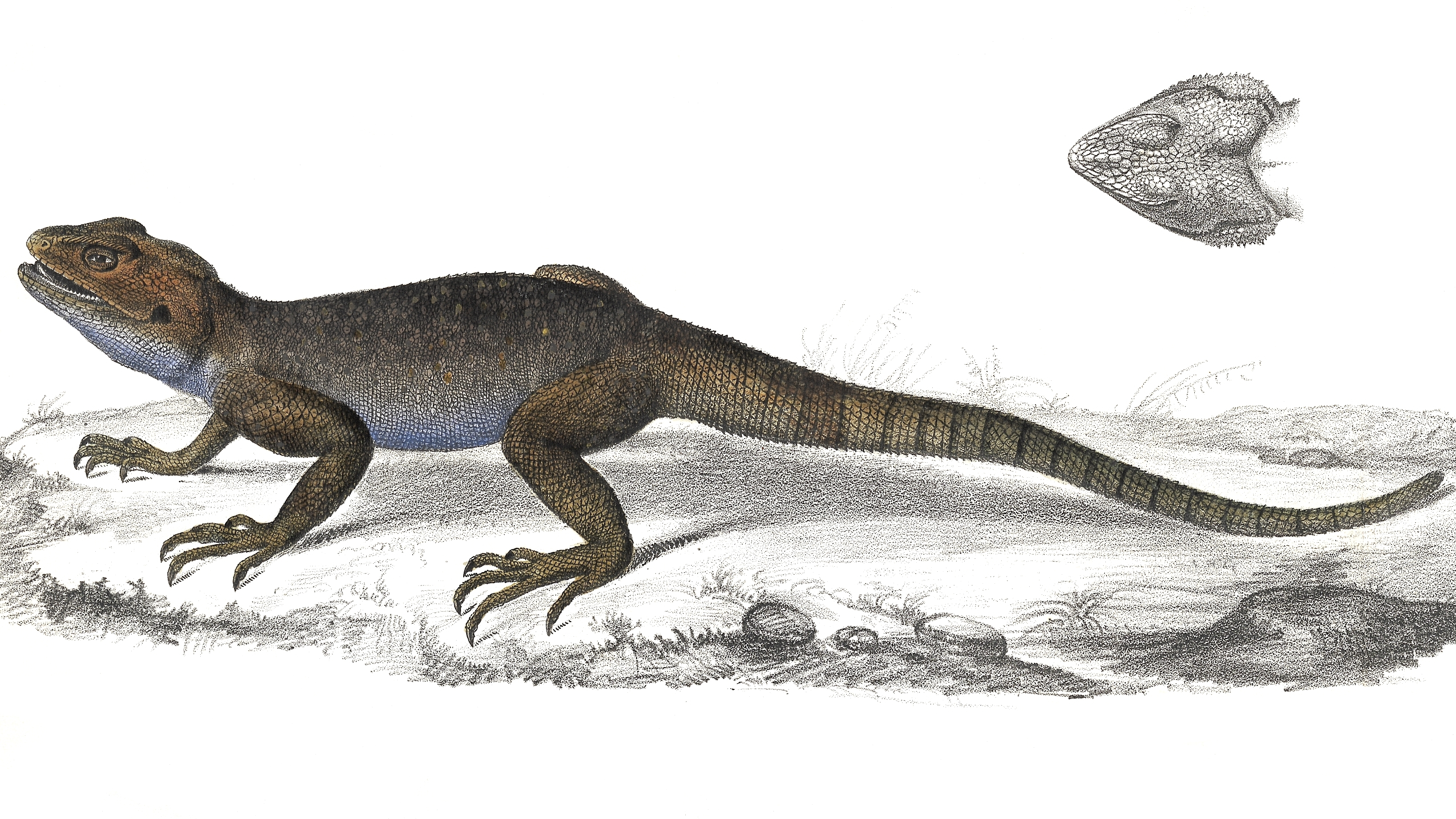
Acanthocercus cyanogaster

Acanthocercus cyanogaster, the blue-bellied ridgeback agama or black-necked tree agama, is a species of lizard in the family Agamidae. It is a small lizard found in Ethiopia, Eritrea, and Somalia.
