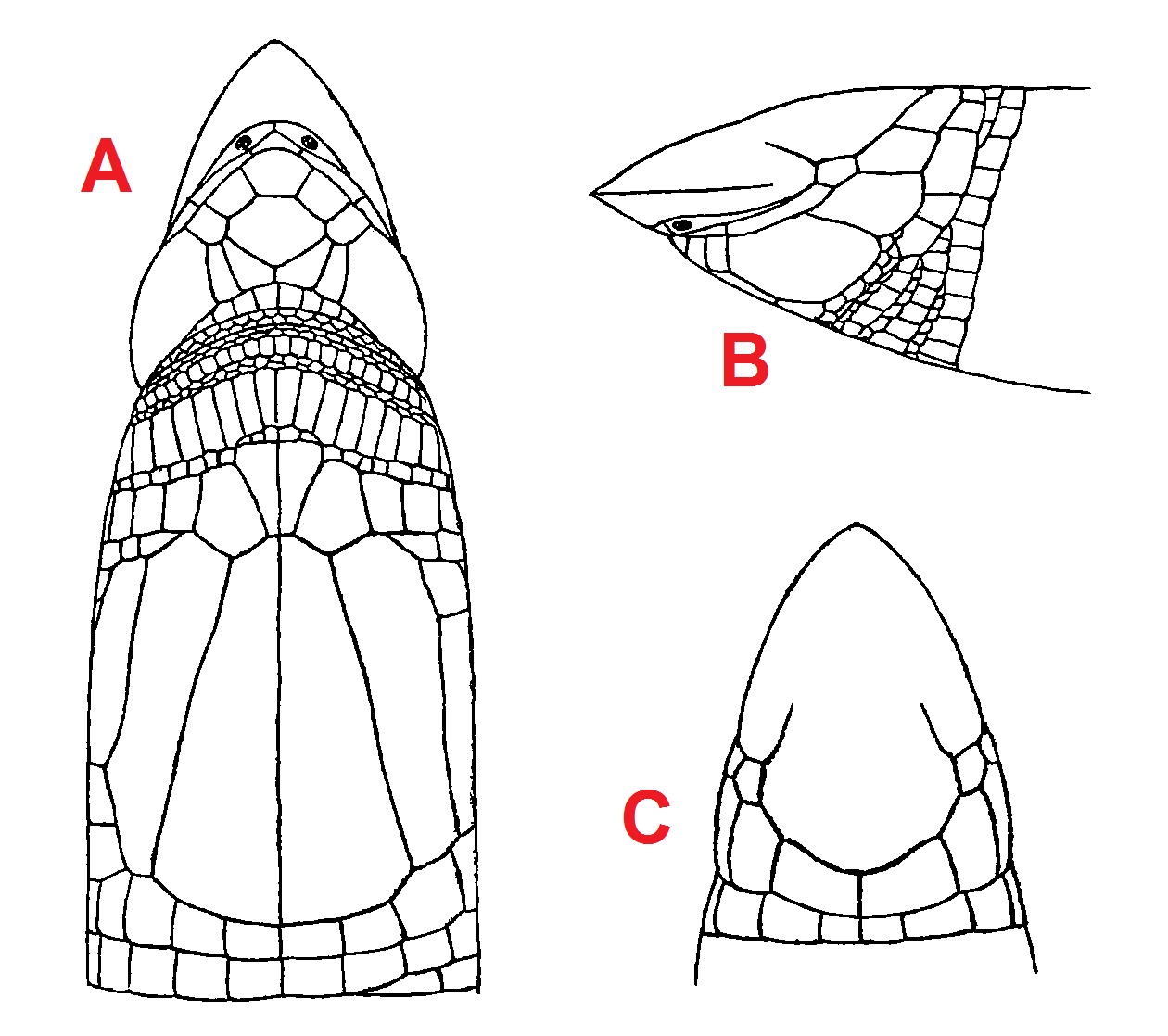
- Head and pectoral region from below (A), head lateral (B), and from above (C).

Scientific classification
- Kingdom: Animalia
- Phylum: Chordata
- Class: Reptilia
- Order: Squamata
- Clade: Amphisbaenia
- Family: Amphisbaenidae
- Genus: Dalophia (Gray, 1865)

Species
- Seven species (see text)

= Dalophia =

Genus of amphisbaenians

Dalophia is a genus of amphisbaenians in the family Amphisbaenidae, commonly known as worm lizards. Seven species are placed in this genus, all of them endemic to Africa.

== Species ==
There are seven recognized species:

- Dalophia angolensis Gans, 1976
- Dalophia ellenbergeri (Angel, 1920)
- Dalophia gigantea (Peracca, 1903)
- Dalophia longicauda (F. Werner, 1915)
- Dalophia luluae (de Witte & Laurent, 1942)
- Dalophia pistillum (Boettger, 1895) – pestle-tailed worm lizard
- Dalophia welwitschii (Gray, 1865)

Nota bene: A binomial authority in parentheses indicates that the species was originally described in a genus other than Dalophia.
