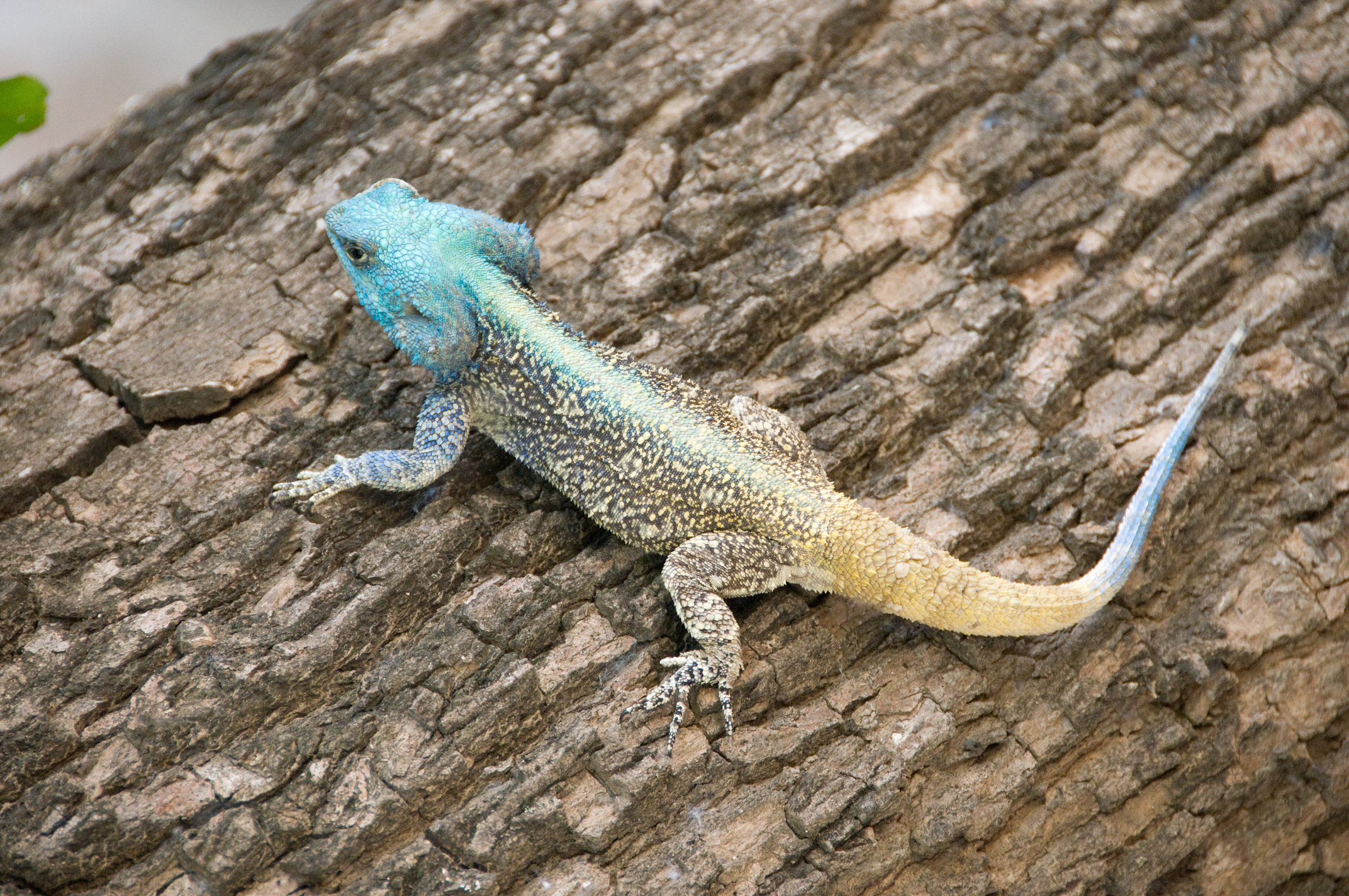
- Acanthocercus atricollis, southern tree agama

Scientific classification
- Kingdom: Animalia
- Phylum: Chordata
- Class: Reptilia
- Order: Squamata
- Suborder: Iguania
- Family: Agamidae
- Subfamily: Agaminae
- Genus: Acanthocercus; Fitzinger, 1843

= Acanthocercus =

Genus of lizards

Acanthocercus is a genus of lizards in the family Agamidae. The genus is endemic to Africa and the Arabian Peninsula.

== Species ==
Common name	Scientific name	IUCN Red List Status	Distribution	Picture
Anderson's rock agama, Hadramaut agama	Acanthocercus adramitanus (Anderson, 1896)	LC^{IUCN}		
Eritrean ridgeback agama, Eritrean rock agama	Acanthocercus annectans (Blanford, 1870)	LC^{IUCN}		
black-necked agama, black-necked ridgeback agama, blue-headed tree agama, blue-throated agama, southern tree agama	Acanthocercus atricollis (A. Smith, 1849)	LC^{IUCN}		
	Acanthocercus branchi Wagner, Greenbaum & Bauer, 2012		Zambia	
	Acanthocercus ceriacoi Marques, Parrinha, Santos, Bandeira, Butler, Sousa, Bauer, & Wagner, 2022			
Falk's blue-headed tree agama	Acanthocercus cyanocephalus (Falk, 1925)			
black-necked tree agama, blue-bellied ridgeback agama	Acanthocercus cyanogaster (Rüppell, 1835)	LC^{IUCN}		
black-necked agama, blue-headed tree agama, blue-throated agama, southern tree agama	Acanthocercus gregorii (Günther, 1894)			
Peter's ridgeback agama	Acanthocercus guentherpetersi Largen & Spawls, 2006			
Kivu blue-headed tree agama	Acanthocercus kiwuensis (Klausewitz, 1957)			
	Acanthocercus margaritae Wagner, Butler, Ceriaco, & Bauer, 2021		Namibia and Angola	
black-necked agama, black-necked ridgeback agama, blue-headed tree agama, blue-throated agama, southern tree agama	Acanthocercus minutus (Klausewitz, 1957)			
Phillips' ridgeback agama	Acanthocercus phillipsii (Boulenger, 1895)			
Uganda blue-headed tree agama	Acanthocercus ugandaensis (Klausewitz, 1957)			
	Acanthocercus yemensis (Klausewitz, 1954)	LC^{IUCN}		

Nota bene: A binomial authority in parentheses indicates that the species was originally described in a genus other than Acanthocercus.
