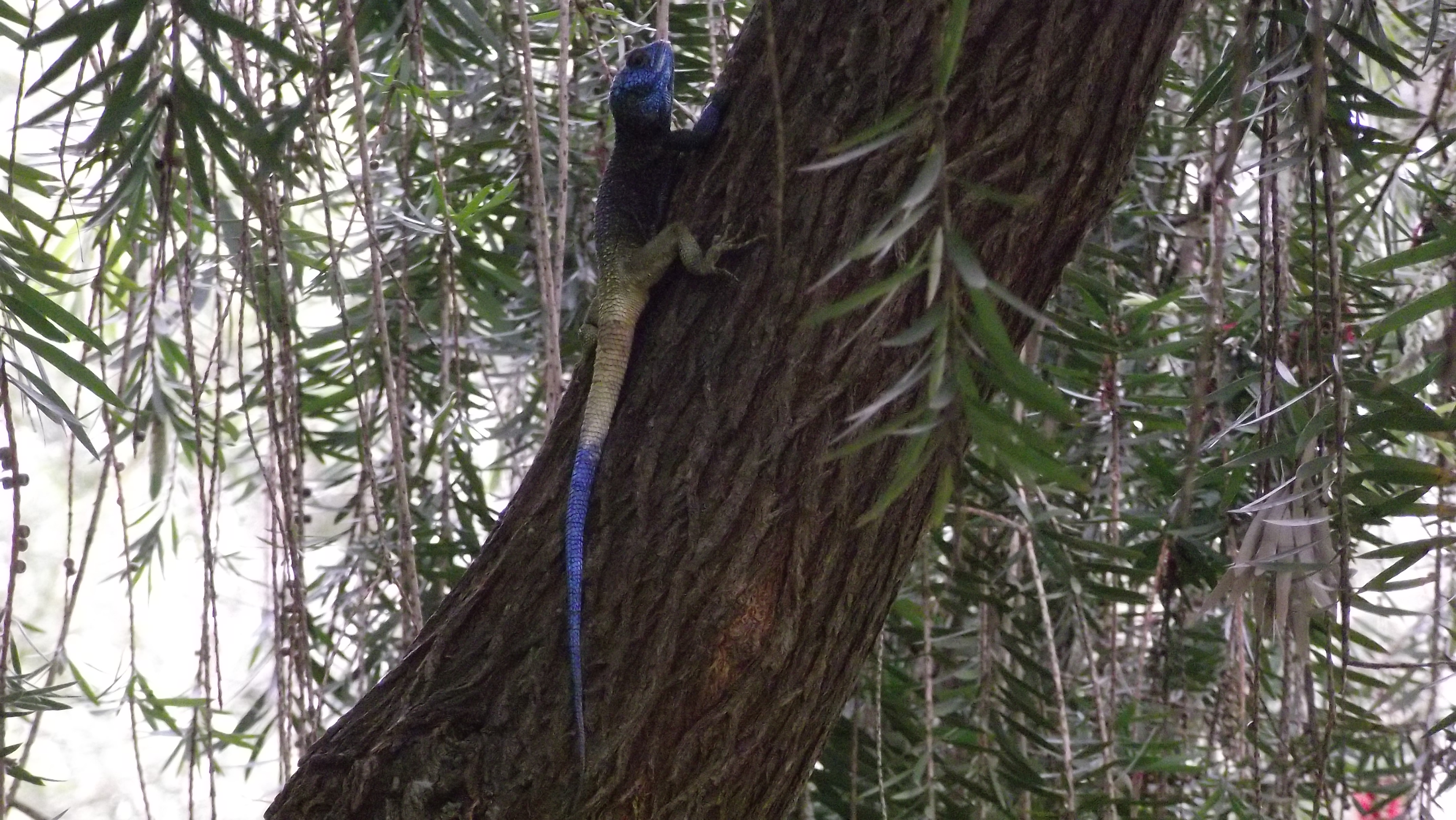

Conservation status
- Least Concern (IUCN 3.1)

Scientific classification
- Kingdom: Animalia
- Phylum: Chordata
- Class: Reptilia
- Order: Squamata
- Suborder: Iguania
- Family: Agamidae
- Genus: Acanthocercus
- Species: A. ugandaensis

Binomial name
- Acanthocercus ugandaensis (Klausewitz, 1957)

= Acanthocercus ugandaensis =

Species of lizard

Uganda blue headed tree agama is the same as Acanthocercus ugandaensis

Acanthocercus ugandaensis, the Uganda blue-headed tree agama, is a species of lizard in the family Agamidae. It is a small lizard found in Uganda and Tanzania.
