= Dalophia gigantea =

Scientific classification
- Kingdom: Animalia
- Phylum: Chordata
- Class: Reptilia
- Order: Squamata
- Clade: Amphisbaenia
- Family: Amphisbaenidae
- Genus: Dalophia
- Species: D. gigantea

Binomial name
- Dalophia gigantea (Peracca, 1903)

Species of amphisbaenian

Dalophia gigantea is an amphisbaenian species in the family Amphisbaenidae. The species is endemic to the Democratic Republic of the Congo.
