= Sepsina tetradactyla =

Scientific classification
- Domain: Eukaryota
- Kingdom: Animalia
- Phylum: Chordata
- Class: Reptilia
- Order: Squamata
- Family: Scincidae
- Genus: Sepsina
- Species: S. tetradactyla

Binomial name
- Sepsina tetradactyla Peters, 1874

Species of reptile

Sepsina tetradactyla, the four-fingered skink, is a species of lizard which is found in Tanzania, Malawi, Zambia, and Democratic Republic of the Congo.
