= Kolekanos spinicaudus =

Scientific classification
- Kingdom: Animalia
- Phylum: Chordata
- Class: Reptilia
- Order: Squamata
- Suborder: Gekkota
- Family: Gekkonidae
- Genus: Kolekanos
- Species: K. spinicaudus

Binomial name
- Kolekanos spinicaudus Lobón-Rovira, Conradie, Baptista, & Vaz Pinto, 2022

Synonyms
- '

Genus of lizards

Kolekanos spinicaudus is a species of African gecko found in Angola.
