= Trachylepis raymondlaurenti =

Scientific classification
- Kingdom: Animalia
- Phylum: Chordata
- Class: Reptilia
- Order: Squamata
- Family: Scincidae
- Genus: Trachylepis
- Species: T. raymondlaurenti

Binomial name
- Trachylepis raymondlaurenti Marques, Ceríaco, Bandeira, Pauwels & Bauer, 2019

Species of lizard

Trachylepis raymondlaurenti, also known commonly as Laurent's long-tailed skink, is a species of lizard in the family Scincidae. The species is endemic to Africa.

== Etymology ==
The specific name, raymondlaurenti, is in honor of Belgian herpetologist Raymond Ferdinand Laurent.

== Geographic range ==
T. raymondlaurenti is found in Angola, Democratic Republic of the Congo, and Zambia.

== Description ==
Medium-sized for its genus, T. raymondlaurenti may attain a snout-to-vent length (SVL) of almost 8 cm (3.1 in). The tail is very long, more than twice SVL.

== Reproduction ==
The mode of reproduction of T. raymondlaurenti is unknown.
