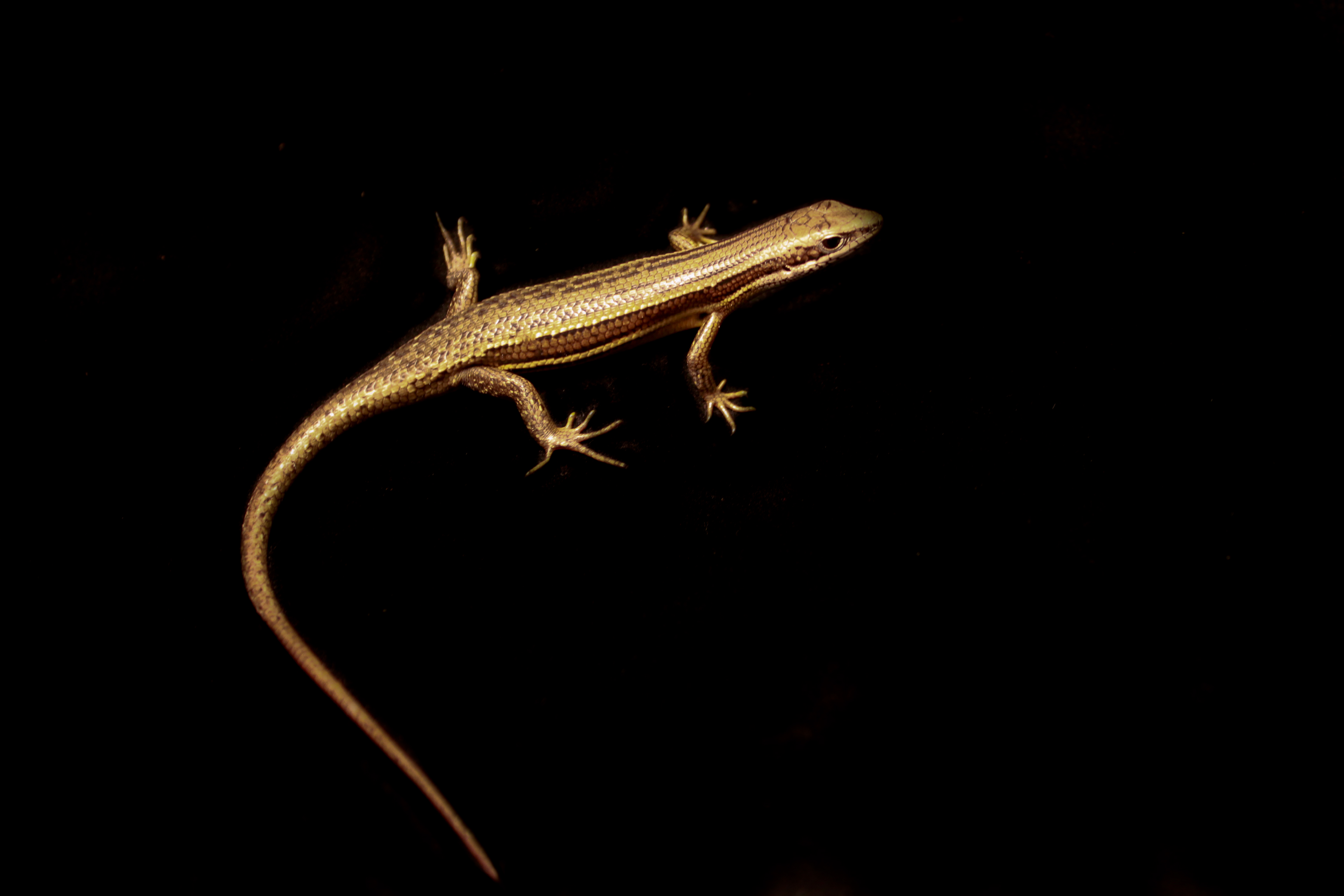

Scientific classification
- Domain: Eukaryota
- Kingdom: Animalia
- Phylum: Chordata
- Class: Reptilia
- Order: Squamata
- Family: Scincidae
- Genus: Trachylepis
- Species: T. albilabris

Binomial name
- Trachylepis albilabris Hallowell, 1857

= Trachylepis albilabris =

Species of lizard

Trachylepis albilabris, the Guinea mabuya, is a species of skink found in Africa.
