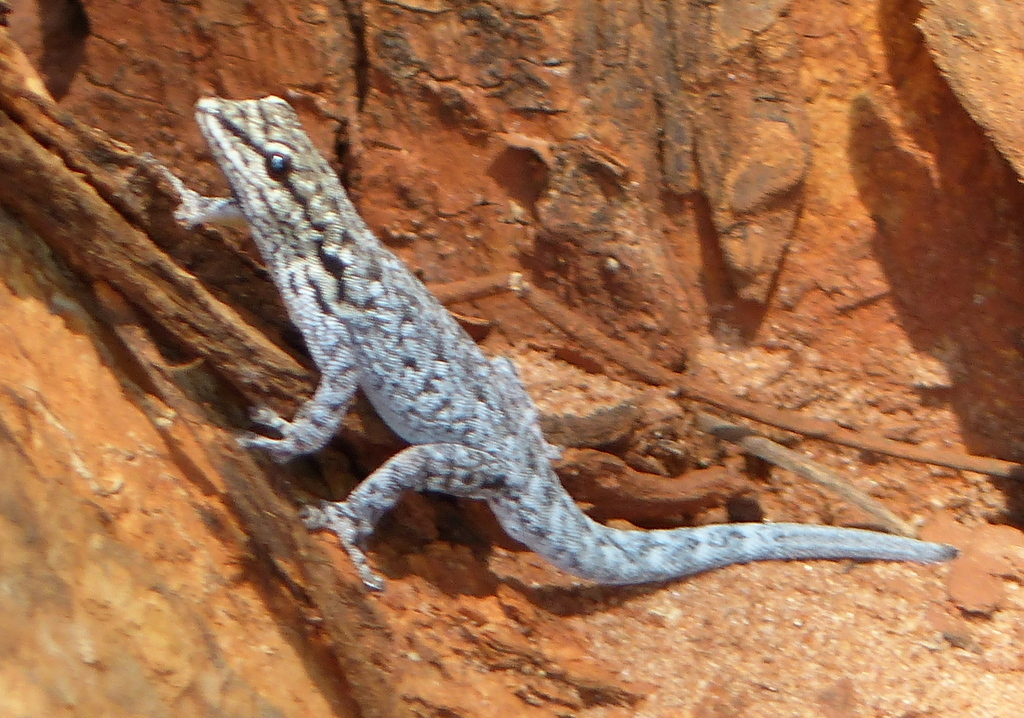

Conservation status
- Least Concern (IUCN 3.1)

Scientific classification
- Domain: Eukaryota
- Kingdom: Animalia
- Phylum: Chordata
- Class: Reptilia
- Order: Squamata
- Infraorder: Gekkota
- Family: Gekkonidae
- Genus: Lygodactylus
- Species: L. chobiensis

Binomial name
- Lygodactylus chobiensis FitzSimons, 1932
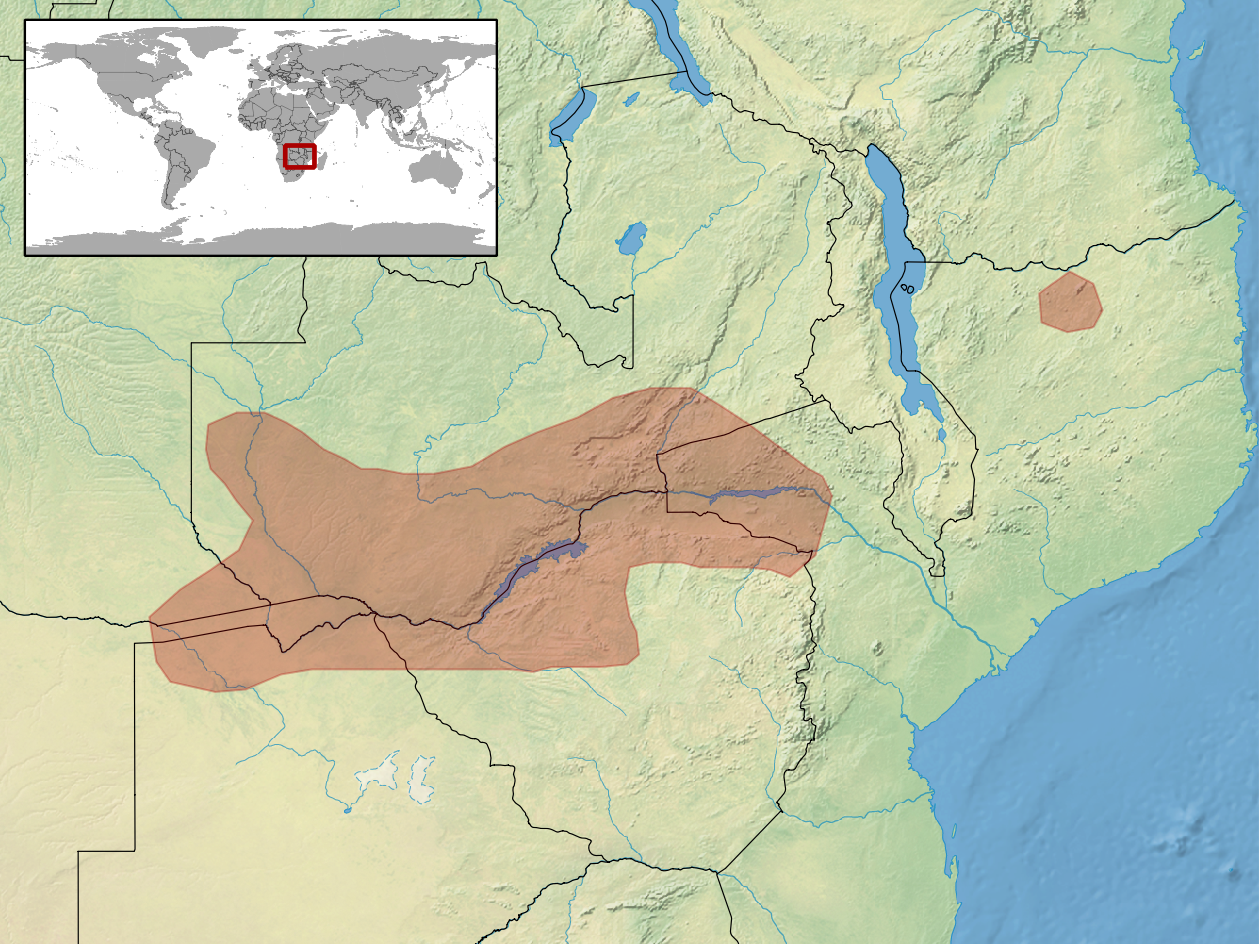

Synonyms
- Lygodactylus picturatus subsp. chobiensis FitzSimons, 1932

= Okavango dwarf gecko =

Species of lizard

The Okavango dwarf gecko or Chobe dwarf gecko (Lygodactylus chobiensis) is a species of gecko found along the Chobe and Zambesi Rivers and into the Okavango Delta, and into Mozambique, Zimbabwe and Zambia.

== Description ==
A large dwarf gecko (normally 25–30 mm in snout–vent length) with males being slightly larger than the females. It has a blue-grey back covered with large pale spots and a yellow belly. The male throat may be black or pale yellow and has two dark chevrons.

They mature at around 9 months and have a lifespan of 18 months.

== Habitat ==
The Okavango dwarf gecko is normally arboreal and can found on tree trunks and sometimes buildings of the tropical savanna and flooded grasslands. It prefers to forage high up in trees and can often be found on acacia, baobab and mopane trees.

== Diet ==
Their diet is mainly ants and termites.

== Reproduction ==
Reproduction occurs throughout the year and two hard-shelled eggs (5 × 6.5 mm) are laid every 8 weeks beneath the tree bark or in disused termite mound. The eggs hatch in about 125 days and the young geckos are about 30 mm in length.
