= Dalophia angolensis =

Scientific classification
- Kingdom: Animalia
- Phylum: Chordata
- Class: Reptilia
- Order: Squamata
- Clade: Amphisbaenia
- Family: Amphisbaenidae
- Genus: Dalophia
- Species: D. angolensis

Binomial name
- Dalophia angolensis Gans, 1976

Species of amphisbaenian

Dalophia angolensis is a species of amphisbaenian in the family Amphisbaenidae. The species is native to southern Africa.

== Geographic range ==
D. angolensis is found in Angola and Zambia.
