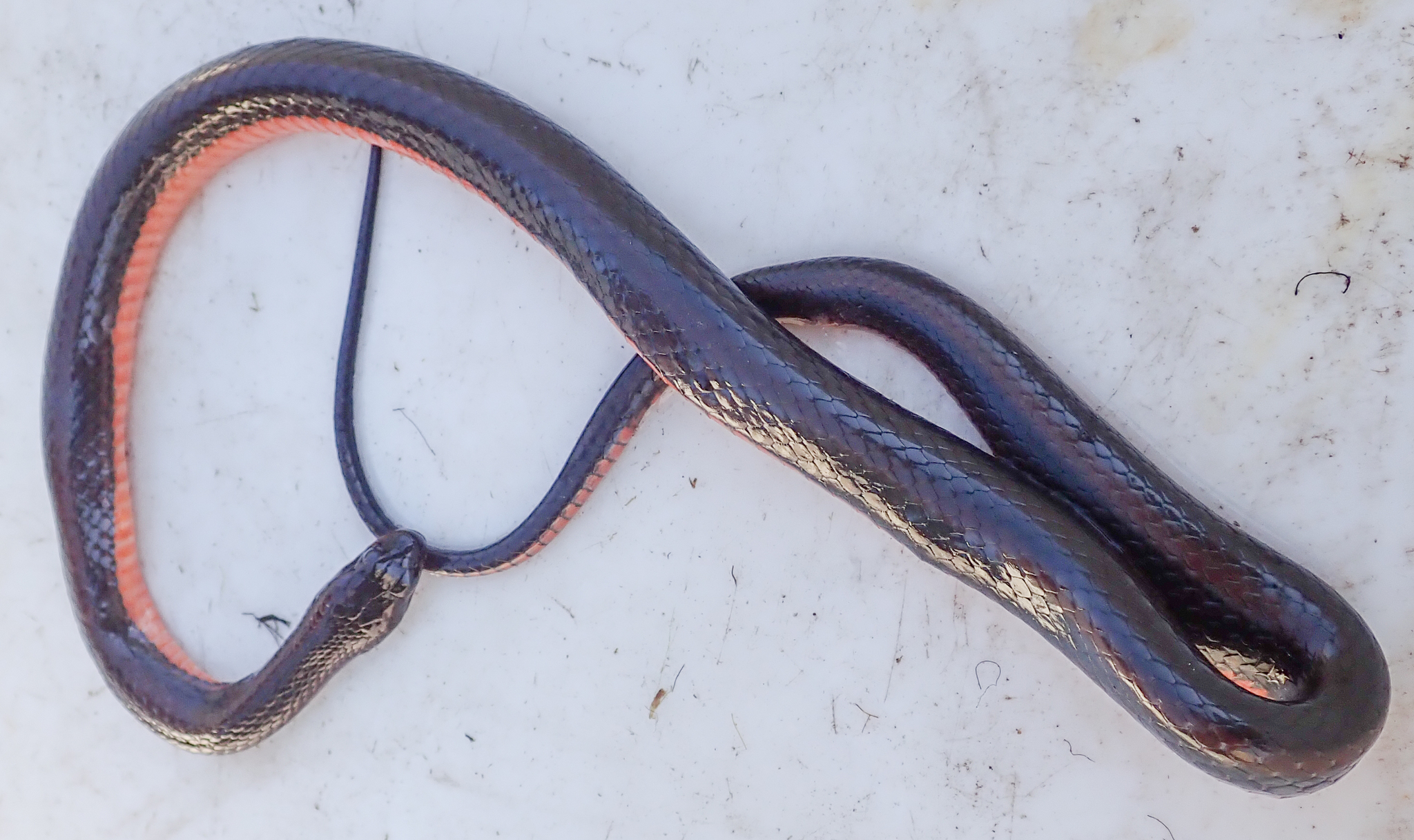

Conservation status
- Least Concern (IUCN 3.1)

Scientific classification
- Kingdom: Animalia
- Phylum: Chordata
- Class: Reptilia
- Order: Squamata
- Suborder: Serpentes
- Family: Colubridae
- Genus: Limnophis
- Species: L. bangweolicus

Binomial name
- Limnophis bangweolicus (Mertens, 1936)

= Limnophis bangweolicus =

Species of snake

Limnophis bangweolicus, the eastern striped swamp snake or Bangweulu water snake, is a species of natricine snake found in Zambia, the Democratic Republic of the Congo, Angola, and Botswana.
