= Sepsina copei =

Conservation status
- Least Concern (IUCN 3.1)

Scientific classification
- Kingdom: Animalia
- Phylum: Chordata
- Class: Reptilia
- Order: Squamata
- Family: Scincidae
- Genus: Sepsina
- Species: S. copei

Binomial name
- Sepsina copei Bocage, 1873

Species of reptile

Sepsina copei, also known commonly as Cope's reduced-limb skink or the sepsina skink, is a species of lizard in the family Scincidae. The species is endemic to Angola.

== Etymology ==
The specific name, copei, is in honor of American herpetologist and paleontologist Edward Drinker Cope.

== Habitat ==
The preferred natural habitat of S. copei is savanna, at altitudes from sea level to 600 m (2,000 ft).

== Description ==
S. copei may attain a snout-to-vent length (SVL) of 8 cm (3.1 in), and a tail length of 5 cm (2.0 in). The eye is small, and the lower eyelid is transparent. It has very short legs, with three toes on each foot. Dorsally, it is pale brown. Ventrally, it is whitish.

== Behavior ==
S. copei is terrestrial and fossorial.

== Reproduction ==
S. copei is viviparous.
