= Hemidactylus faustus =

Scientific classification
- Kingdom: Animalia
- Phylum: Chordata
- Class: Reptilia
- Order: Squamata
- Suborder: Gekkota
- Family: Gekkonidae
- Genus: Hemidactylus
- Species: H. faustus

Binomial name
- Hemidactylus faustus Lobón-Rovira, Conradie, Iglesias, Ernst, Veríssimo, Baptista, & Pinto, 2021

Species of lizard

Hemidactylus faustus is a species of gecko. It is endemic to Angola.
