= Dalophia welwitschii =

Conservation status
- Data Deficient (IUCN 3.1)

Scientific classification
- Kingdom: Animalia
- Phylum: Chordata
- Class: Reptilia
- Order: Squamata
- Clade: Amphisbaenia
- Family: Amphisbaenidae
- Genus: Dalophia
- Species: D. welwitschii

Binomial name
- Dalophia welwitschii Gray, 1865

Synonyms
- Dalophia welwitschii Gray, 1865; Monopeltis welwitschii — Boulenger, 1885; Dalophia welwitschii — Branch et al., 2019

Species of amphisbaenian

Dalophia welwitschii is a species of amphisbaenian in the family Amphisbaenidae. The species is endemic to Angola.

== Etymology ==
The specific name, welwitschii, is in honor of Austrian botanist Friedrich Martin Josef Welwitsch.

== Habitat ==
The preferred natural habitat of D. welwitschii is savanna, at altitudes of 900–1,100 m (3,000–3,600 ft).

== Description ==
D. welwitschii may attain a snout-to-vent length of 26.5 cm (10.4 in), with a tail 2.4 cm (0.94 in) long, and a body diameter of 0.6 cm (0.24 in).
