= Limnophis branchi =

Scientific classification
- Kingdom: Animalia
- Phylum: Chordata
- Order: Squamata
- Suborder: Serpentes
- Family: Colubridae
- Genus: Limnophis
- Species: L. branchi

Binomial name
- Limnophis branchi Conradie, Deepak, Keates, & Gower, 2020

Species of snake

Limnophis branchi is a species of natricine snake found in Angola. The species is named in honor of herpetologist William Roy Branch.
