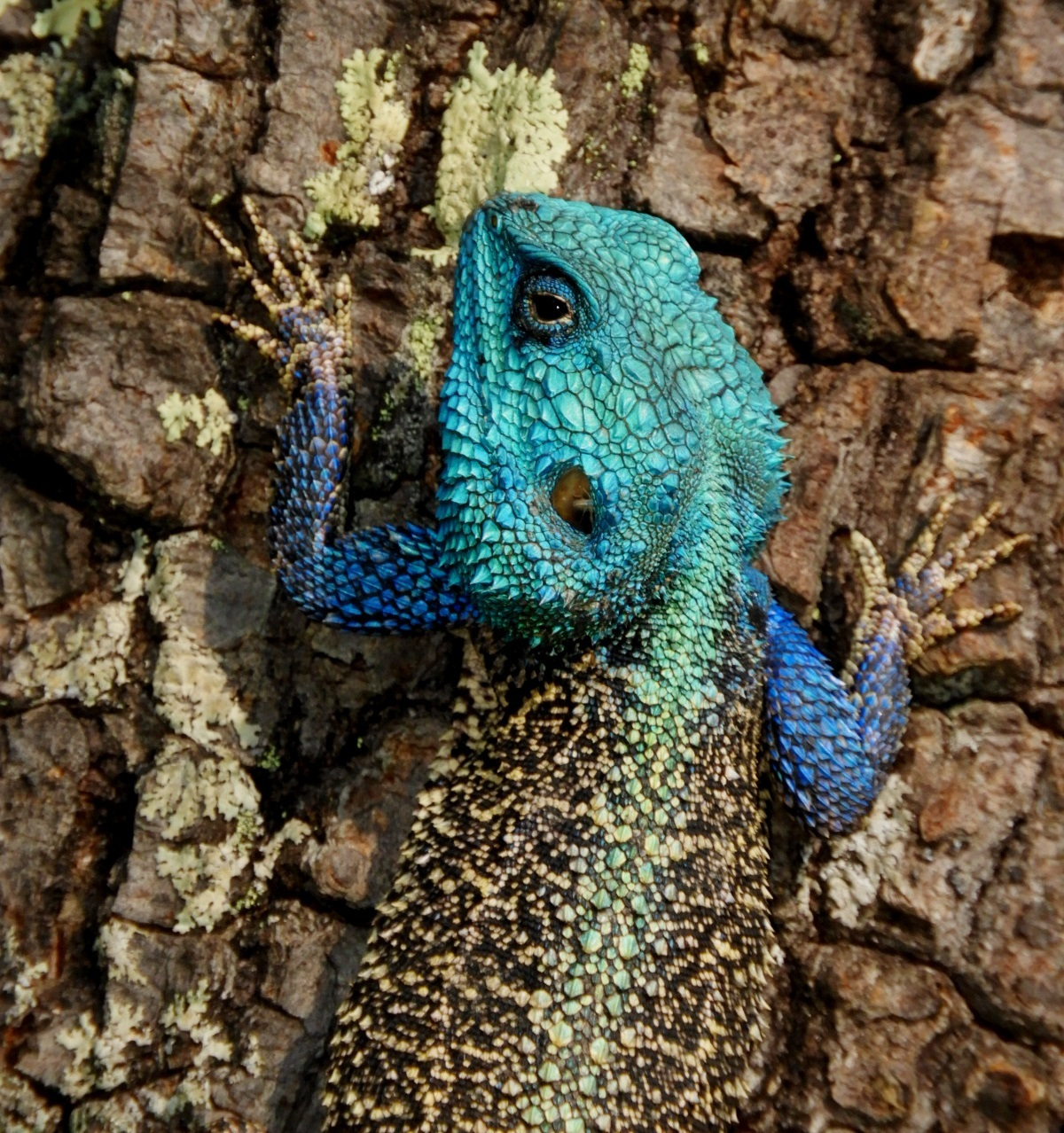

Conservation status
- Least Concern (IUCN 3.1)

Scientific classification
- Kingdom: Animalia
- Phylum: Chordata
- Class: Reptilia
- Order: Squamata
- Suborder: Iguania
- Family: Agamidae
- Genus: Acanthocercus
- Species: A. cyanocephalus

Binomial name
- Acanthocercus cyanocephalus (Falk, 1925)

= Acanthocercus cyanocephalus =

Species of lizard

Acanthocercus cyanocephalus, also commonly known as Falk's blue-headed tree agama, is a species of lizards in the family Agamidae. It can be found in Angola, Namibia, Zambia, and the Democratic Republic of the Congo. With a maximum length of up to 350 millimeters, the tree agama is large in its genus; however, its tail is small when compared with its size. Male lizards, with their blue heads, spotted bodies, and multipatterned tails, are clearly distinct from all other species. Blue-headed tree agamas are known to eat arthropods including spiders, caterpillars, ants, and termites.
