= Bradfield's dwarf gecko =

Scientific classification
- Kingdom: Animalia
- Phylum: Chordata
- Class: Reptilia
- Order: Squamata
- Suborder: Gekkota
- Family: Gekkonidae
- Genus: Lygodactylus
- Species: L. bradfieldi

Binomial name
- Lygodactylus bradfieldi Hewitt, 1932

Synonyms
- Lygodactylus bradfieldi Hewitt, 1932; Lygodactylus capensis ngamiensis V. FitzSimons, 1932; Lygodactylus capensis bradfieldi — Auerbach, 1987; Lygodactylus bradfieldi — Kluge, 1993

Species of lizard

Bradfield's dwarf gecko (Lygodactylus bradfieldi) is a species of gecko, a lizard in the family Gekkonidae. The species is endemic to Southern Africa.

== Geographic range ==
L. bradfieldi is native to southern Angola, Zimbabwe, Botswana, and the Republic of South Africa.

== Etymology ==
The specific name, bradfieldi, is in honor of R.D. Bradfield (1882–1949), who was a South African farmer and naturalist.

== Habitat ==
The preferred natural habitats of L. bradfieldi are desert and savanna.

== Description ==
L. bradfieldi may attain a snout-to-vent length of 3 cm (1.2 in). Dorsally, it is grayish brown, with white and black stripes. Ventrally, it is cream-colored.

== Reproduction ==
L. bradfieldi is oviparous.
