= Hemidactylus longicephalus =

Scientific classification
- Domain: Eukaryota
- Kingdom: Animalia
- Phylum: Chordata
- Class: Reptilia
- Order: Squamata
- Infraorder: Gekkota
- Family: Gekkonidae
- Genus: Hemidactylus
- Species: H. longicephalus

Binomial name
- Hemidactylus longicephalus Bocage, 1873

Synonyms
- Hemidactylus longiceps; Hemidactylus bocagii; Hemidactylus hecqui; Hemidactylus steindachneri; Hemidactylus heequi; Hemidactylus mabouia var. molleri

Species of lizard

Hemidactylus longicephalus is a species of gecko. It is found in Central Africa (Angola, Cameroon, São Tomé and Príncipe, the Democratic Republic of the Congo, and the Central African Republic), Namibia, and possibly Tanzania.
