= Cordylus momboloensis =

Scientific classification
- Kingdom: Animalia
- Phylum: Chordata
- Class: Reptilia
- Order: Squamata
- Family: Cordylidae
- Genus: Cordylus
- Species: C. momboloensis

Binomial name
- Cordylus momboloensis Bates, Lobón-Rovira, Stanley, Branch & Vaz Pinto, 2023

Species of girdled lizard endemic to Angola

Cordylus momboloensis, also known as the Mombolo girdled lizard, is a species of girdled lizard in the family Cordylidae, endemic to the west-central highlands of Angola.

== Taxonomy and discovery ==
Cordylus momboloensis was described in 2023 following phylogenetic and morphological studies of Angolan highland Cordylus populations. It was distinguished from the closely related Cordylus angolensis by genetic divergence and a combination of morphological traits, including coloration, scalation, and eye color. The species name refers to the Maca Mombolo commune in South Kwanza, one of its known localities.

== Distribution and habitat ==
Cordylus momboloensis is known from rocky outcrops and highland habitats in the Mombolo region and surrounding areas of west-central Angola, including Taqueta Mountain (west of Caconda), Monte Verde (Sandula, ‘Mombolo’), and Uassamba (Vondo). The species is allopatric with C. angolensis and appears restricted to isolated highland inselbergs and rock formations.
