= Acanthocercus margaritae =

Scientific classification
- Kingdom: Animalia
- Phylum: Chordata
- Class: Reptilia
- Order: Squamata
- Suborder: Iguania
- Family: Agamidae
- Genus: Acanthocercus
- Species: A. margaritae

Binomial name
- Acanthocercus margaritae Wagner, Butler, Ceriaco, & Bauer, 2021

Species of lizard

Acanthocercus margaritae, is a species of lizard in the family Agamidae. It is a small lizard found in Namibia and Angola.
