= Hemidactylus benguellensis =

Scientific classification
- Domain: Eukaryota
- Kingdom: Animalia
- Phylum: Chordata
- Class: Reptilia
- Order: Squamata
- Infraorder: Gekkota
- Family: Gekkonidae
- Genus: Hemidactylus
- Species: H. benguellensis

Binomial name
- Hemidactylus benguellensis Bocage, 1893

Species of lizard

The Benguela house gecko (Hemidactylus benguellensis) is a species of gecko. It is endemic to Angola and Namibia.
