= Bicolored swamp snake =

Conservation status
- Least Concern (IUCN 3.1)

Scientific classification
- Kingdom: Animalia
- Phylum: Chordata
- Class: Reptilia
- Order: Squamata
- Suborder: Serpentes
- Family: Colubridae
- Genus: Limnophis
- Species: L. bicolor

Binomial name
- Limnophis bicolor Günther, 1865

Synonyms
- Glypholycus bicolor Witte, 1933

Species of snake

The bicolored swamp snake also known as the striped swamp snake (Limnophis bicolor) is a species of African venomous snake. It is the type species of the genus Limnophis. Its back is black with a white underbelly.

== Distribution ==
This species is found in the southwest of Angola, northern Botswana, eastern and southern Democratic Republic of Congo, southern Zambia (in the basins of the Okavango and Zambezi), and Zimbabwe.

== Subspecies ==
The variety or subspecies Limnophis bicolor bangweolicus (Mertens, 1936) has been elevated to full species rank as Limnophis bangweolicus.
