= Lawrence's dwarf gecko =

Conservation status
- Least Concern (IUCN 3.1)

Scientific classification
- Kingdom: Animalia
- Phylum: Chordata
- Class: Reptilia
- Order: Squamata
- Suborder: Gekkota
- Family: Gekkonidae
- Genus: Lygodactylus
- Species: L. lawrencei

Binomial name
- Lygodactylus lawrencei Hewitt, 1926

Synonyms
- Lygodactylus lawrencei Hewitt, 1926; Lygodactylus picturatus lawrencei — Loveridge, 1947; Lygodactylus lawrencei — Wermuth, 1965; Lygodactylus (Lygodactylus) lawrencei — Rösler, 2000

Species of lizard

Lawrence's dwarf gecko (Lygodactylus lawrencei) is a species of lizard in the family Gekkonidae. The species is native to Southern Africa.

== Etymology ==
The specific name, lawrencei, is in honor of South African entomologist Reginald Frederick Lawrence.

== Geographic range ==
L. lawrencei is found in southern Angola, and adjacent northern Namibia.

== Description ==
L. lawrencei is a small species. The snout-to-vent length (SVL) of adults is 30–32 mm (1.2–1.3 in). Dorsally, it is ashy-gray with many thin broken dark stripes. Ventrally, it is white.

== Habitat ==
The preferred habitat of L. lawrencei is rocky, dry savanna and shrubland, at altitudes of 100–1,500 m (330–4,920 ft).

== Reproduction ==
L. lawrencei is oviparous.
