= Sepsina angolensis =

Conservation status
- Least Concern (IUCN 3.1)

Scientific classification
- Kingdom: Animalia
- Phylum: Chordata
- Class: Reptilia
- Order: Squamata
- Suborder: Scinciformata
- Infraorder: Scincomorpha
- Family: Scincidae
- Genus: Sepsina
- Species: S. angolensis

Binomial name
- Sepsina angolensis Bocage, 1866

Species of reptile

Sepsina angolensis, the Angola skink, is a species of lizard which is found in Namibia, Angola, Zambia, and Democratic Republic of the Congo.
