= Dalophia ellenbergeri =

Conservation status
- Least Concern (IUCN 3.1)

Scientific classification
- Kingdom: Animalia
- Phylum: Chordata
- Class: Reptilia
- Order: Squamata
- Clade: Amphisbaenia
- Family: Amphisbaenidae
- Genus: Dalophia
- Species: D. ellenbergeri

Binomial name
- Dalophia ellenbergeri (Angel, 1920)

Synonyms
- Monopeltis llenbergeri Angel, 1920; Dalophia ellenbergeri — Broadley, Gans & Visser, 1976; Tomuropeltis ellenbergeri — Brygoo, 1990; Dalophia ellenbergeri — Gans, 2005

Species of amphisbaenian

Dalophia ellenbergeri is a species of amphisbaenian in the family Amphisbaenidae. The species is native to southern Africa.

== Etymology ==
The specific name, ellenbergeri, is in honor of Victor Ellenberger (1879–1972), who was an African-born Swiss missionary and naturalist.

== Geographic range ==
D. ellenbergeri is found in Angola and Zambia.

== Habitat ==
The preferred natural habitat of D. ellenbergeri is savanna.

== Behavior ==
D. ellenbergeri is terrestrial and fossorial.

== Reproduction ==
D. ellenbergeri is oviparous.
