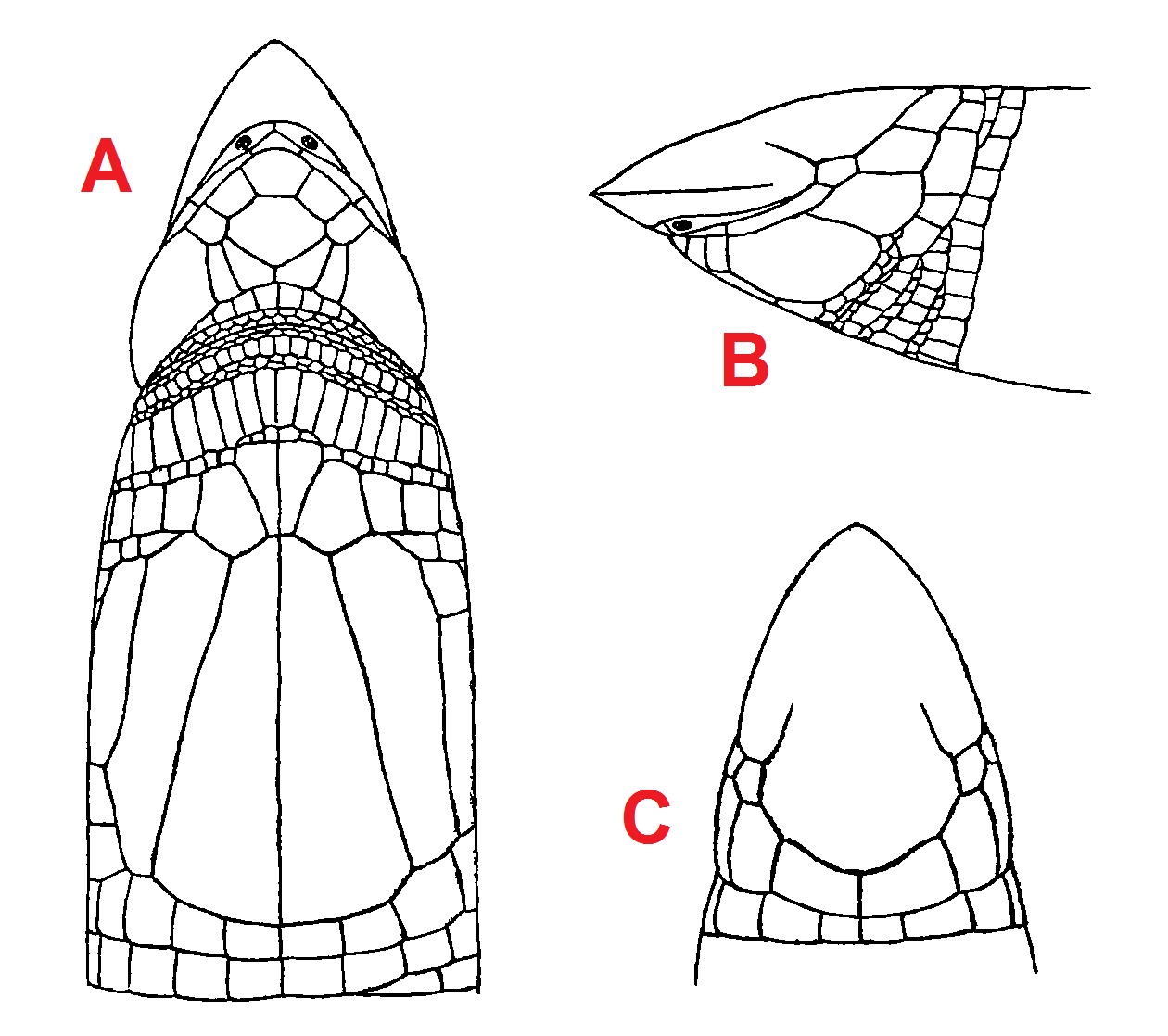

Conservation status
- Least Concern (IUCN 3.1)

Scientific classification
- Kingdom: Animalia
- Phylum: Chordata
- Class: Reptilia
- Order: Squamata
- Clade: Amphisbaenia
- Family: Amphisbaenidae
- Genus: Dalophia
- Species: D. pistillum

Binomial name
- Dalophia pistillum (Boettger, 1895)

= Pestle-tailed worm lizard =

Species of amphisbaenian

The pestle-tailed worm lizard (Dalophia pistillum) is a species of amphisbaenian in the family Amphisbaenidae. The species is indigenous to southern Africa.
