= Kolekanos =

Scientific classification
- Kingdom: Animalia
- Phylum: Chordata
- Class: Reptilia
- Order: Squamata
- Suborder: Gekkota
- Family: Gekkonidae
- Subfamily: Uroplatinae
- Genus: Kolekanos; Heinicke, Daza, Greenbaum, Jackman & Bauer, 2014

Genus of lizards

Kolekanos is a genus of African gecko found in Angola. It contains two species:

- Kolekanos plumicauda Haacke, 2008
- Kolekanos spinicaudus Lobón-Rovira, Conradie, Baptista, & Vaz Pinto, 2022
