= Panaspis breviceps =

Scientific classification
- Kingdom: Animalia
- Phylum: Chordata
- Class: Reptilia
- Order: Squamata
- Family: Scincidae
- Genus: Panaspis
- Species: P. breviceps

Binomial name
- Panaspis breviceps (Peters, 1873)

Species of lizard

Panaspis breviceps, the short-headed snake-eyed skink or Peters's lidless skink, is a species of lidless skinks in the family Scincidae. The species is found in western Africa.
