= Trachylepis hoeschi =

Conservation status
- Least Concern (IUCN 3.1)

Scientific classification
- Kingdom: Animalia
- Phylum: Chordata
- Class: Reptilia
- Order: Squamata
- Family: Scincidae
- Genus: Trachylepis
- Species: T. hoeschi

Binomial name
- Trachylepis hoeschi (Mertens, 1954)

Synonyms
- Mabuya hoeschi Mertens, 1954; Euprepis hoeschi — Mausfeld et al., 2002; Trachylepis hoeschi — Bauer, 2003

Species of lizard

Trachylepis hoeschi, also known commonly as Hoesch's mabuya and Hoesch's skink, is a species of lizard in the subfamily Mabuyinae of the family Scincidae. The species is native to southwestern Africa.

== Etymology ==
The specific name, hoeschi, is in honor of German zoologist Walter Hoesch (1896–1961), who collected the holotype.

== Geographic range ==
T. hoeschi is found in Angola and Namibia.

== Habitat ==
The preferred natural habitat of T. hoeschi is arid savanna, where it is found on boulders and rock outcrops, at altitudes of 10–2,200 m (33–7,218 ft).

== Description ==
Adults of T. hoeschi usually have a snout-to-vent length (SVL) of 5–8 cm (2.0–3.1 in). The maximum recorded SVL is 10 cm (3.9 in). The tail is long, about two times SVL.

Dorsally, T. hoeschi is grayish brown, with transverse bands of dark brown spots. Ventrally, it is white, except for the throat which is yellowish.

== Diet ==
T. hoeschi preys upon insects such as beetles, moths, and wasps.

== Reproduction ==
The mode of reproduction of T. hoeschi is unknown.
