= Acanthocercus ceriacoi =

Scientific classification
- Kingdom: Animalia
- Phylum: Chordata
- Class: Reptilia
- Order: Squamata
- Suborder: Iguania
- Family: Agamidae
- Genus: Acanthocercus
- Species: A. ceriacoi

Binomial name
- Acanthocercus ceriacoi Marques, Parrinha, Santos, Bandeira, Butler, Sousa, Bauer, & Wagner, 2022

Species of lizard

Acanthocercus ceriacoi, or Ceríaco's tree agama, is a species of lizard in the family Agamidae.
