= Hemidactylus nzingae =

Scientific classification
- Domain: Eukaryota
- Kingdom: Animalia
- Phylum: Chordata
- Class: Reptilia
- Order: Squamata
- Infraorder: Gekkota
- Family: Gekkonidae
- Genus: Hemidactylus
- Species: H. nzingae

Binomial name
- Hemidactylus nzingae Ceríaco, Agarwal, Marques, & Bauer, 2020

Species of lizard

Hemidactylus nzingae, also known as the Queen Nzinga's tropical gecko, is a species of house gecko endemic to Angola. It is named after Queen Nzinga of Ndongo and Matamba.
