= Sepsina bayonii =

Conservation status
- Least Concern (IUCN 3.1)

Scientific classification
- Kingdom: Animalia
- Phylum: Chordata
- Class: Reptilia
- Order: Squamata
- Family: Scincidae
- Genus: Sepsina
- Species: S. bayonii

Binomial name
- Sepsina bayonii Bocage, 1866

Synonyms
- Dumerilia bayonii Bocage, 1866; Scincodipus congicus W. Peters, 1875; Sepsina bayonii — Boulenger, 1887

Species of reptile

Sepsina bayonii, also known commonly as Bayon's skink, is a species of lizard in the family Scincidae. The species is native to Central Africa and Southern Africa.

== Etymology ==
The specific name, bayonii, is in honor of Francisco Antonio Pinheiro Bayão, a Portuguese planter in Angola, who collected the holotype.

== Geographic range ==
S. bayonii is found in Angola and in the Democratic Republic of the Congo.

== Habitat ==
The preferred natural habitat of S. bayonii is savanna, at altitudes from sea level to 500 m (1,600 ft).

== Description ==
S. bayonii has no front legs. Each back leg is very small, tapering, and ends in a claw. The largest specimen measured by Boulenger had a snout-to-vent length (SVL) of 7.1 cm (2.8 in), a tail length of 4.4 cm (1.7 in), and a hind leg length of 0.4 cm (0.16 in).

== Behavior ==
S. bayonii burrows in leaf litter and loose sandy soil.

== Reproduction ==
S. bayonii is viviparous.
