= Trachylepis bayonii =

Conservation status
- Least Concern (IUCN 3.1)

Scientific classification
- Kingdom: Animalia
- Phylum: Chordata
- Class: Reptilia
- Order: Squamata
- Family: Scincidae
- Genus: Trachylepis
- Species: T. bayonii

Binomial name
- Trachylepis bayonii (Bocage, 1872)

Synonyms
- Euprepes bayonii Bocage, 1872; Mabuia bayonii — Boulenger, 1887; Mabuya bayoni huilensis Laurent, 1964; Mabuya bayonii — Greer et al., 2000; Trachylepis bayonii — Bauer, 2003

Species of lizard

Trachylepis bayonii, also known commonly as Bayão's skink, Bayon's mabuya, and Bayon's skink, is a species of lizard in the family Scincidae. The species is endemic to Africa. There are two subspecies.

== Etymology ==
The specific name, bayonii, is in honor of Francisco Antonio Pinheiro Bayão, who was a Portuguese planter in Angola.

== Geographic range ==
T. bayonii is found in Angola, Kenya, Tanzania, and Uganda.

== Habitat ==
The preferred natural habitats of T. bayonii are grassland and shrubland, at altitudes of 2,000–3,200 metres (6,560–10,500 ft).

== Reproduction ==
T. bayonii is viviparous.

== Subspecies ==
Two subspecies are recognized as being valid, including the nominotypical subspecies.

- Trachylepis bayonii bayonii (Bocage, 1872)
- Trachylepis bayonii keniensis (Loveridge, 1956)

Nota bene: A trinomial authority in parentheses indicates that the subspecies was originally described in a genus other than Trachylepis.
