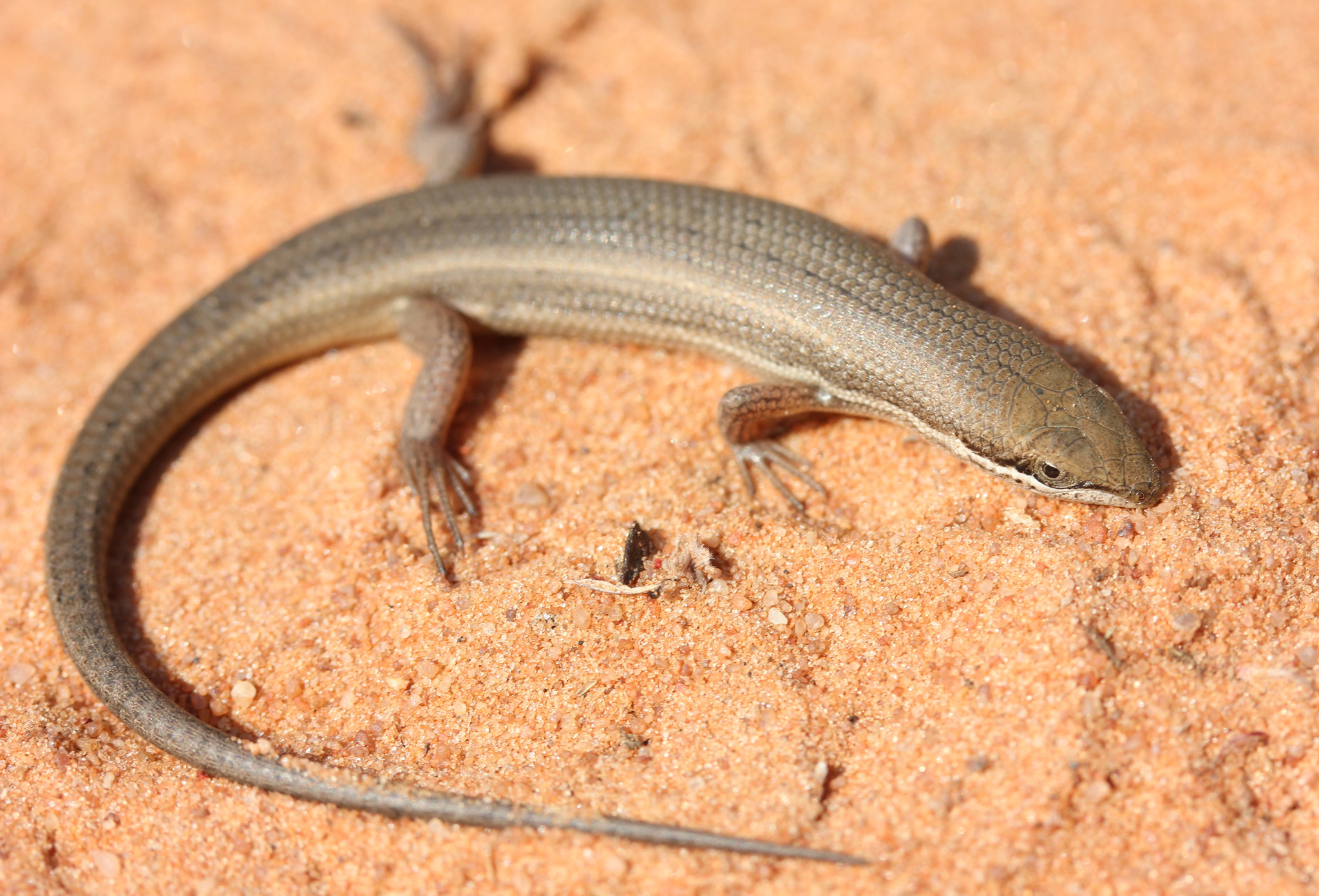

Scientific classification
- Domain: Eukaryota
- Kingdom: Animalia
- Phylum: Chordata
- Class: Reptilia
- Order: Squamata
- Family: Scincidae
- Genus: Trachylepis
- Species: T. punctulata

Binomial name
- Trachylepis punctulata (Bocage, 1872)

= Trachylepis punctulata =

Species of lizard

Trachylepis punctulata, the speckled sand skink or speckled skink, is a species of skink found in southern Africa.
