= Lake Kachera =

Shallow fresh water lake in Uganda

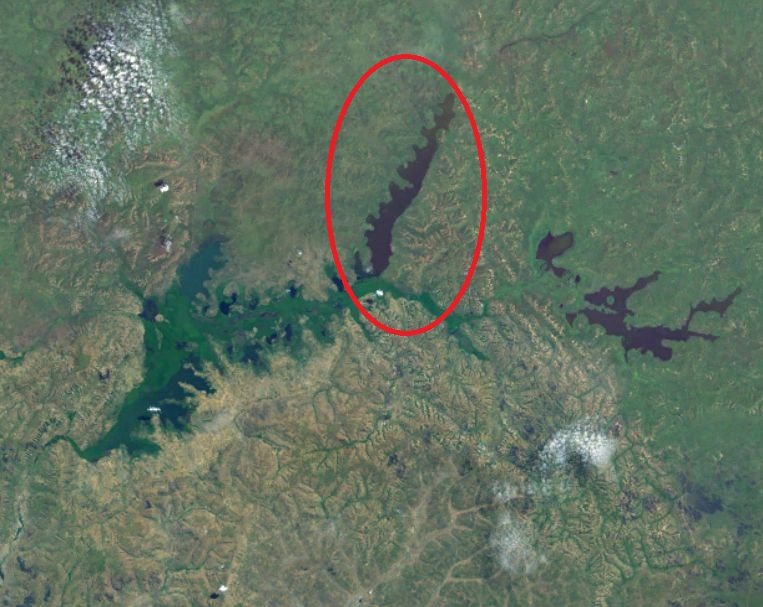
- Satellite map of Lake Kachira
- Interactive map of Lake Kachera
- Location: Rakai District
- Coordinates: 0°35′42″S 31°06′54″E
- Type: Fresh water
- Part of: Lake Victoria basin
- Primary inflows: River Rwizi
- Primary outflows: Kagera River
- Basin countries: Uganda
- Max. length: 20 km (12 mi)
- Max. width: 3.5 km (2.2 mi)
- Surface area: 42 km^{2} (16 sq mi)

Lake Kachera is also known as Lake Kachira, Lake Kacheera, Lake Kakyera and Lake Kachra is a shallow fresh water lake that is located in Rakai district and Mbarara district in Uganda. It is a part of the Mburo-Nakivale wetland system and also a part of the complex system of lakes known as Koki lakes that are separated by vast swamps. It is also one of the lakes that make the Victoria satellite lakes.

== Location ==
Lake Kachera is located in Mbarara district in the Western part of Uganda. Lake Kachera is located at coordinates 0.595°S 31.115°E. Lake Kachera is located at an altitude of 1,232 metres (4,042 feet) above sea level. It is located near Lake Mburo National Park.

Lake Kachera is a part of the Koki Lakes system of lakes that are separated from Lake Victoria by an extension of vast swamps, and it is also one of the lakes that make the Victoria satellite lakes. The Koki Lakes consist of Lake Kachera, Lake Mburo, Lake Kijanebalola and Lake Nakivali.

== Geography and formation ==
After the 1997 El Niño event, Lake Kacheera lost most of its waters to Lake Victoria due to a massive water flow via Lake Kijjanebarora and its level fell by 3 metres. Lake Kachera also lost its floating island that used to be a refugium for the fish. Its shores are covered with swamps, thickets and woodlands.

Lake Kachera is a shallow lake with an average depth of 5 metres (16 feet) and also cover an area of 42 square kilometres (16 square miles) and a shoreline of 81 km. It has a maximum length of 20 kilometres (12 miles) and width of 3.5 kilometres (2.2 miles).

River Ruizi flows from the Bushenyi district and passes through Lake Kachera and Lake Kijanebalola before it enters into Lake Mburo and ending in Lake Victoria. It drains it waters into Lake Victoria via Kagera River which is its only river out flow.

River Rwizi also pours its water into Lake Victoria through Lake Kachera which is a drainage system for Lake Victoria.

== Ecology ==
Lake Kachera has different species of birds, fish, plants and animals.

=== Fish species ===
Lake Kachera has different species of fish that include; the Nile tilapia, Oreochromis esculentus, (locally known as engege), and Astatoreochromis, Astatotilapia, Clarias, Haragachromis, and Protopterus species.

Lake Kachera has native non-cichlid fish that include; Clarias gariepinus, Clarias liocephalus, and Protopterus aethiopicus.

=== Plant species ===
Lake Kachera's shoreline vegetation has Cyperus papyrus, Cyperus esculentus, Phragmites mauritianus, some forest, and banana plantations.

==== Algal species ====
Lake Kachera has a total of 47 taxa including; Cyanophyta (17), Chlorophyta (19), Bacillariophyta (5), Euglenophyta (3), Pyrrophyta (1), Chrysophyta (1), and Cryptophyta (1).

=== Animal species ===
==== Zooplankton ====
Lake Kachera has 22 zooplankton taxa. There are representatives of the Diplostraca; Ceriodaphnia cornuta, Moina micrura, Eucyclops, Mesocyclops, Toronaeus incisus, and Toronaeus neglectus, and the Rotifera, including; Asplanchna, Brachionus angularis, Brachionus bidentatus, Brachionus budapestinensis, Brachionus quadridentatus, Brachionus calyciflorus, Brachionus falcatus, Brachionus patulus, Filinia longiseta, Filinia opoliensis, Hexarthra, Keratella tropica, Lecane bulla, Polyarthra vulgaris, Synchaeta pectinata, and Trichocerca cylindrica.

==== Amphibians ====
Lake Kachera has 8 species of amphibians that include; Bufo gutturalis (guttural toad), Hyperolius acuticeps (sharp-nosed reed frog), Hyperolius kivuensis kivuensis (Kivu reed frog), Hyperolius viridiflavus bayoni, and Hyperolius viridiflavus viridiflavus (common reed frog), Phrynobatrachus natalensis (Natal dwarf puddle frog), Ptychadena mascareniensis (Mascarene grassland frog), Ptychadena oxyrhynchus (Kaffirland grassland frog), Ptychadena porissisima (Ethiopia grassland frog), and Xenopus victorianus (Lake Victoria clawed frog).

==== Reptiles ====
Lake Kachera has 7 species of reptiles that include; Agama atricollis (common tree agama), Cocodylus niloticus (Nile crocodile), Mabuya maculilabris (speckle-lipped skink), Mabuya striata (common striped skink), Naja melanoleuca (water cobra), Python sebae (rock python), and Varanus niloticus (Nile monitor).

==== Mammals ====
Lake Kachera has 5 species of mammals that include; Atilax paludinosus (marsh mongoose), Hippopotamus amphibius (hippopotamus), Lophuromys sikapusi (common brush-furred bat), Lutra maculicollis (spot-necked otter), and Praomys jacksoni (Jackson's soft-furred rat).

== Economic and human activities ==
Fishing, Fish processing, tourism, agriculture, livestock keeping, Mixed farming are some of the economic activities that are carried out around Lake Kachera.

== Conservation ==
Rakai district authorities campaign for sustainable fishing by giving fishermen guidelines and making new rules and regulations such restricting fishing on some landing sites, arresting those who participate in illegal fishing activities by through water and land patrols and also partnering with the Uganda government agencies and fishing community organizations (BMU).

From 2017 to 2020, National Environment Management Authority of Uganda (NEMA) restored 200 hactres of the degraded Lake Kachera shoreline wetland ecosystem in Kiruhura district through buffer zone demarcation, tree planting and removal of illegal structures in the buffer zones, and community sensitization on ecosystem management.

== See also ==
- Lake Kyoga
- Lake Kijanebalola
- Lake Nakivali
