= Black-necked agama =

There are three species of lizard native to Africa named black-necked agama:

- Acanthocercus atricollis
- Acanthocercus gregorii
- Acanthocercus minutus
