= Blue-headed tree agama =

There are three species of lizard native to Africa named blue-headed tree agama:

- Acanthocercus atricollis
- Acanthocercus gregorii
- Acanthocercus minutus
