= Southern tree agama =

There are three species of lizard native to Africa named southern tree agama:

- Acanthocercus atricollis
- Acanthocercus gregorii
- Acanthocercus minutus
