= Blue-throated agama =

There are three species of lizard native to Africa named blue-throated agama:

- Acanthocercus atricollis
- Acanthocercus gregorii
- Acanthocercus minutus
