= Haplo =

Haplo may refer to:

- Haplogroup

== Fish ==
- Haplo (fish), a common name for many fish classified in the tribe Haplochromini
  - Giant haplo
  - Bluelip haplo
  - Ncheni haplo

== See also ==
- Ploidy
- The Death Gate Cycle
