= Lake Kijanebalola =

Ugandan freshwater lake

- Location within Uganda
- Location: Rakai District, Uganda
- Coordinates: 0.71714°S 31.329403°E
- Part of: Lake Victoria basin
- Basin countries: Uganda

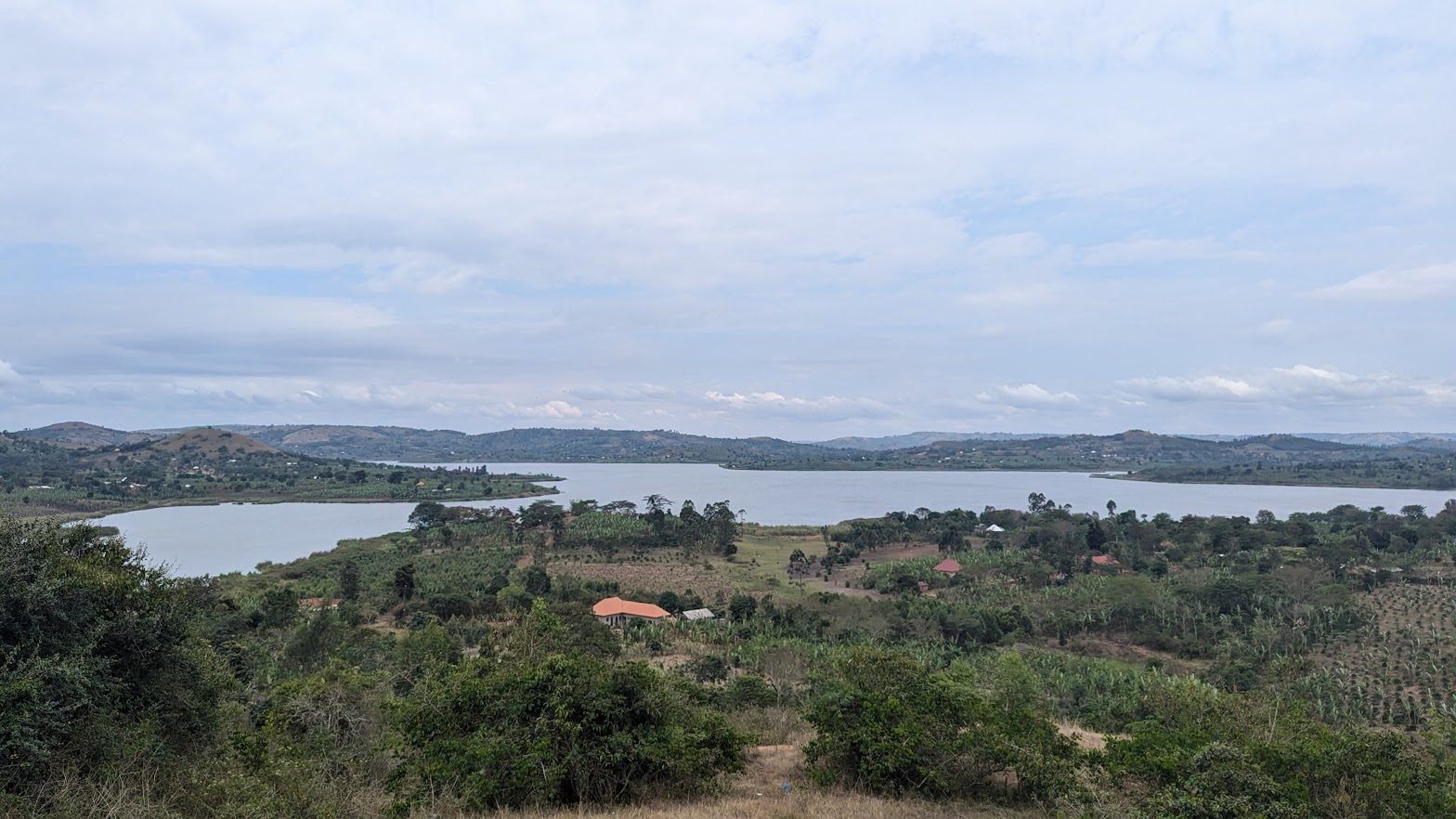
Lake Kijanebalora

Lake Kijanebalola, also known as Lake Kijanebarola or Lake Kijjanebalola, is a freshwater lake located in Koki county, Kyalulangira sub-county, Rakai District, Central Uganda. Spanning an area of around 14 square kilometers, it contains Kisozi Island and Kinoni Island. The lake is surrounded by populated places such as Lugando, Kisomole, Gombe, Lukondo, Kayonza, Buyanda and Dwaniro.

== Geography and hydrology ==
Lake Kijanebalola is located at 0.71714°S 31.329403°E, situated at approximately 1,200 meters above sea level. The depth of the lake fluctuates, maintaining an average of roughly 4 meters. The lake is surrounded by various regions, among them being Kyarurangira, Ddyango Town Council, Ddwaniro, Kagamba, Kibaale, Kibanda, Lwamaggwa, and Rakai Town Council. The lake's water system includes connections to Lake Kacheera and the Kagera River, which ultimately flow into Lake Victoria.

== Ecological and economic significance ==
The lake is a haven to a diverse ecosystem, comprising various fish species which are significant for the nearby area's fishing practices. The adjacent wetlands and shoreline provide habitat for a multitude of plant and animal life forms. In terms of economics, the lake is a fundamental component of the local communities' income, facilitating activities such as fishing, agriculture, and animal husbandry.

== Environmental challenges ==
Lake Kijanebalola is currently encountering a series of environmental challenges. It has been observed to exhibit occurrences of invasive green algae, which have significantly curtailed fishing operations and had a notable impact on the lake's water quality. This phenomenon of excessive algal growth is largely attributed to the presence of pollutants, specifically those derived from agricultural sources, which introduce heightened levels of nitrogen and phosphorus into the aquatic ecosystem. In 2022, it was also reported that lake had dramatically dried up which led to several economic and environmental setbacks with a similar incident having occurred in 1997. The lake has also undergone instances of desiccation, with a particularly notable event occurring in May 2021. This has resulted in substantial fish mortality and has had consequential effects on the economic well-being of the local fishing community. The lake has experienced multiple instances of overflow, resulting in the inundation of nearby roads and the displacement of residents. The most substantial of these events took place in December 2022, which caused fatalities and noteworthy damage to property.

== Conservation efforts ==
Efforts are currently in progress to tackle the issues. Both local governments and national entities have launched initiatives to advocate for sustainable fishing methods and control the spread of invasive species. Additionally, there are continuous projects focused on rehabilitating the lake's ecosystem and guaranteeing the responsible utilization of its resources.

== Cultural and historical significance ==
Lake Kijanebalola holds cultural significance for the local communities. It is an integral aspect of the Kooki Cultural Institution's historical background and customs. In addition to its economic role, the lake frequently appears in local folklore, which underscores its broader significance beyond mere economic utility.

== See also ==
- Lake Nakivali
- Lake Kyoga
- Lake Kachera
