= Astatoreochromis vanderhorsti =

Conservation status
- Least Concern (IUCN 3.1)

Scientific classification
- Kingdom: Animalia
- Phylum: Chordata
- Class: Actinopterygii
- Order: Cichliformes
- Family: Cichlidae
- Genus: Astatoreochromis
- Species: A. vanderhorsti

Binomial name
- Astatoreochromis vanderhorsti (Greenwood, 1954)

Species of fish

Astatoreochromis vanderhorsti is a species of fish in the family Cichlidae. It is found in Burundi and Tanzania. Its natural habitat is rivers. Although often recognized as a valid species, it is likely a synonym of A. straeleni. The specific name honours the Dutch-South African zoologist Cornelius van der Horst (1889–1951).
