= Toronaeus sumptuosus =

Scientific classification
- Kingdom: Animalia
- Phylum: Arthropoda
- Class: Insecta
- Order: Coleoptera
- Suborder: Polyphaga
- Infraorder: Cucujiformia
- Family: Cerambycidae
- Genus: Toronaeus
- Species: T. sumptuosus

Binomial name
- Toronaeus sumptuosus Lane, 1973

Species of beetle

Toronaeus sumptuosus is a species of beetle in the family Cerambycidae. It was described by Lane in 1973.
