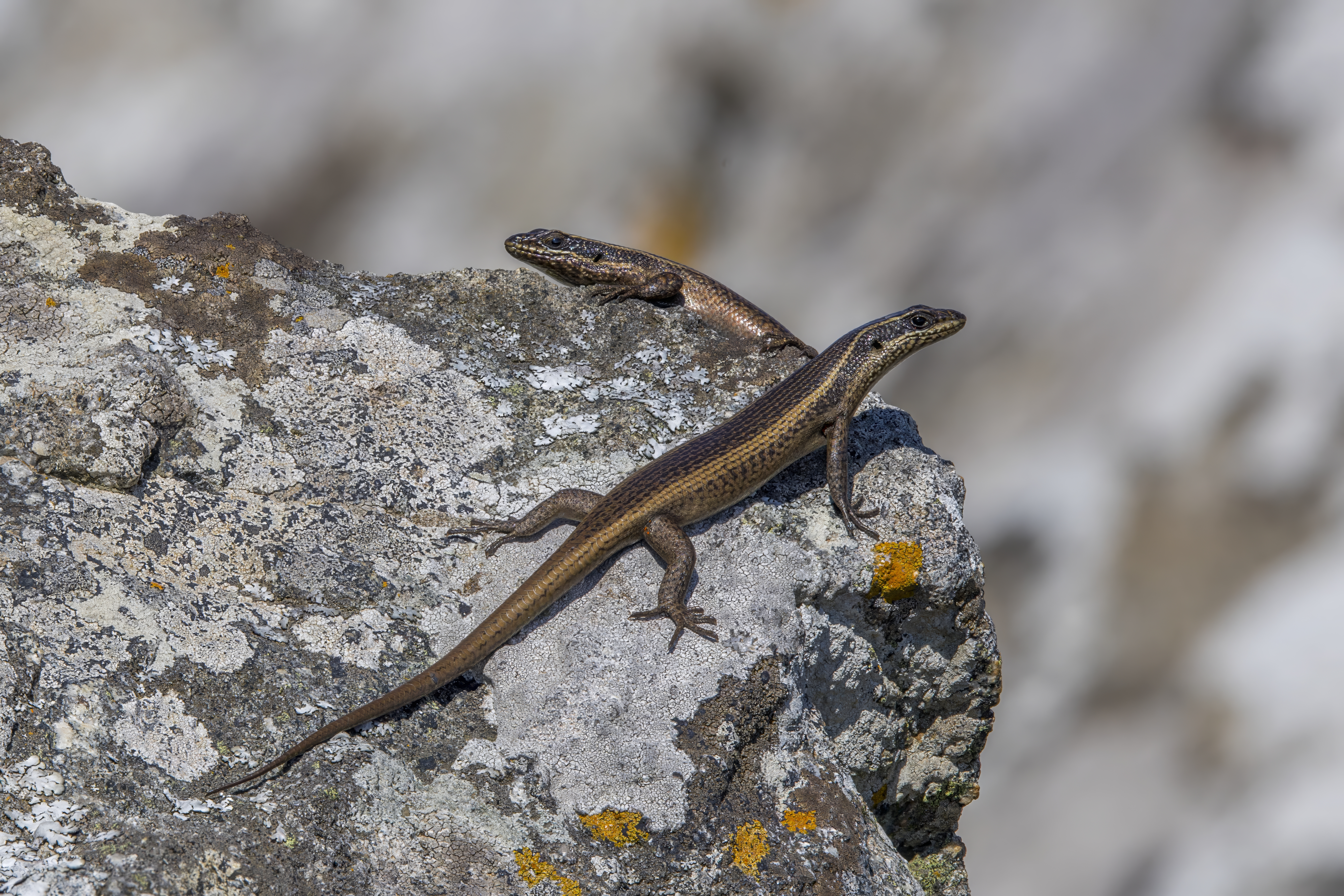
- in Eswatini

Scientific classification
- Kingdom: Animalia
- Phylum: Chordata
- Class: Reptilia
- Order: Squamata
- Family: Scincidae
- Genus: Trachylepis
- Species: T. striata

Binomial name
- Trachylepis striata (W. Peters, 1844)

Synonyms
- List: Tropidolepisma striatum W. Peters, 1844; Mabuia striata — Boulenger, 1895; Mabuya striata — V. FitzSimons & Brain, 1958; Euprepes striata — Mausfeld et al., 2002; Trachylepis striata — Bauer, 2003

= Trachylepis striata =

African striped skink

Species of lizard

The African striped skink (Trachylepis striata), commonly called the striped skink, is a species of lizard in the skink family (Scincidae). The species is widespread in East Africa and Southern Africa. It is not a close relation to the Australian striped skink, Ctenotus taeniolatus.

== Taxonomy ==
Former subspecies T. s. punctatissima, T. s. sparsa, and T. s. wahlbergii have been elevated to species level.

== Description ==
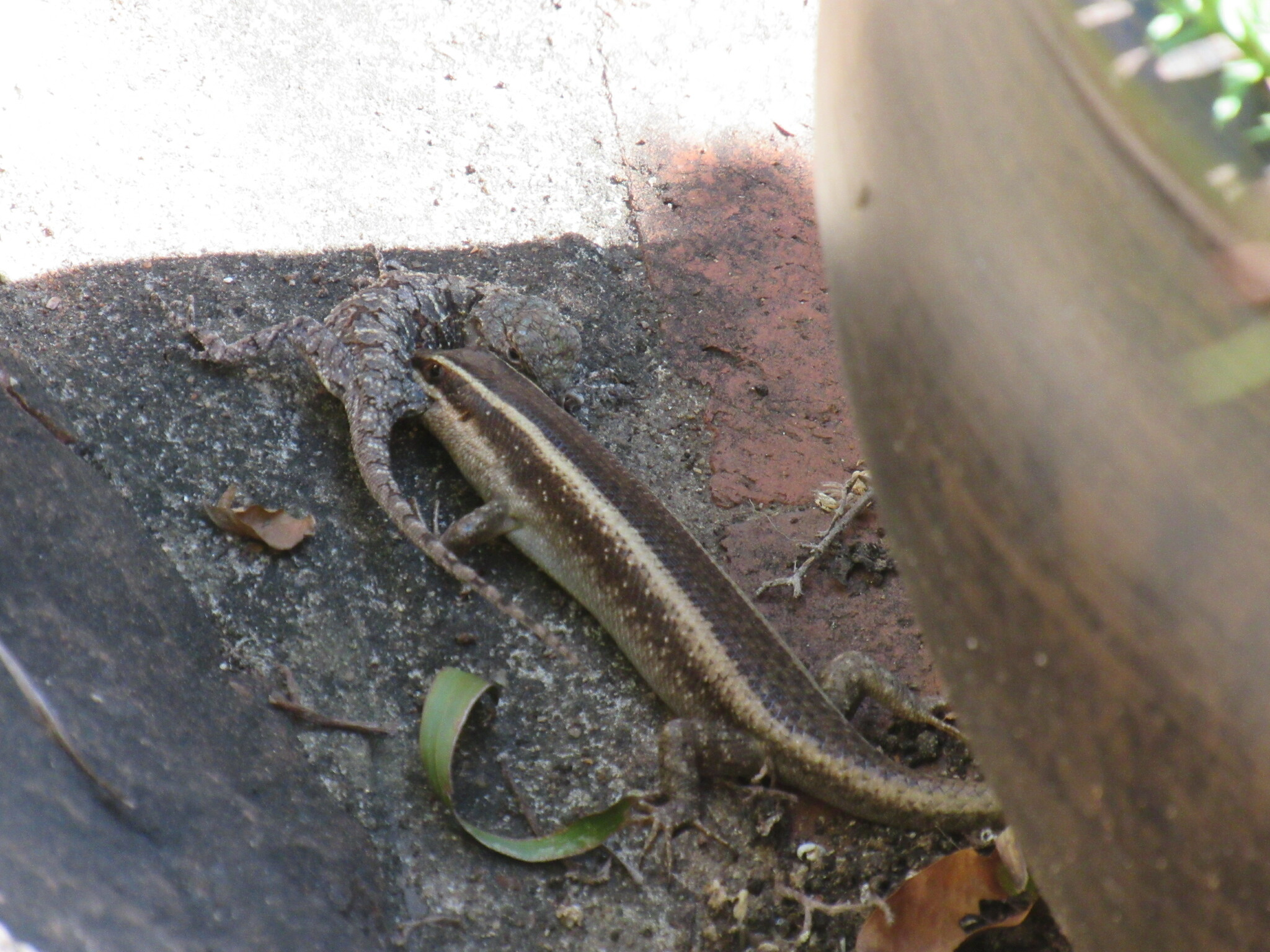
Hunting a juvenile southern tree agama. The attempt was unsuccessful.

T. striata is brown or bronze-coloured with two yellowish stripes that run lengthwise on either side of the spine. Both sexes grow to a total length (including tail) of 25 cm (9.8 in). Their tails are often missing due to predators.
