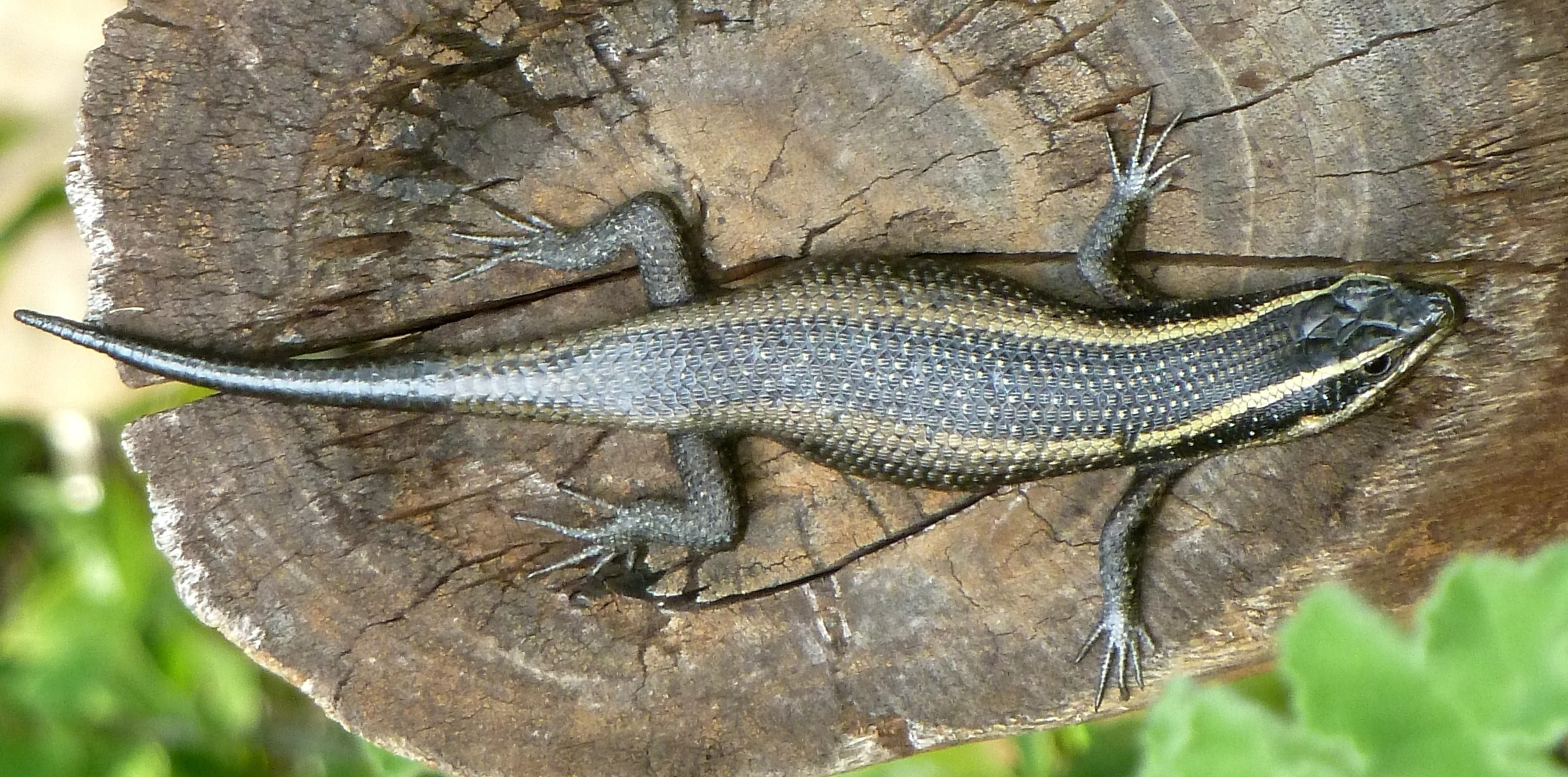
- T. punctatissima sunning in a garden

Conservation status
- Least Concern (IUCN 3.1)

Scientific classification
- Kingdom: Animalia
- Phylum: Chordata
- Class: Reptilia
- Order: Squamata
- Family: Scincidae
- Genus: Trachylepis
- Species: T. punctatissima

Binomial name
- Trachylepis punctatissima (Smith, 1849)
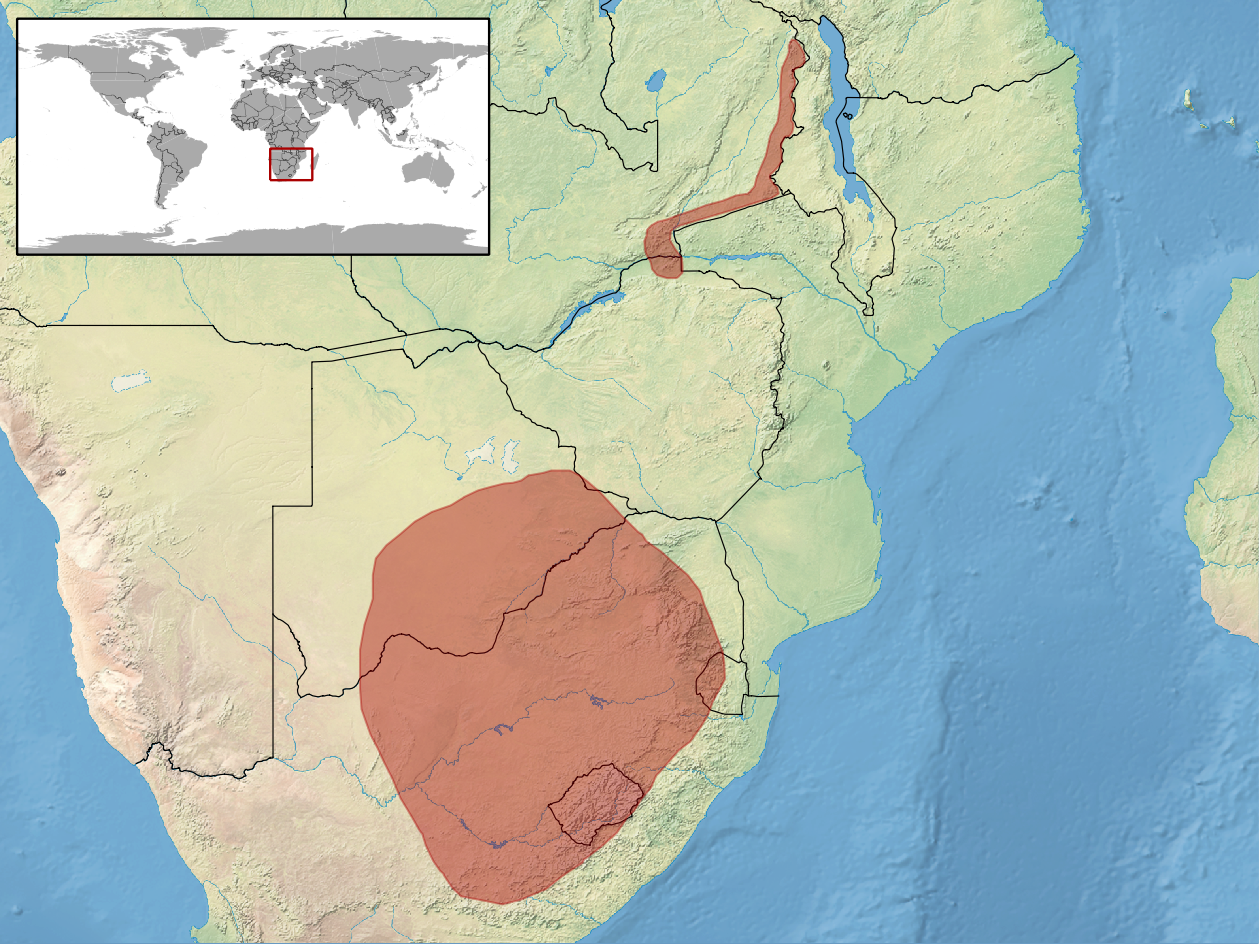

Synonyms
- Euprepes punctatissimus Smith, 1849; Mabouia gruetzneri Boulenger, 1887; Mabuia striata subsp. gruetzneri Sternfeld, 1911; Mabuya punctatissima (Smith, 1849); Mabuya striata subsp. punctatissima (Smith, 1849)

= Trachylepis punctatissima =

Species of lizard

Trachylepis punctatissima, commonly called the montane speckled skink or speckled rock skink, is a lizard in the skink family (Scincidae) which is widespread in southern Africa. The common and adaptable species occurs in a variety of habitat types at middle to high altitudes. It was for a time treated as a southern race of the African striped skink, T. striata.

== Description ==
This skink is dark grey brown in colour with two golden brown stripes that run lengthwise on either side of the spine. The underside is dirty white or pale grey. Both sexes grow to a length of about 19 cm (7.5 in).

== Habits and biology ==
They are diurnal and like to bask in the sun. Those in colder regions will spend a period in hibernation. They are ovoviviparous.

== Range and races ==
It is native to eastern Zambia, southern Malawi and Botswana, eastern Zimbabwe, central and northern South Africa, Lesotho and western Eswatini. The population on Mount Mulanje in southern Malawi was formerly included with Mabuya striata subsp. punctatissima, but is now treated as a full species, Trachylepis mlanjensis, while the Eastern Highlands population in Zimbabwe may similarly prove to be distinct.

== External references ==
- Media related to Trachylepis punctatissima at Wikimedia Commons
