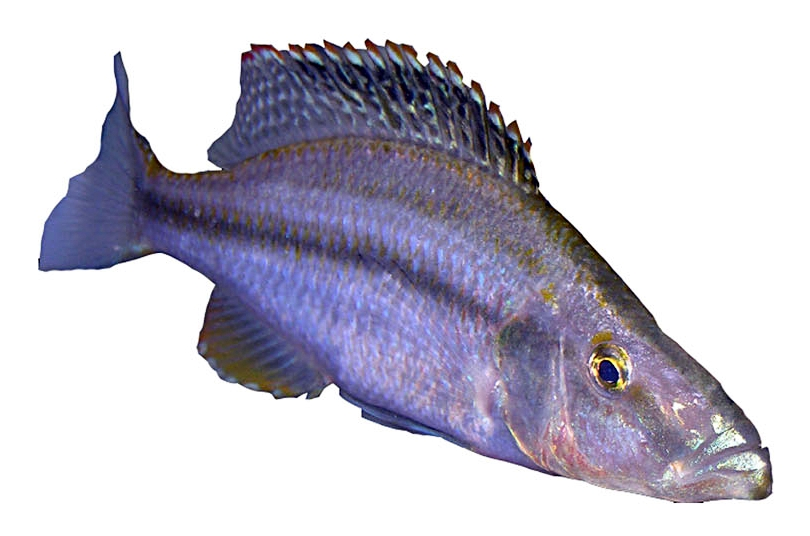
- Malawi eyebiter (D. compressiceps)

Scientific classification
- Kingdom: Animalia
- Phylum: Chordata
- Class: Actinopterygii
- Order: Cichliformes
- Family: Cichlidae
- Tribe: Haplochromini
- Genus: Dimidiochromis; Eccles & Trewavas, 1989

Type species
- Haplochromis strigatus Regan, 1922

= Dimidiochromis =

Genus of fishes

Dimidiochromis is a genus of haplochromine cichlids endemic to Lake Malawi in East Africa. All of its species are elongated in shape and predatory on smaller fishes.

== Species ==
There are currently four recognized species in this genus:

- Dimidiochromis compressiceps (Boulenger, 1908) (Malawi eyebiter)
- Dimidiochromis dimidiatus (Günther, 1864) (Ncheni haplo)
- Dimidiochromis kiwinge (C. G. E. Ahl, 1926)
- Dimidiochromis strigatus (Regan, 1922) (Sunset haplo)
