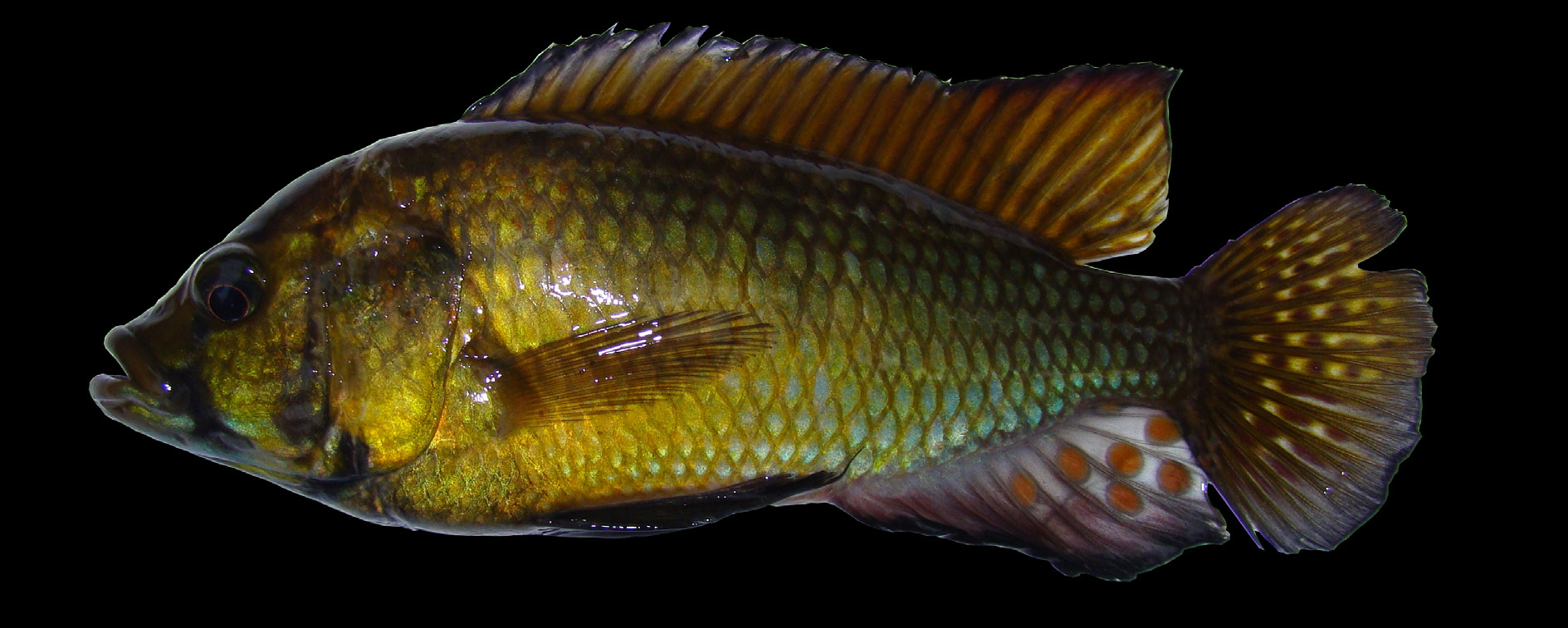

Conservation status
- Least Concern (IUCN 3.1)

Scientific classification
- Kingdom: Animalia
- Phylum: Chordata
- Class: Actinopterygii
- Order: Cichliformes
- Family: Cichlidae
- Genus: Astatoreochromis
- Species: A. alluaudi

Binomial name
- Astatoreochromis alluaudi Pellegrin, 1904

= Alluaud's haplo =

Species of fish

Alluaud's haplo (Astatoreochromis alluaudi) is a species of freshwater fish in the cichlid family, Cichlidae. It is native to East Africa, where it occurs in many lakes, including Lake Victoria.

This fish reaches about 19 centimeters in maximum length. It lives in swampy waters. It is omnivorous and is utilized to control snails. In the wild, snails make up a significant part its diet. This is reflected in its thick jaw, adapted to crush shells. It is not considered to be a threatened species by the International Union for Conservation of Nature (IUCN). The specific name honours Charles A. Alluaud (1861–1949) the French explorer and entomologist who was the collector of the type specimen of this species.
