= Dimidiochromis kiwinge =

Conservation status
- Least Concern (IUCN 3.1)

Scientific classification
- Kingdom: Animalia
- Phylum: Chordata
- Class: Actinopterygii
- Order: Cichliformes
- Family: Cichlidae
- Genus: Dimidiochromis
- Species: D. kiwinge

Binomial name
- Dimidiochromis kiwinge (Ahl, 1926)

Synonyms
- Haplochromis kiwinge Ahl, 1926; Cyrtocara kiwinge (Ahl, 1926); Haplochromis fuelleborni Ahl, 1926

Species of fish

Dimidiochromis kiwinge is a species of haplochromine cichlid which is found in Lake Malawi and Lake Malombe in Malawi, Mozambique, and Tanzania. Its natural habitat is freshwater lakes.

This species is normally found in the vicinity of rocks, although it frequently forms offshore shoals and is a common predator on the surface near the shore where it feeds on small fishes, especially utaka and Lake Malawi sardines. It either hunts in pairs or in large groups. The females are mouthbrooders and while they are brooding young they remain in midwater until the fry are released. This species is a lek breeder in which the males create raised bowls in the substrate near to each other and compete for the attention of the females which are ready to spawn.
