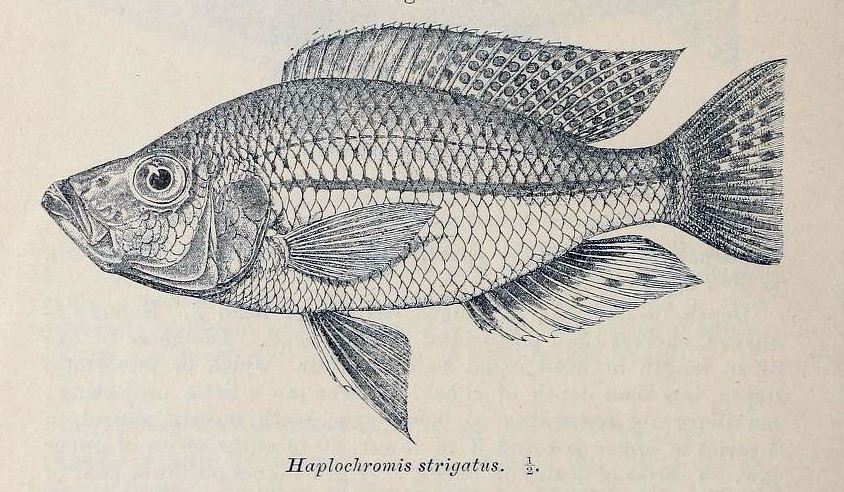

Conservation status
- Least Concern (IUCN 3.1)

Scientific classification
- Kingdom: Animalia
- Phylum: Chordata
- Class: Actinopterygii
- Order: Cichliformes
- Family: Cichlidae
- Genus: Dimidiochromis
- Species: D. strigatus

Binomial name
- Dimidiochromis strigatus (Regan, 1922)

Synonyms
- Haplochromis strigatus Regan, 1922; Cyrtocara strigata (Regan, 1922)

= Dimidiochromis strigatus =

Species of fish

Dimidiochromis strigatus is a species of haplochromine cichlid endemic to Malawi. It was formerly placed in the genus Haplochromis and known as Haplochromis 'sunset' in the aquarium fish trade.

It is endemic to Malawi where it is found in Lake Malawi, Lake Malombe and the upper and mid Shire River. It is normally found in shallower areas with a mixture of weedy and sandy habitats. It is a predator of small fishes such as utaka and larger invertebrates. The territorial males defend a small spawning site which they create either among the vegetation or on the open sand.
