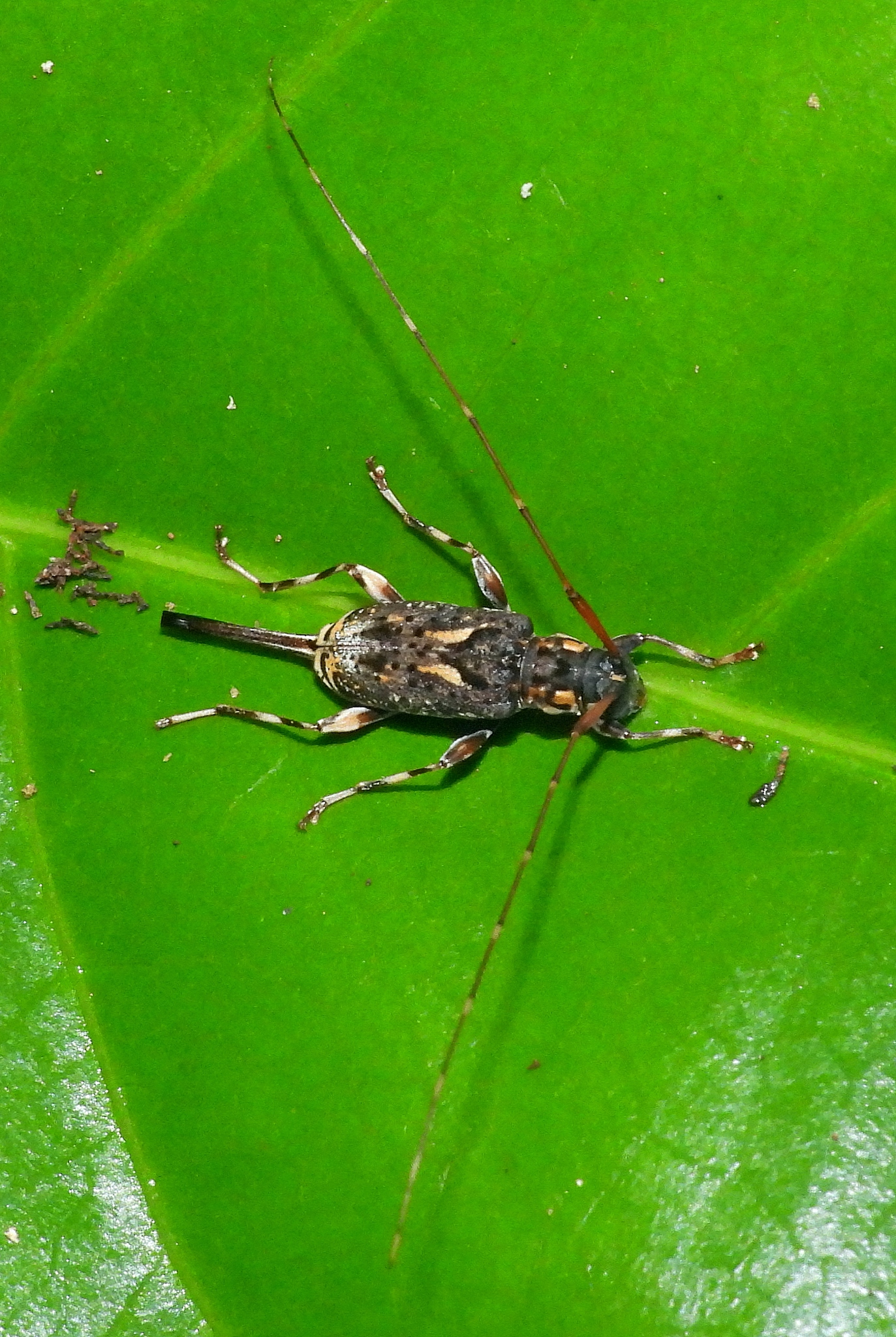

Scientific classification
- Kingdom: Animalia
- Phylum: Arthropoda
- Clade: Pancrustacea
- Class: Insecta
- Order: Coleoptera
- Suborder: Polyphaga
- Infraorder: Cucujiformia
- Family: Cerambycidae
- Genus: Toronaeus
- Species: T. perforator

Binomial name
- Toronaeus perforator Bates, 1864

= Toronaeus perforator =

Species of beetle

Toronaeus perforator is a species of beetle in the family Cerambycidae. It was first described in 1864 by the British entomologist Frederick Bates.
