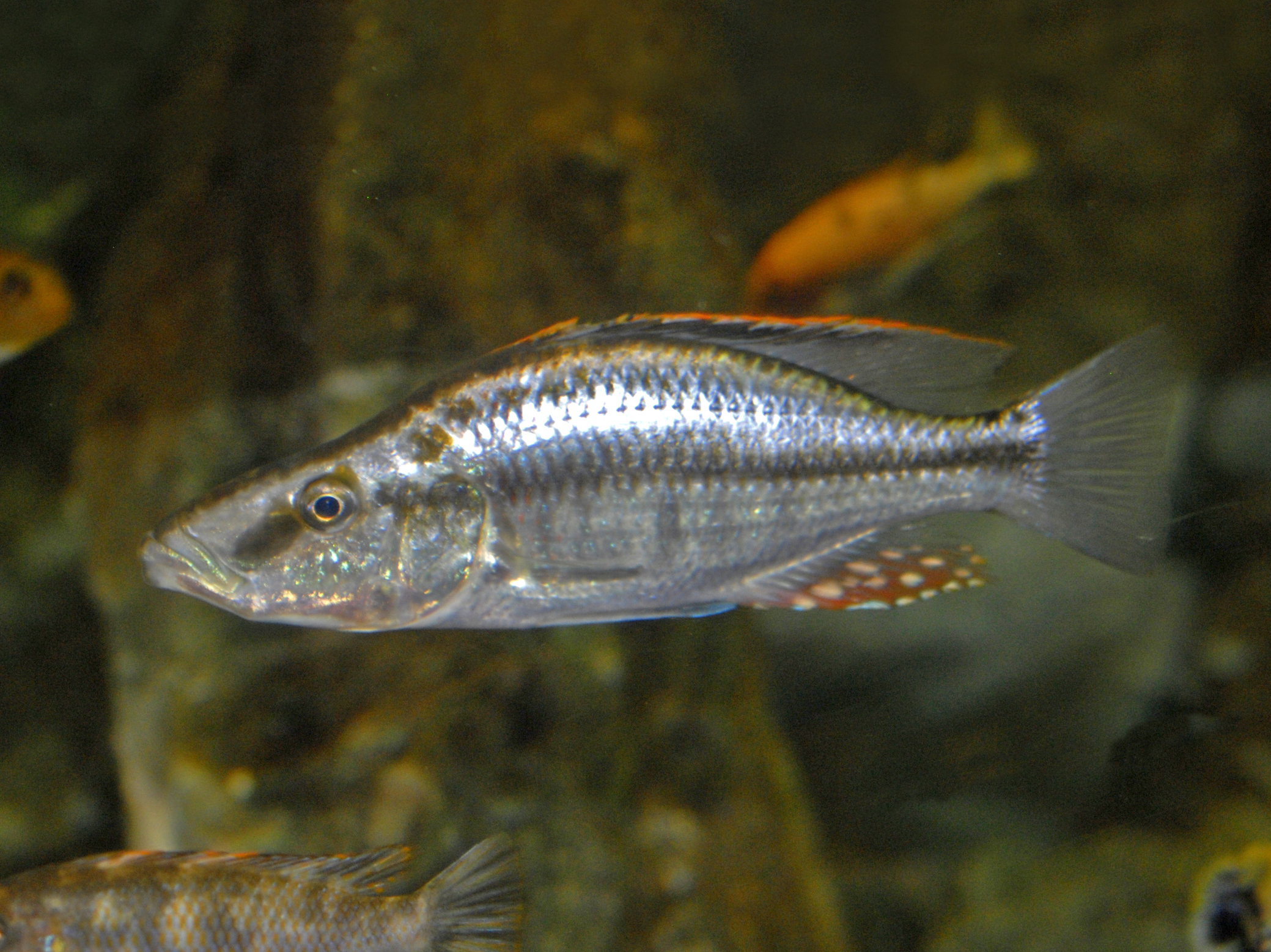
- Dimidiochromis compressiceps at the Aquarium of Genoa

Conservation status
- Least Concern (IUCN 3.1)

Scientific classification
- Kingdom: Animalia
- Phylum: Chordata
- Class: Actinopterygii
- Order: Cichliformes
- Family: Cichlidae
- Genus: Dimidiochromis
- Species: D. compressiceps

Binomial name
- Dimidiochromis compressiceps (Boulenger, 1908)

Synonyms
- Paratilapia compressiceps Boulenger, 1908; Cyrtocara compressiceps (Boulenger, 1908); Haplochromis compressiceps (Boulenger, 1908)

= Malawi eyebiter =

Species of fish

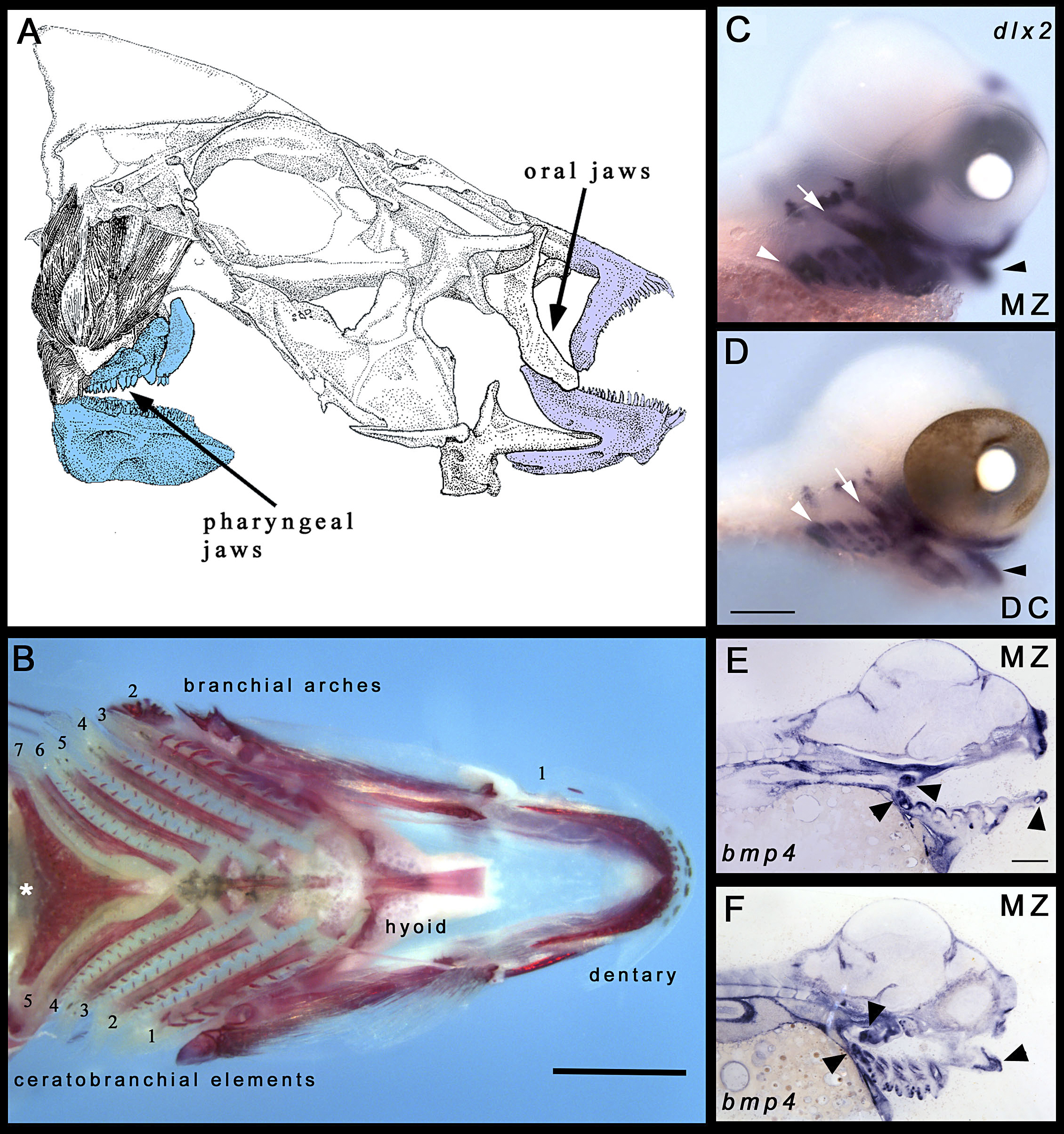
Toothed oral and pharyngeal jaws of the Malawi eyebiter.

The Malawi eyebiter (Dimidiochromis compressiceps) is a species of fish in the family Cichlidae. This predatory cichlid is found in Lake Malawi, Lake Malombe, and the upper Shire River within East Africa.

== Description ==
Dimidiochromis compressiceps can reach a length of about 23 centimetres (9.1 in). The females are considerably smaller than males. The body is narrow and laterally compressed (hence the Latin name compressiceps) minimizing its visibility. The mouth is quite large and jaws are relatively long, reaching about one-third of the body length. This large and impressive cichlid normally shows a whitish-silver body with a brown horizontal stripe along the sides, from the snout to the tail. Sexually mature males put on a dazzling metallic blue with reds and oranges on their fins.

== Behavior ==
This species once was regarded as a specialist, feeding on eyes of other fishes (hence the common name eyebiter), (Winkler, 1966) but such behavior has never been observed in the wild.

Though the eyeballs of cyprinids have been found in gut samples taken from this species, it is not clear whether this is normal feeding behaviour or occurs only when food is scarce, as with the North American cutlips minnow, which also displays this feeding habit. Another suggestion is that the Malawi eyebiter might rip out the eyes of other fishes so that it is easier to overcome the incapacitated prey.

Dimidiochromis compressiceps may be a non-territorial open-water predator, but also an ambush predator. Their laterally-compressed bodies are an adaptation that permits them to hide amongst aquatic plants and dart out to grasp prey as it passes. These cichlids are mainly piscivorous, especially on small fish and are nearly unique among fish species in that they that swallow their prey tail-first instead of flipping it around head-first.

The territorial males excavate a shallow depression in the sand as spawning site. Normally the spawning site sits between beds of aquatic plants but occasionally it is placed underneath or in the vicinity of a submerged tree trunk, or beneath an overhanging rock. The courting males display their more intense colours and vigorously lead the females to the spawning site. The female lays her eggs into the spawning site and then immediately takes them into her mouth. The males have markings on their anal fins which resemble the eggs and which attract the female. When the female opens her mouth to add these "eggs" to the brood in her mouth the male releases his milt into her mouth to inseminate the eggs. While they are mouthbrooding the females are solitary, holding the young in their mouths for around 3 weeks and eventually release their brood among the schools of juvenile utaka which hide among the vegetation.

== Distribution ==
This species can be found in Malawi, Mozambique, and Tanzania. It is endemic to Lake Malawi, Lake Malombe and the upper Shire River in East Africa.

== Aquarium requirements ==
In the aquarium Dimidiochromis compressiceps usually prefer to swim out in the open unlike the more common "Mbuna" (rock dwellers). They can become quite aggressive during spawning, vigorously defending their territory from all intruders. A single male should be kept in a harem-style environment with multiple females, as this diverts his aggression from any particular female.

In aquarium they should be housed in at least a 100-gallon tank to accommodate their large size and aggressive behaviour. Also, any other fishes that are smaller in size and less assertive should be avoided as they are likely to be eaten. This species also is likely to behave aggressively towards other similarly colored species. As with all cichlids of Lake Malawi, they prefer hard, alkaline water.
