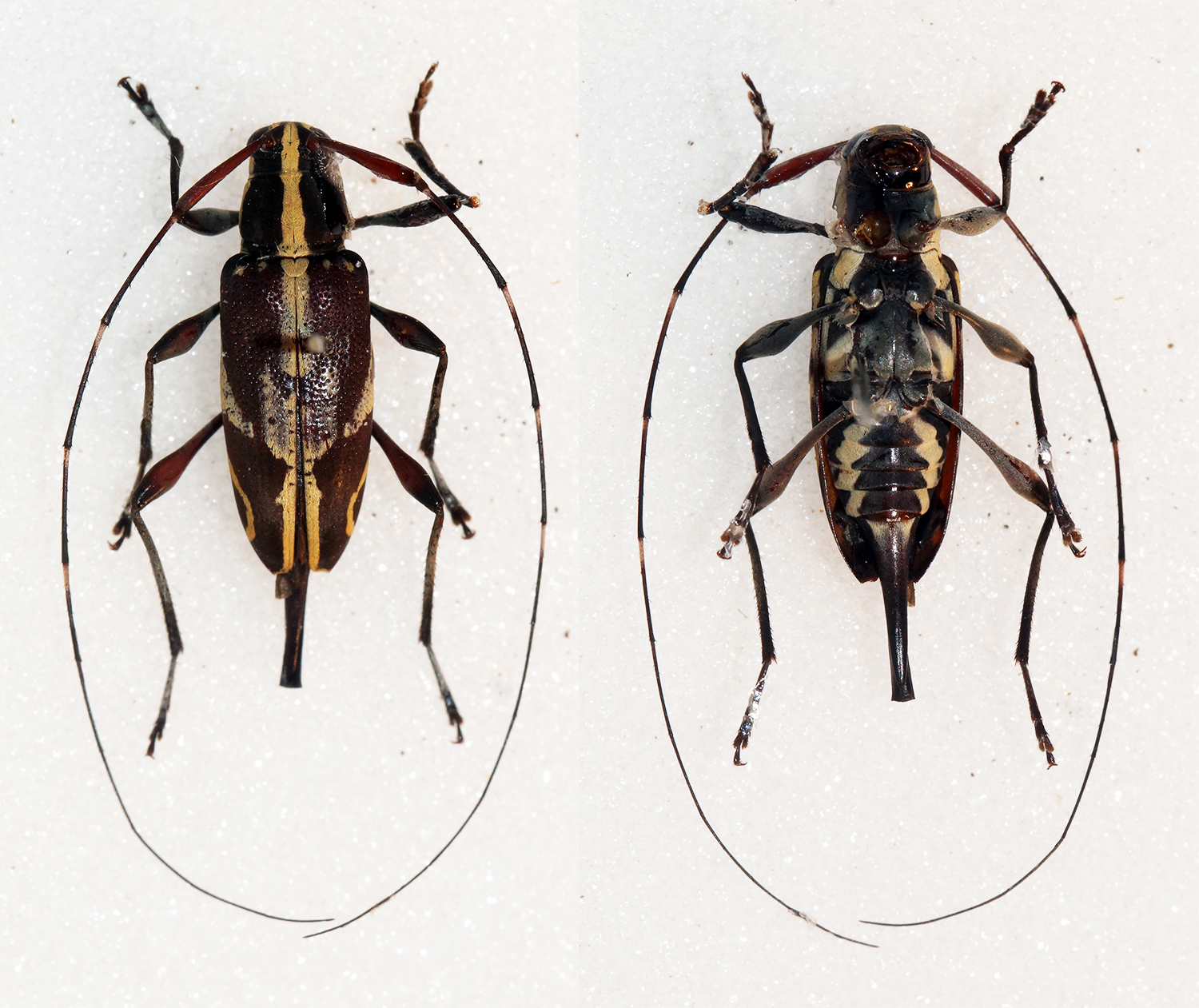
- Toronaeus suavis

Scientific classification
- Kingdom: Animalia
- Phylum: Arthropoda
- Class: Insecta
- Order: Coleoptera
- Suborder: Polyphaga
- Infraorder: Cucujiformia
- Family: Cerambycidae
- Tribe: Acanthocinini
- Genus: Toronaeus

= Toronaeus =

Genus of beetles

Toronaeus is a genus of beetles in the family Cerambycidae, containing the following species:

- Toronaeus figuratus Bates, 1864
- Toronaeus incisus (Bates, 1864)
- Toronaeus lautus Monné, 1990
- Toronaeus magnificus (Tippmann, 1953)
- Toronaeus perforator Bates, 1864
- Toronaeus simillimus Monné, 1974
- Toronaeus suavis Bates, 1864
- Toronaeus sumptuosus Lane, 1973
- Toronaeus terebrans Bates, 1864
- Toronaeus virens Bates, 1864
