= Toronaeus magnificus =

Scientific classification
- Kingdom: Animalia
- Phylum: Arthropoda
- Class: Insecta
- Order: Coleoptera
- Suborder: Polyphaga
- Infraorder: Cucujiformia
- Family: Cerambycidae
- Genus: Toronaeus
- Species: T. magnificus

Binomial name
- Toronaeus magnificus (Tippmann, 1953)

Species of beetle

Toronaeus magnificus is a species of beetle in the family Cerambycidae. It was first described by Tippmann in 1953.
