= Toronaeus simillimus =

Scientific classification
- Kingdom: Animalia
- Phylum: Arthropoda
- Class: Insecta
- Order: Coleoptera
- Suborder: Polyphaga
- Infraorder: Cucujiformia
- Family: Cerambycidae
- Genus: Toronaeus
- Species: T. simillimus

Binomial name
- Toronaeus simillimus Monné, 1974

Species of beetle

Toronaeus simillimus is a species of beetle in the family Cerambycidae. It was described by Monné in 1974.
