= Pharyngeal jaw =

Mophological feature in some fish

The pharyngeal jaws of the moray eel.

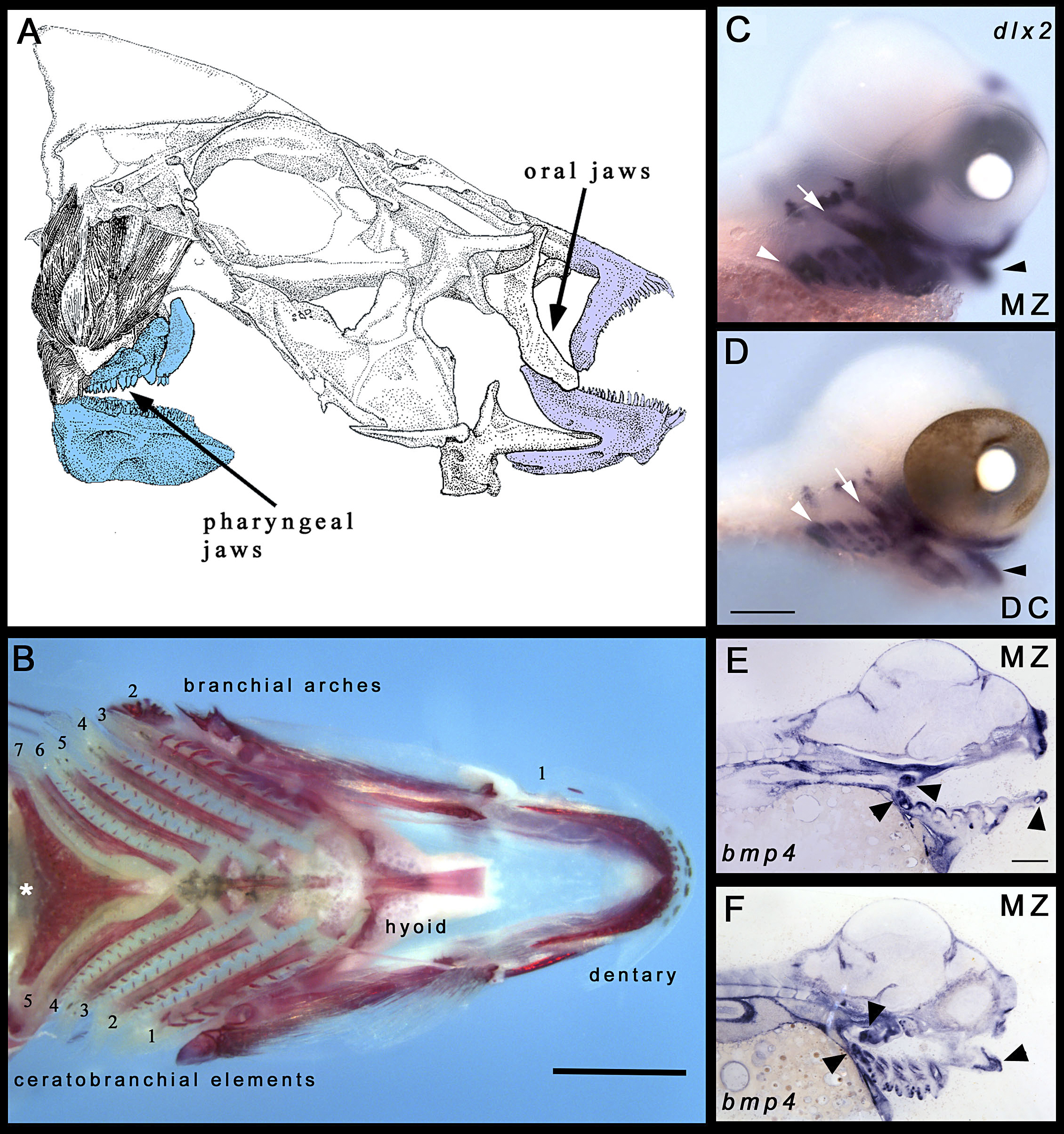
Oral and pharyngeal jaws of a cichlid. The photographs show a Malawi eyebiter (Dimidiochromis compressiceps).

Pharyngeal jaws are a "second set" of jaws contained within an animal's throat, or pharynx, distinct from the primary or oral jaws. They are believed to have originated as modified gill arches, in much the same way as oral jaws. Originally hypothesized to have evolved only once, current morphological and genetic analyses suggest at least two separate points of origin. Based on connections between musculoskeletal morphology and dentition, diet has been proposed as a main driver of the evolution of the pharyngeal jaw. A study conducted on cichlids showed that the pharyngeal jaws can undergo morphological changes in less than two years in response to their diet. Fish that ate hard-shelled prey had a robust jaw with molar-like teeth fit for crushing their durable prey. Fish that ate softer prey, on the other hand, exhibited a more slender jaw with thin, curved teeth used for tearing apart fleshy prey. These rapid changes are an example of phenotypic plasticity, wherein environmental factors affect genetic expression responsible for pharyngeal jaw development. Studies of the genetic pathways suggest that receptors in the jaw bone respond to the mechanical strain of biting hard-shelled prey, which prompts the formation of a more robust set of pharyngeal jaws.

== Cichlids ==
A notable example are fish from the family Cichlidae. Cichlid pharyngeal jaws have become very specialized in prey processing and may have helped cichlid fishes become one of the most diverse families of vertebrates. However, later studies based on Lake Victoria cichlids suggest that this trait may also become a handicap when competing with other predator species.

== Moray eels ==
Most fish species with pharyngeal teeth do not have extendable pharyngeal jaws. A particularly notable exception is the highly mobile pharyngeal jaw of the moray eels. These are possibly a response to their inability to swallow as other fishes do by creating a negative pressure in the mouth, perhaps induced by their restricted environmental niche (burrows) or in the air in the intertidal zone. Instead, when the moray bites prey, it first bites normally with its oral jaws, capturing the prey. Immediately thereafter, the pharyngeal jaws are brought forward and bite down on the prey to grip it; they then retract, pulling the prey down the moray eel's gullet, allowing it to be swallowed.

== Popular culture ==
The fictional Xenomorph from the Alien film series has a mobile inner jaw, but that art predates the discovery of the exceptional mobility of the moray's pharyngeal jaw and its unique role in feeding. While pharyngeal jaws in other fish were already known, artist H. R. Giger claimed he "hadn't studied any animal" when designing the double jaw of the xenomorph.

In the game Hungry Shark Evolution, the character "Big Daddy (Dunkleosteus)" is depicted with a pharyngeal jaw.

The final boss of Monster Hunter Rise Thunder Serpent Narwa, as well as her male counterpart Wind Serpent Ibushi and variant form Narwa the Allmother, all possess pharyngeal jaws within their throats.
