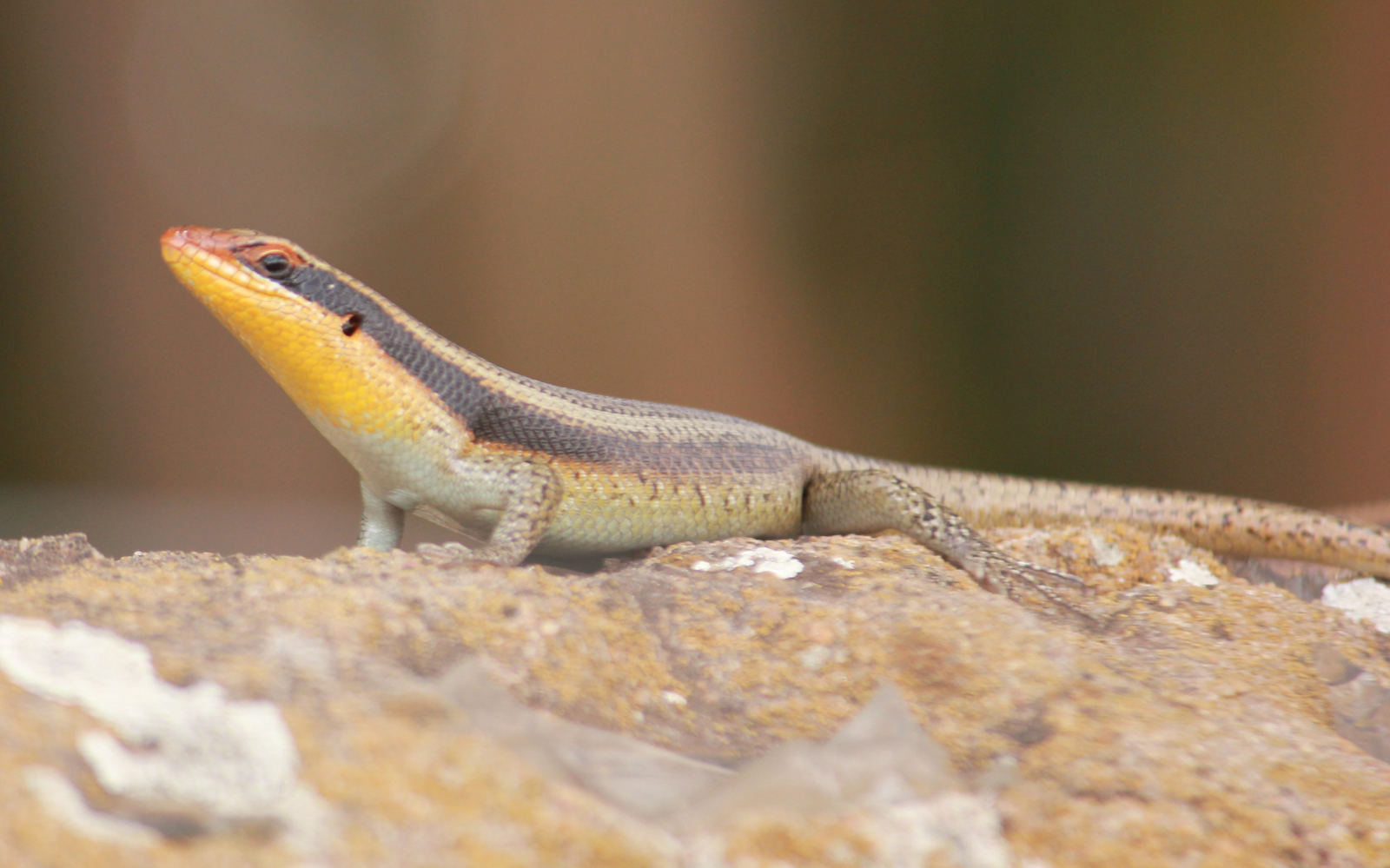

Scientific classification
- Kingdom: Animalia
- Phylum: Chordata
- Class: Reptilia
- Order: Squamata
- Family: Scincidae
- Genus: Trachylepis
- Species: T. wahlbergii

Binomial name
- Trachylepis wahlbergii (W. Peters, 1870)

Synonyms
- Euprepes Wahlbergii W. Peters, 1870; Mabuya ellenbergeri Chabanaud, 1917; Mabuya striata FitzSimons, 1943 (part); Mabuya striata wahlbergi — Broadley, 1971; Mabuya wahlbergi — Branch, 1993; Trachylepis striata wahlbergii — Klitscher, 2014; Trachylepis wahlbergii — Marques et al., 2018

= Trachylepis wahlbergii =

Species of lizard

Trachylepis wahlbergii, also known commonly as Wahlberg's striped skink, is a species of lizard in the family Scincidae. The species is native to Southern Africa.

== Taxonomy ==
Trachylepis wahlbergii has been considered a subspecies of Trachylepis striata. Whether T. wahlbergii is truly distinct from T. striata is not fully settled.

== Geographic range ==
T. wahlbergii occurs in southern Angola, northern Botswana, northern Namibia, western Mozambique, Zambia, and northern, western and southern Zimbabwe.

== Etymology ==
The specific name, wahlbergi, is in honour of Swedish Naturalist Johan August Wahlberg.

== Reproduction ==
T. wahlbergii is viviparous.
