= Lake Nakivali =

Freshwater lake in Uganda

Coordinates: 0°46′48″S 30°53′17″E

Lake Nakivale
- Lake Nakivali
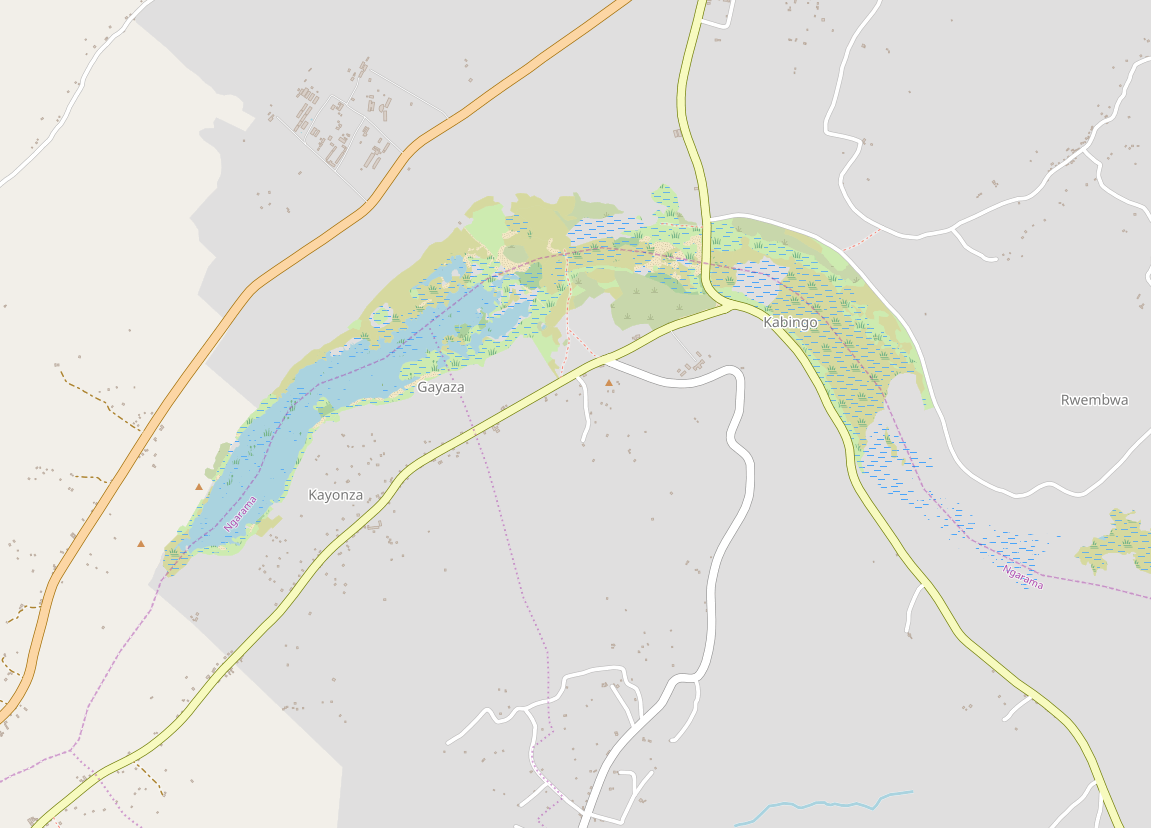
- Lake Nakivale
- Interactive map of Lake Nakivale
- Location: Isingiro district
- Basin countries: Uganda

Lake Nakivali, also known as Lake Nakivale, is a freshwater lake located in western Uganda's Isingiro District; it is part of the Lake Mburo-Nakivale wetland system. It is located about 40 kilometers south-east of Mbarara town.

== Biodiversity ==
Lake Nakivale have 9 fish species (4 haplochromines and 5 non-haplochromines) were discovered. Catches were dominated by cichlids (tilapiines and Nkejje haplochromines). By numbers, the haplochromines dominated by Astatotilapia aeneocolor,(89%) was the most numerous species while the tilapias Oreochromis esculentus, Oreochromis niloticus and Oreochromis leucostictus followed (8%). Mamba Protopterus aethiopicus (2%) was third. The other fish species of commercial importance, Male Clarias gariepinus contributed 0.25%.

== Settlements ==
Location of Isingiro District in Uganda.

The lake serves both the refugees in the Nakivale Refugee Settlement and Ugandan nations in the areas next to the Lake. It has been under threat due to the massive pollution from silting following the massive deforestation due to the setting up the refugee camps although the refugees have taken the lead role in the conservation and protection of the lake. On a rocky escarpment on a hill at Nakivale refugee settlement, a group of workers use hand-held tools to dig a series of holes, lowers in pine-tree seedlings and then covers them up in order to restore back the forest. A view from Nakivale Refugee Settlement indicates green valley leading to Lake Nakivale. Some people were evicted from Lake Nakivale protection zones.

== Activities ==
- Crop cultivation on the shores of lake Nakivale is causing silting and shrinking of the water levels
- Deforestation
- Illegal and excessive fishing, over 70% of the inhabitants around the lake live on fishing
- Agricultural activities like farming, livestock rearing, causes pollution of the water
- Other human activities like brick making around the shores of the lake lead to pollution of the water
- Children swim in the section of lake while others draw water for home use

== Ecosystem collapse ==
Gauges within Lake Nakivale indicate that the lake basin has been covered by silt reducing the depth of the lake by 4m and besides that the surface area(width) has been reduced by 10m from the shores. The continuous inflow of silt into 25 square kilometre lake Nakivale has turned the water brownish due to mud pollution. Siltation is caused by poor vegetation management for example tree cutting on Ngarama and Kabingo hills as well as over grazing, bushfires, charcoal burning and lack of terraces.

== See also ==
- Lake Albert
- Lake Bunyonyi
