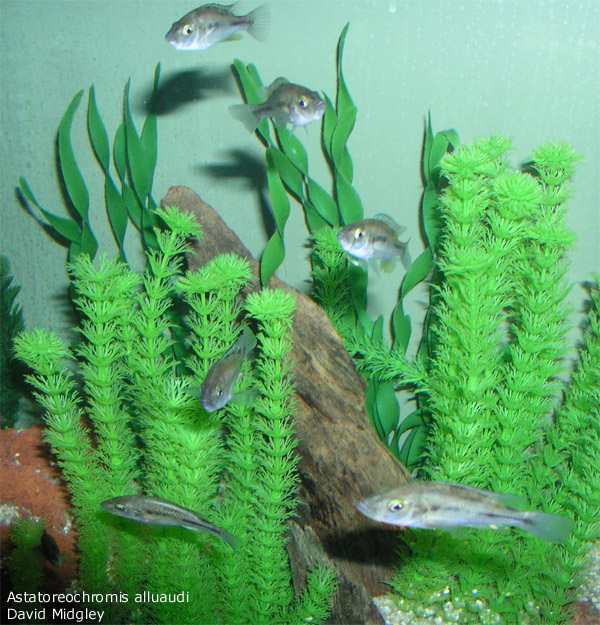
- Alluaud's Haplo, (A. alluaudi)

Scientific classification
- Kingdom: Animalia
- Phylum: Chordata
- Class: Actinopterygii
- Order: Cichliformes
- Family: Cichlidae
- Subfamily: Pseudocrenilabrinae
- Tribe: Haplochromini
- Genus: Astatoreochromis; Pellegrin, 1904

Type species
- Astatoreochromis alluaudi Pellegrin, 1904

= Astatoreochromis =

Genus of fishes

Astatoreochromis is a small genus of haplochromine cichlids endemic to riverine habitats in East Africa. Tilapia bemini, usually placed in the tilapiines, may be rather close to this genus. However, extensive hybridization capabilities of African cichlids seriously confound analyses of phylogeny based on mtDNA, while morphological analyses tend to yield little information due to widespread parallel evolution.

== Species ==
There are currently three recognized species in this genus:

- Astatoreochromis alluaudi Pellegrin, 1904 (Alluaud's Haplo)
- Astatoreochromis straeleni (Poll, 1944) (Bluelip Haplo)
- Astatoreochromis vanderhorsti (Greenwood, 1954) — validity questionable, likely a synonym of A. straeleni.
