= Toronaeus incisus =

Scientific classification
- Kingdom: Animalia
- Phylum: Arthropoda
- Class: Insecta
- Order: Coleoptera
- Suborder: Polyphaga
- Infraorder: Cucujiformia
- Family: Cerambycidae
- Genus: Toronaeus
- Species: T. incisus

Binomial name
- Toronaeus incisus (Bates, 1864)

Species of beetle

Toronaeus incisus is a species of beetle in the family Cerambycidae. It was described by Henry Walter Bates in 1864.
