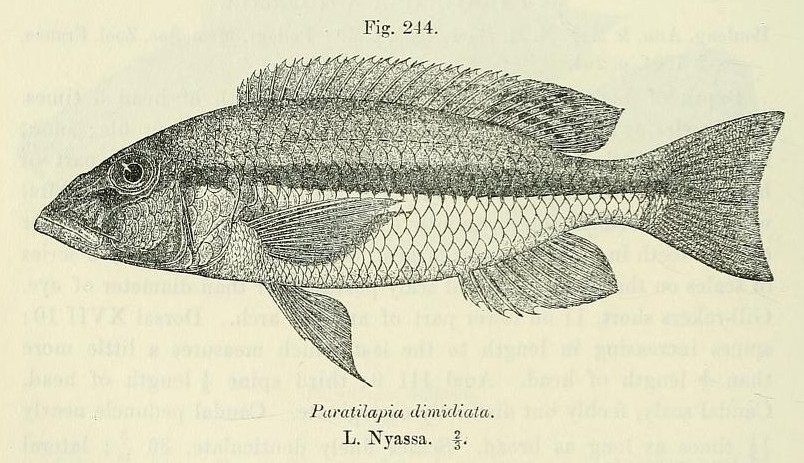

Conservation status
- Least Concern (IUCN 3.1)

Scientific classification
- Kingdom: Animalia
- Phylum: Chordata
- Class: Actinopterygii
- Order: Cichliformes
- Family: Cichlidae
- Genus: Dimidiochromis
- Species: D. dimidiatus

Binomial name
- Dimidiochromis dimidiatus (Günther, 1864)

Synonyms
- Hemichromis dimidiatus Günther, 1864; Cyrtocara dimidiata (Günther, 1864); Haplochromis dimidiatus (Günther, 1864); Paratilapia dimidiata (Günther, 1864)

= Ncheni type haplochromis =

Species of fish

the Ncheni type haplochromis (Dimidiochromis dimidiatus) is a species of freshwater fish in the family Cichlidae. It was formerly placed in the genus Haplochromis and is known in the aquarium fish trade.

It is endemic to Lake Malawi being found in Malawi, Mozambique, and Tanzania.
