= Lake Mburo–Nakivali Wetland System =

Wetland in Uganda

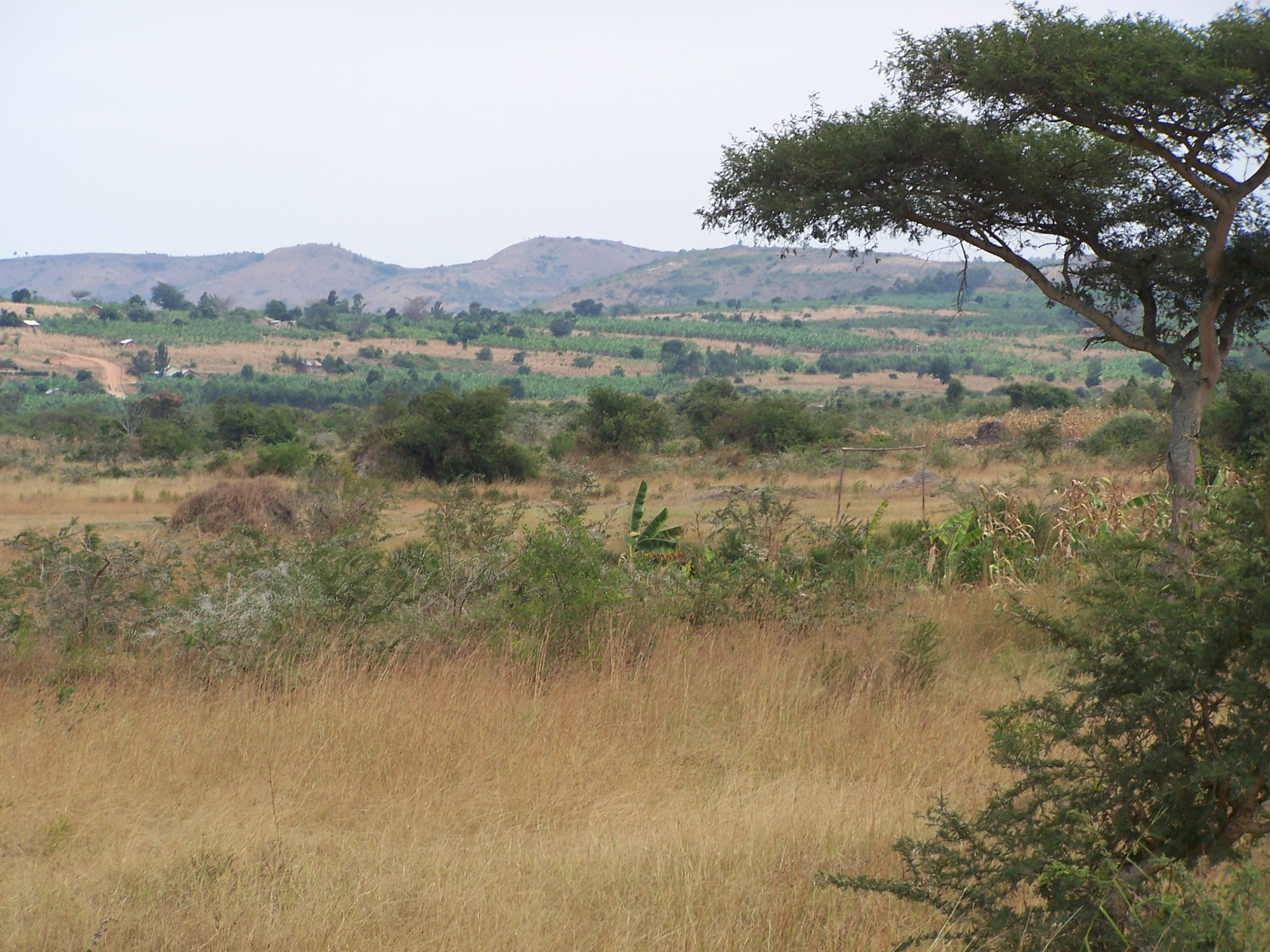
- Lake Mburo National Park
- Location: Mbarara district, Uganda
- Coordinates: 0°42′S 31°00′E
- Surface area: 26,834 hectares (66,310 acres)

Lake Mburo–Nakivali Wetland System is a wetland located in Mbarara district 60 km from Mbarara town in western Uganda, and East Africa, bordering Tanzania and Rwanda. The system encompasses five lakes lying in Lake Mburo National Park, including Mburo being the largest, Kigambira, Mutukula, Kazuma, and Bwara in the west-east location.

It is a source of water for domestic use, wildlife, and livestock. It is also a source of food including fish, provides pastures for herds, as well as materials for making crafts, baskets, and thatching.

== Location ==
Lake Mburo–Nakivali Wetland System covers an area of 26,834 hectares (66,310 acres) and lies on these coordinates 00°40'S 30°57'E. The system also lies at the convergence of two biological zones: the Lake Victoria regional mosaic and the Guinea-Congolian biogeographic region. Both permanent and seasonal wetlands surround this system.

Lake Mburo–Nakivali Wetland System can be accessed by road from Kampala. And also by air from Entebbe to Mbarara airstrip, followed by an hour's drive to the national park.

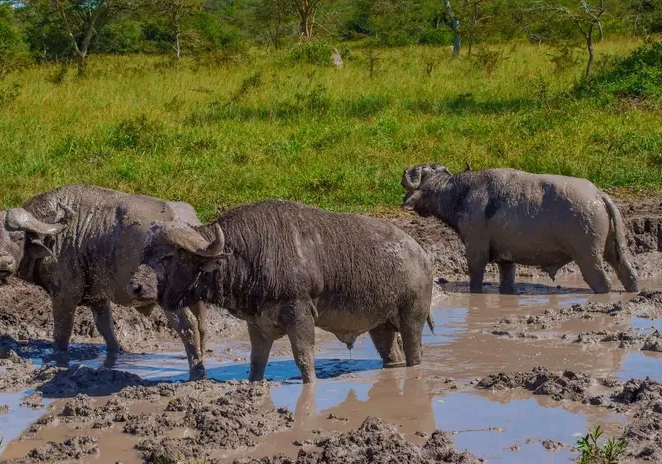
Buffaloes at the Lake Mburo -Nakivale National Park

== Description ==
Rocks of pre-cambrian geological time underlie the Lake Mburo wetland system. The rocks are wholly granitized and argillitic, they are regularly, distributed as thin bands throughout the system. Also, the system is predominated by ferrallitic soils.

Lake Mburo–Nakivali Wetland System is of great importance to the local community, Uganda at large, and the international community. This system provides refugia to 22 wetland bird specialists (13 species are Palaearctic and 9 species are Afro-tropical) during adverse conditions.

== Activities in the wetland ==
Lake Mburo–Nakivali Wetland System is used for socio-economic purposes, including water for domestic, wildlife, and livestock use; pastures for herds during drought season; and livestock and wildlife use. It also contains materials for crafting and thatching, and is used as a point for scientific research and tourism.

== Threats ==
The Lake Mburo–Nakivali Wetland System is threatened by overfishing, hunting, and habitat destruction.

== See also ==
- Lake Nabugabo wetland system
- Lake George (Uganda)
