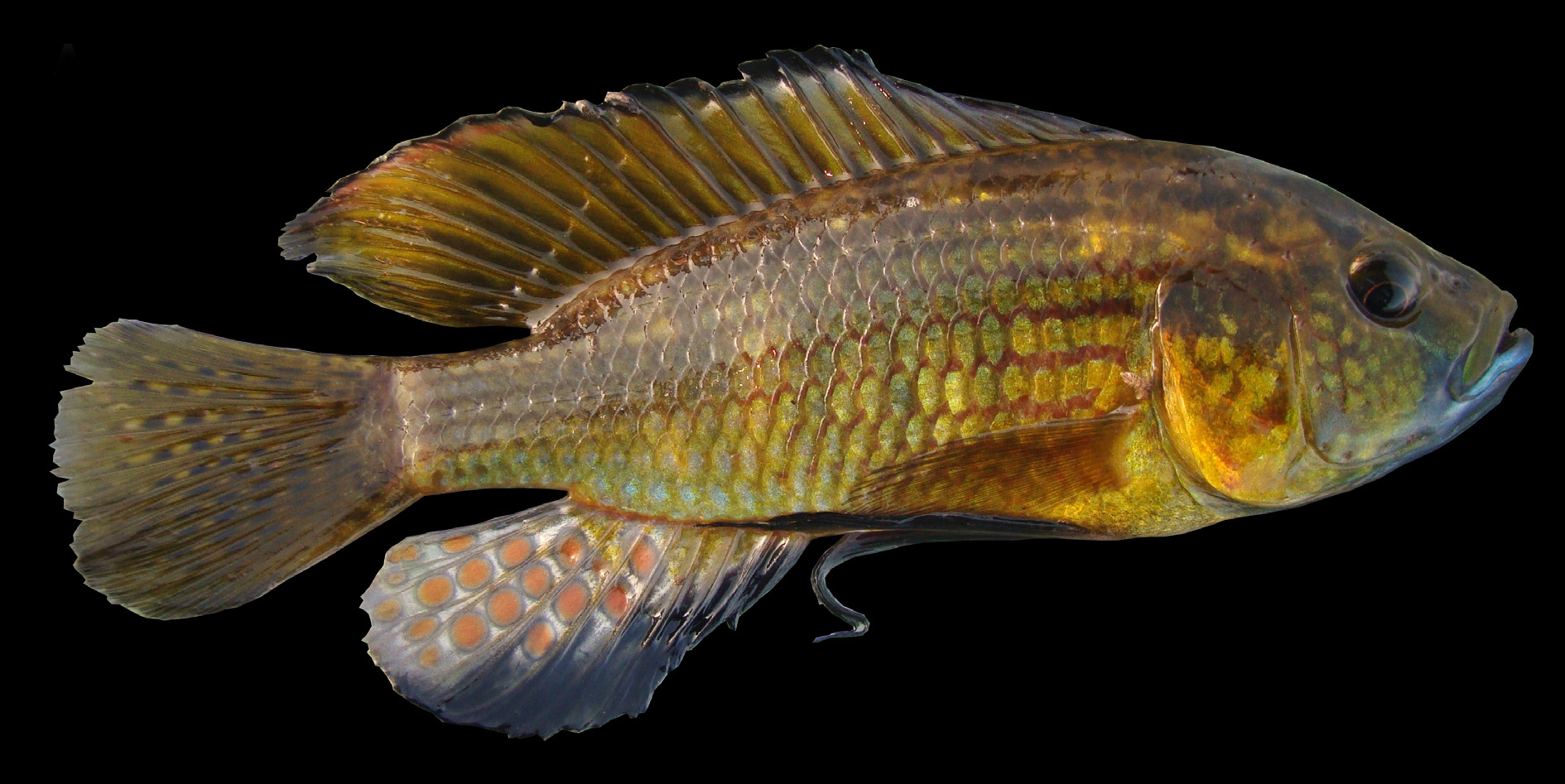

Conservation status
- Least Concern (IUCN 3.1)

Scientific classification
- Kingdom: Animalia
- Phylum: Chordata
- Class: Actinopterygii
- Order: Cichliformes
- Family: Cichlidae
- Genus: Astatoreochromis
- Species: A. straeleni

Binomial name
- Astatoreochromis straeleni (Poll, 1944)

= Bluelip haplo =

Species of fish

The bluelip haplo (Astatoreochromis straeleni) is a species of fish in the family Cichlidae. It is found in Burundi, the Democratic Republic of the Congo, Tanzania, and Zambia.

Its natural habitat is rivers. It is not considered a threatened species by the IUCN.

The specific name honours the director of the Royal Belgian Institute of Natural Sciences, Victor van Straelen (1889-1964).
