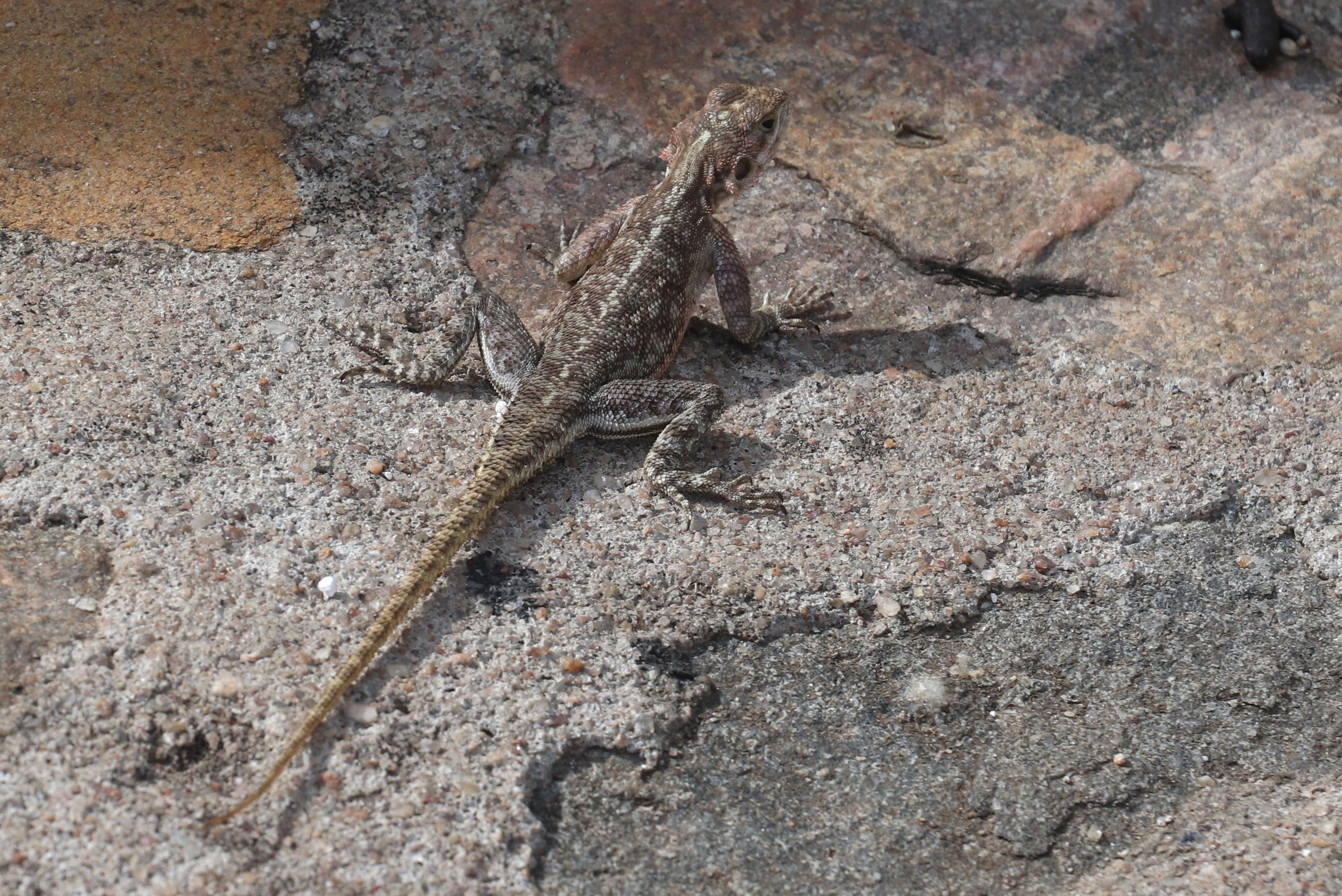

Conservation status
- Least Concern (IUCN 3.1)

Scientific classification
- Kingdom: Animalia
- Phylum: Chordata
- Class: Reptilia
- Order: Squamata
- Suborder: Iguania
- Family: Agamidae
- Genus: Acanthocercus
- Species: A. gregorii

Binomial name
- Acanthocercus gregorii (Günther, 1894)

= Acanthocercus gregorii =

Species of lizard

Acanthocercus gregorii, the blue-headed tree agama, black-necked agama, southern tree agama, or blue-throated agama, is a species of lizard in the family Agamidae. It is a small lizard found in Kenya.
