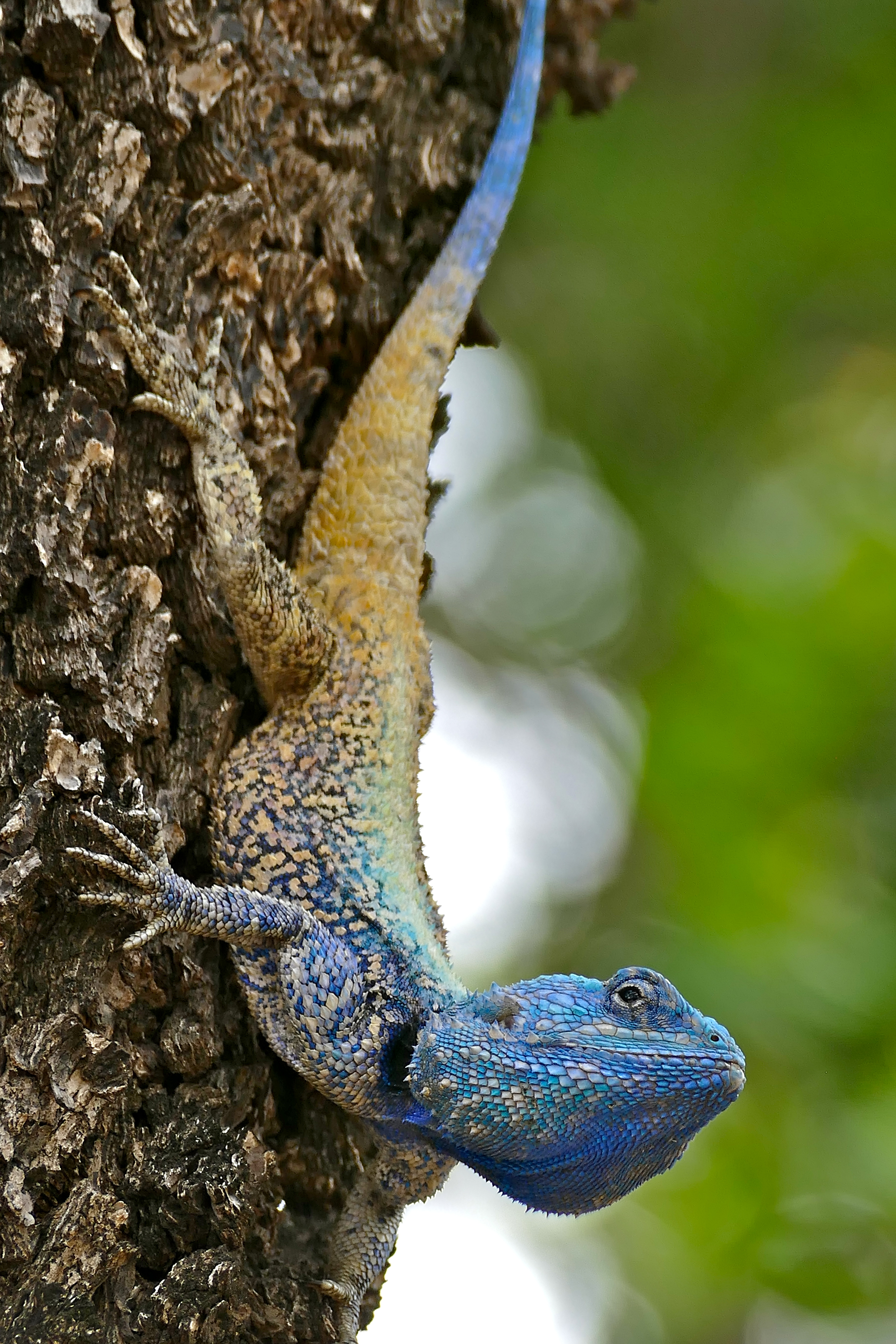
- Male in the Kruger National; Park, South Africa

Conservation status
- Least Concern (IUCN 3.1)

Scientific classification
- Kingdom: Animalia
- Phylum: Chordata
- Class: Reptilia
- Order: Squamata
- Suborder: Iguania
- Family: Agamidae
- Genus: Acanthocercus
- Species: A. atricollis

Binomial name
- Acanthocercus atricollis (Smith, 1849)
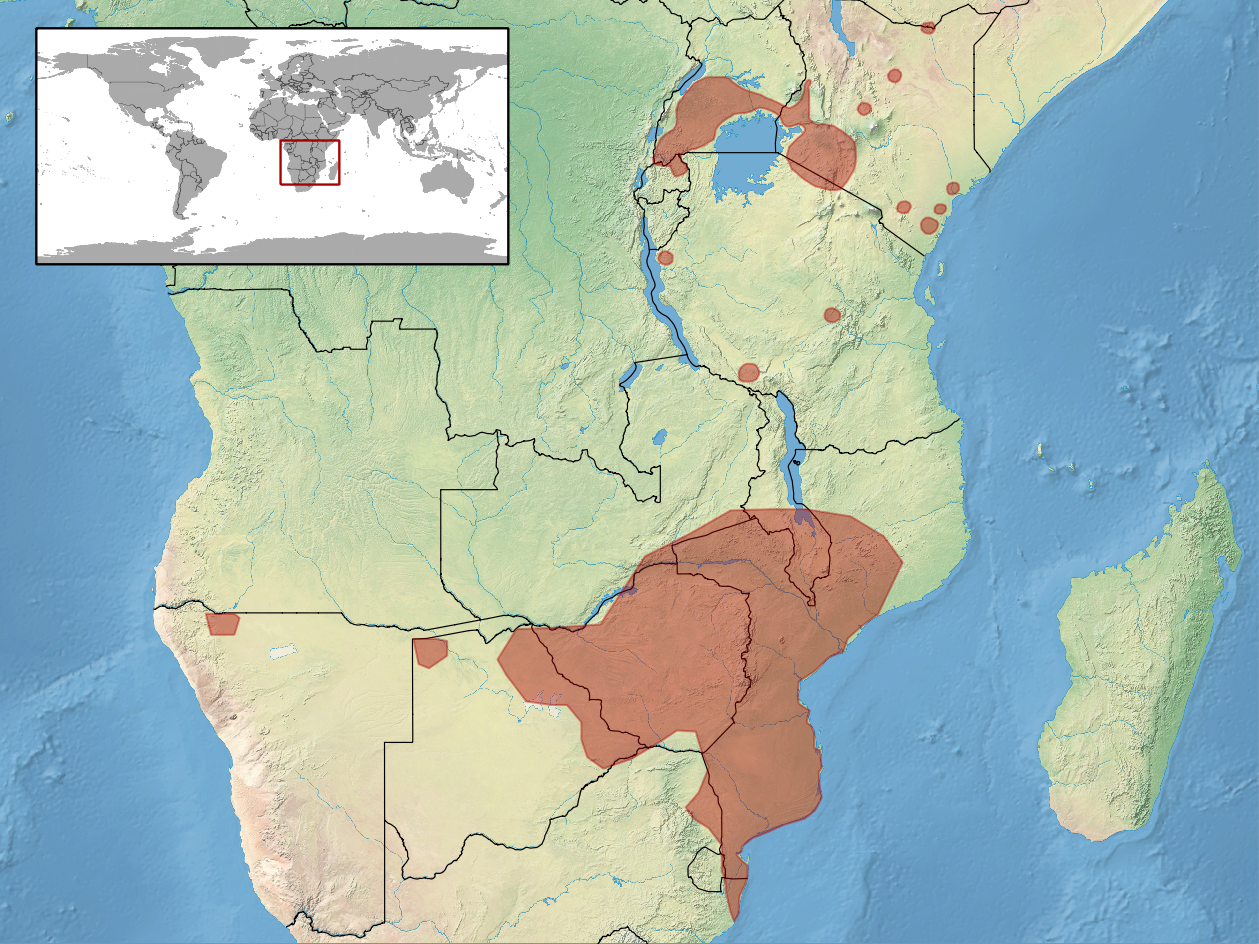

Synonyms
- Agama atricollis Smith, 1849; Laudakia atricollis (Smith, 1849); Stellio atricollis (Smith, 1849)

= Acanthocercus atricollis =

Black-necked agama

Species of reptile

Acanthocercus atricollis, the black-necked agama or southern tree agama, is a species of tree agama that is native to East, Central and southern Africa. Its largest continuous range is in southeastern Africa, and it occurs at high densities in the Kruger National Park.

== Description ==
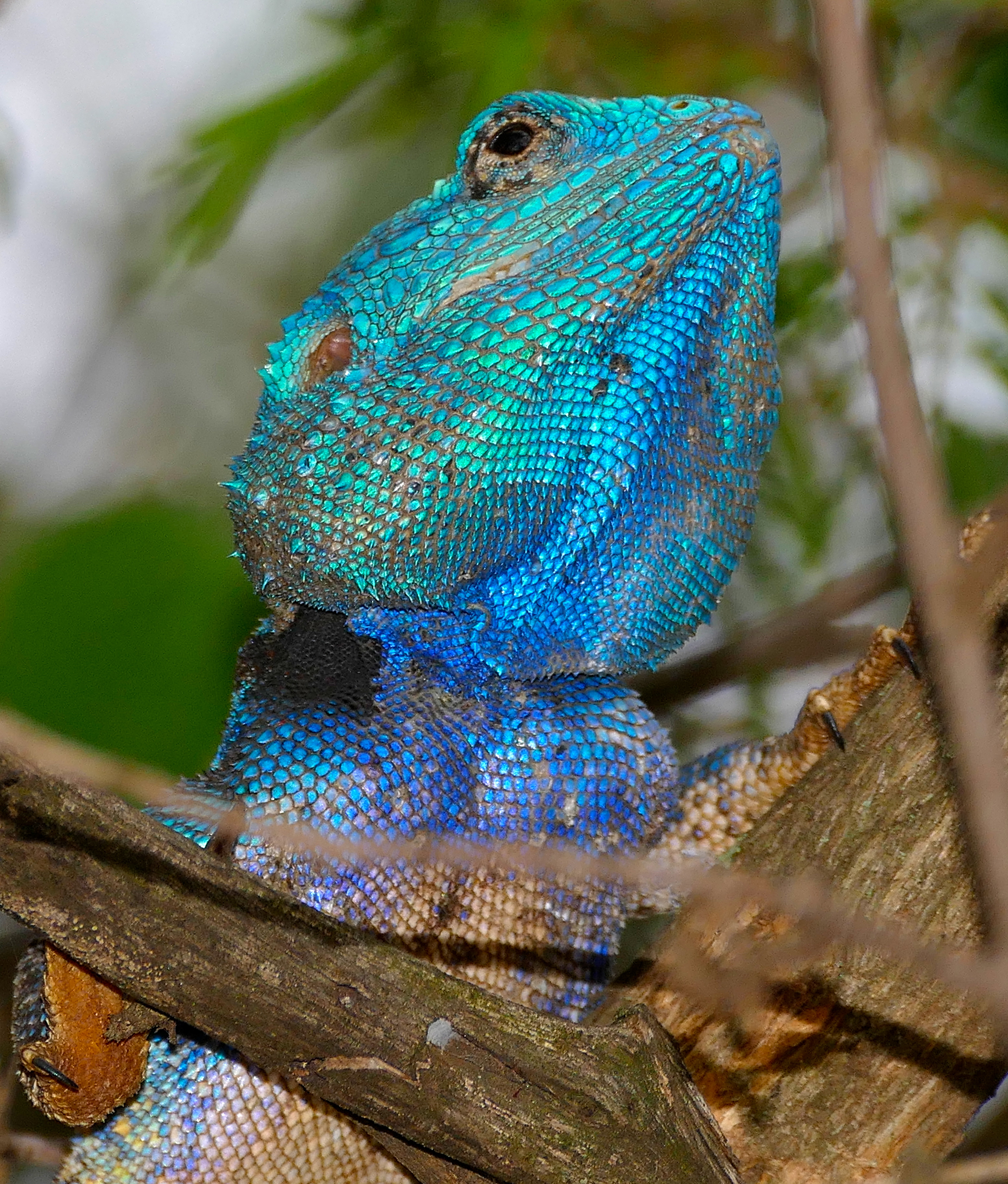
Black neck scales on an adult male

The sexes have a comparable snout-to-vent length (SVL) and have similar tail lengths. Mature males have somewhat larger heads than females, which is deemed to be an adaptation for intraspecific competition for territory. Females reach sexual maturity when about 96 mm (3.8 in) long (SVL) and males from about 82 mm (3.2 in) (SVL).

== Habits ==
They form structured colonies with a dominant male, several females and juveniles. The males defend territories and engage in combat. Although mostly diurnal, they sometimes exhibit nocturnal activity. It adapts readily to the vicinity of human habitation. They are classic ambush foragers which spend only some 4% of their time moving. This involves an average of less than one movement in two minutes. When stationary, the adults position themselves on lateral branches (42% of the time), on tree trunks (35%), or occasionally on the ground (23%).

Acanthocercus a. atricollis can more commonly be found in higher densities around villages. This is due to the lack of natural predators like snakes or raptors that are often killed by humans and the preference of trees that are thicker, with more canopy cover.

== Diet ==
They subsist on an insect diet, which consists mainly of orthopterans, beetles and ants. Their full diet encompasses various orders (10 recorded) of arthropods. They also eat millipedes, which other lizard taxa tend to avoid. Gut contents reveal many ants (92% of items) and some beetles (4%). A large volume of orthopterans is consumed (27%), followed by beetles (26%) and ants (18%). Juvenile diet (by volume) is dominated by ants, though beetles and orthopterans are also taken. Prey diversity and volumes fluctuate seasonally.

== Reproduction ==
Reproduction is seasonal. Testicular volume of males reaches a maximum during August to September (austral spring), and follicles of females become enlarged during August to December. Females lay a single clutch per annum, about 11 eggs on average, and larger females produce larger clutches than smaller females.

== Range ==
It is found in Eritrea, Somalia, Ethiopia, Sudan, South Sudan, Uganda, D.R.C., Kenya, Tanzania, Zambia, Malawi, Mozambique, Zimbabwe, Angola, Botswana, Namibia, South Africa and Eswatini.

== Subspecies ==
Two subspecies are usually accepted. Four more have been described however, which are not very distinct.

- A. a. atricollis (Smith, 1849) – Southern tree agama, of southern Africa
- A. a. loveridgei (Klausewitz, 1957) – Tanzania

== Gallery ==
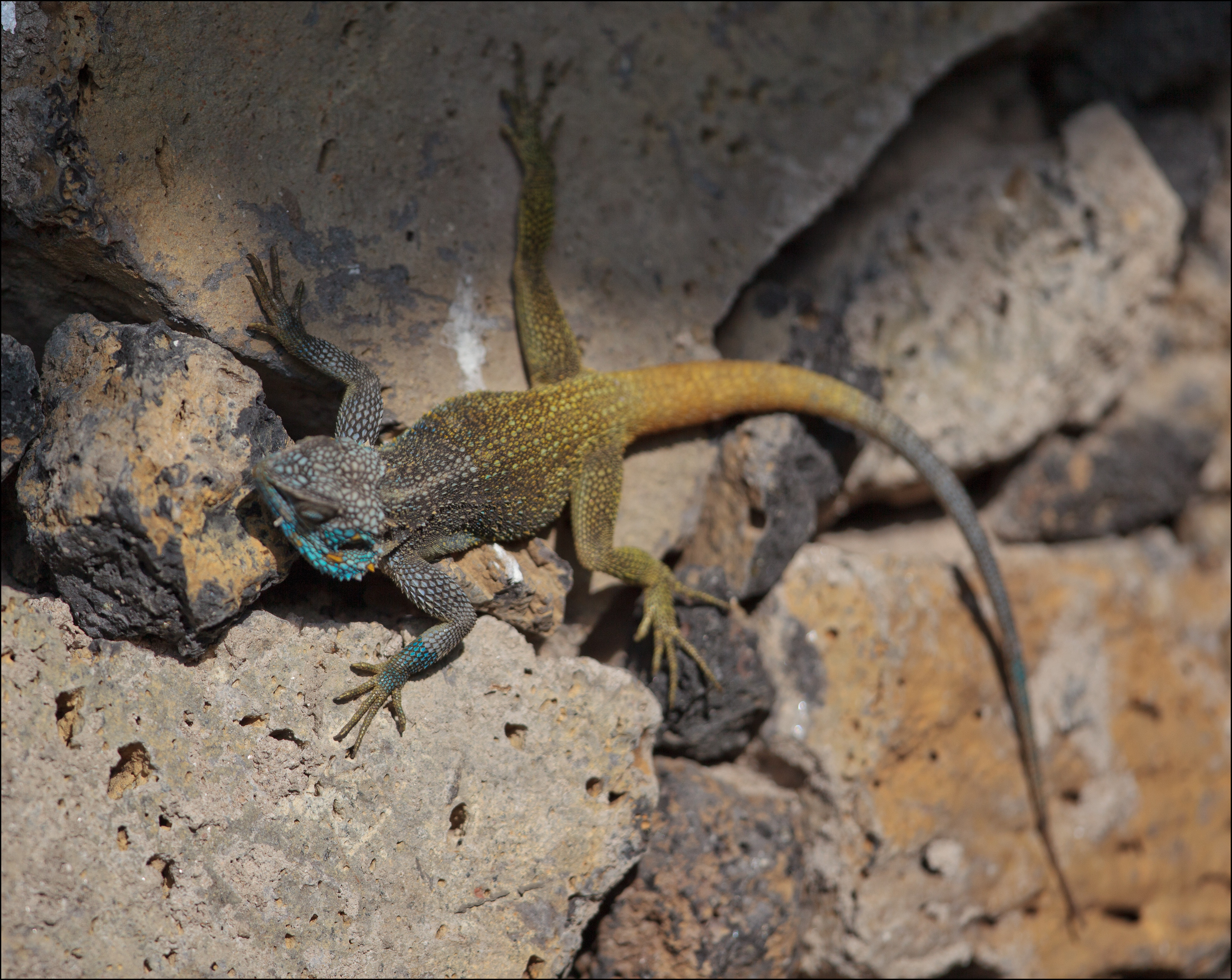
Proposed race A. a. kiwuensis (Klausewitz, 1957) at Lake Kivu

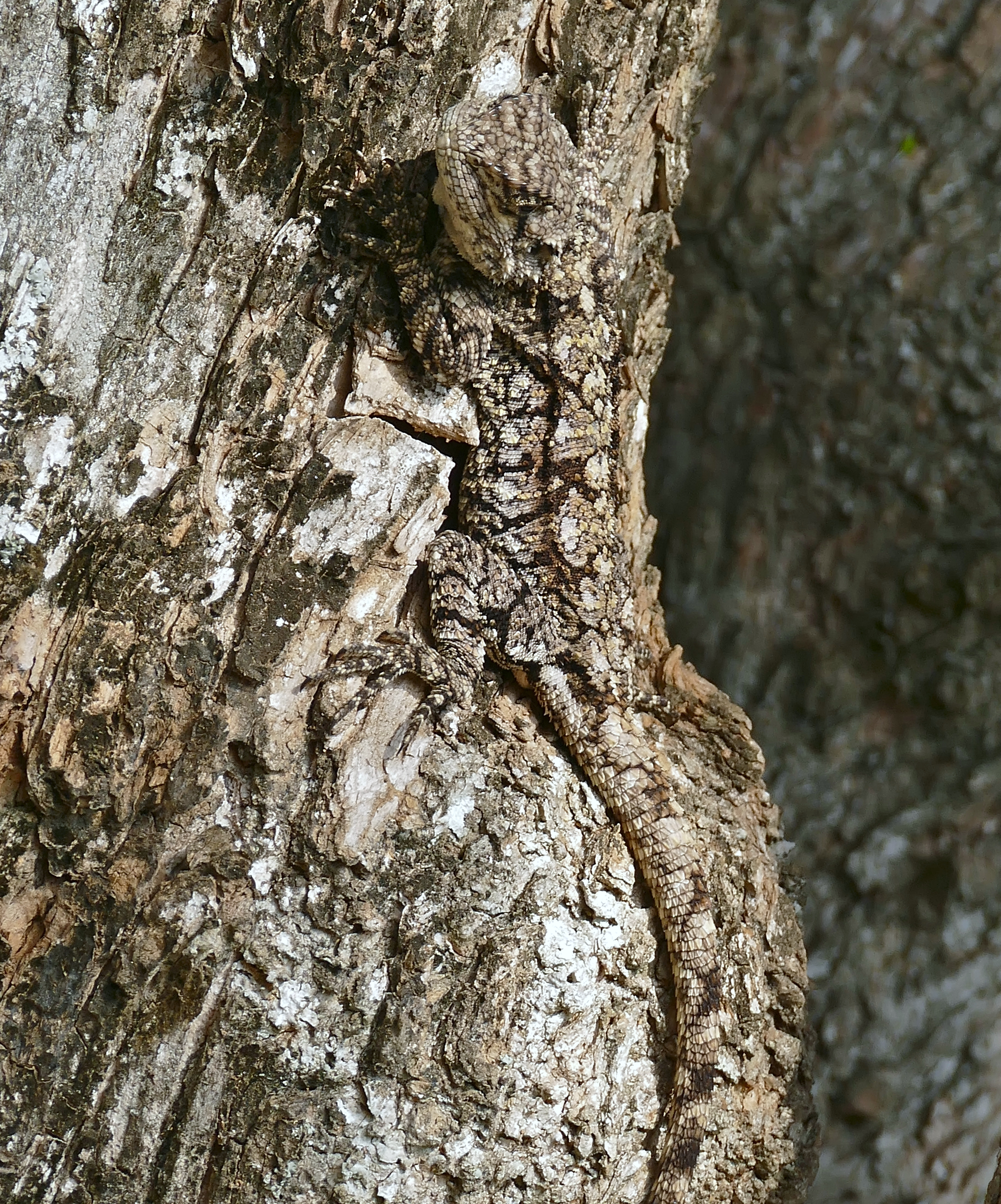
Camouflaged female

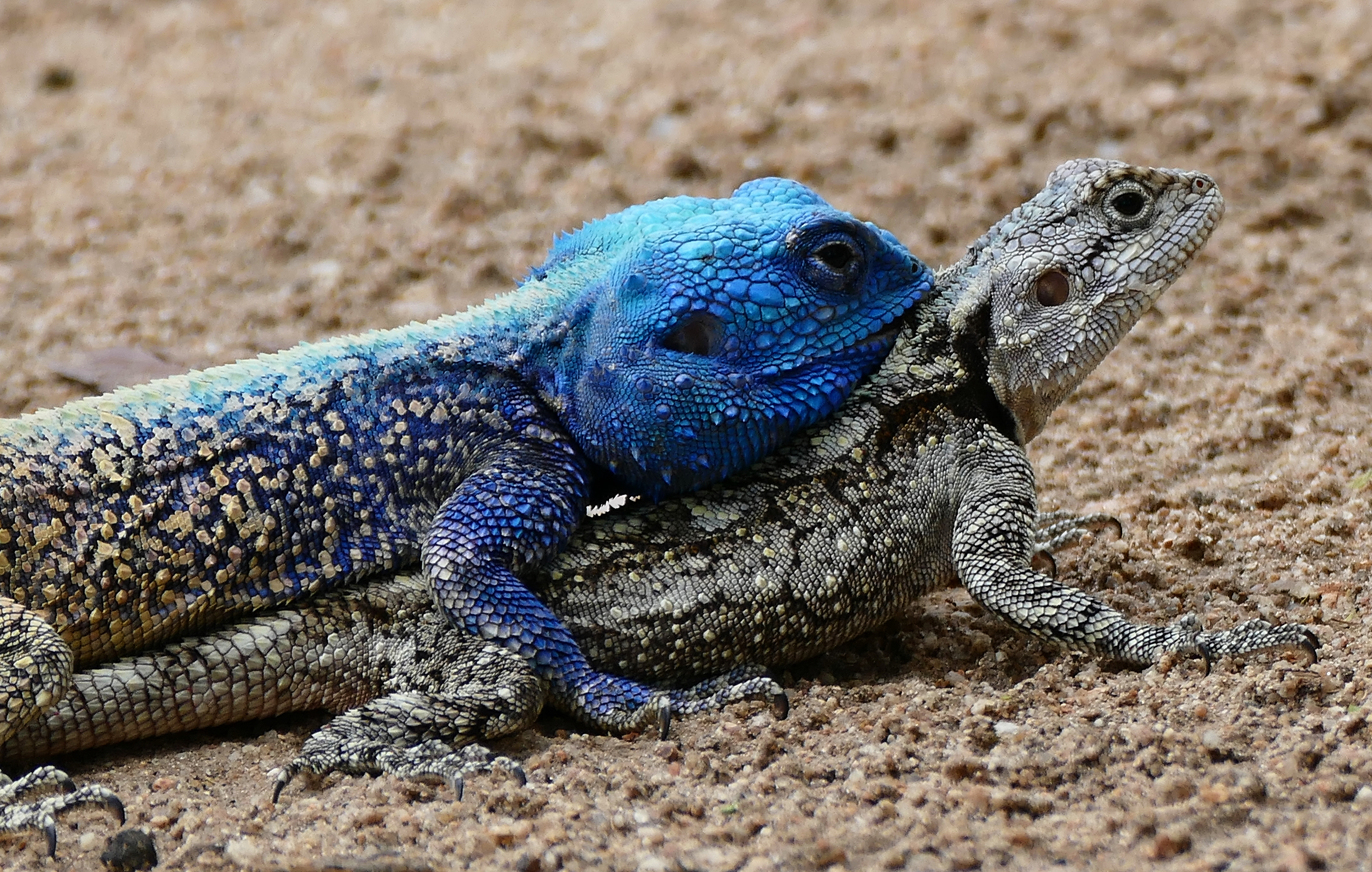
Breeding pair

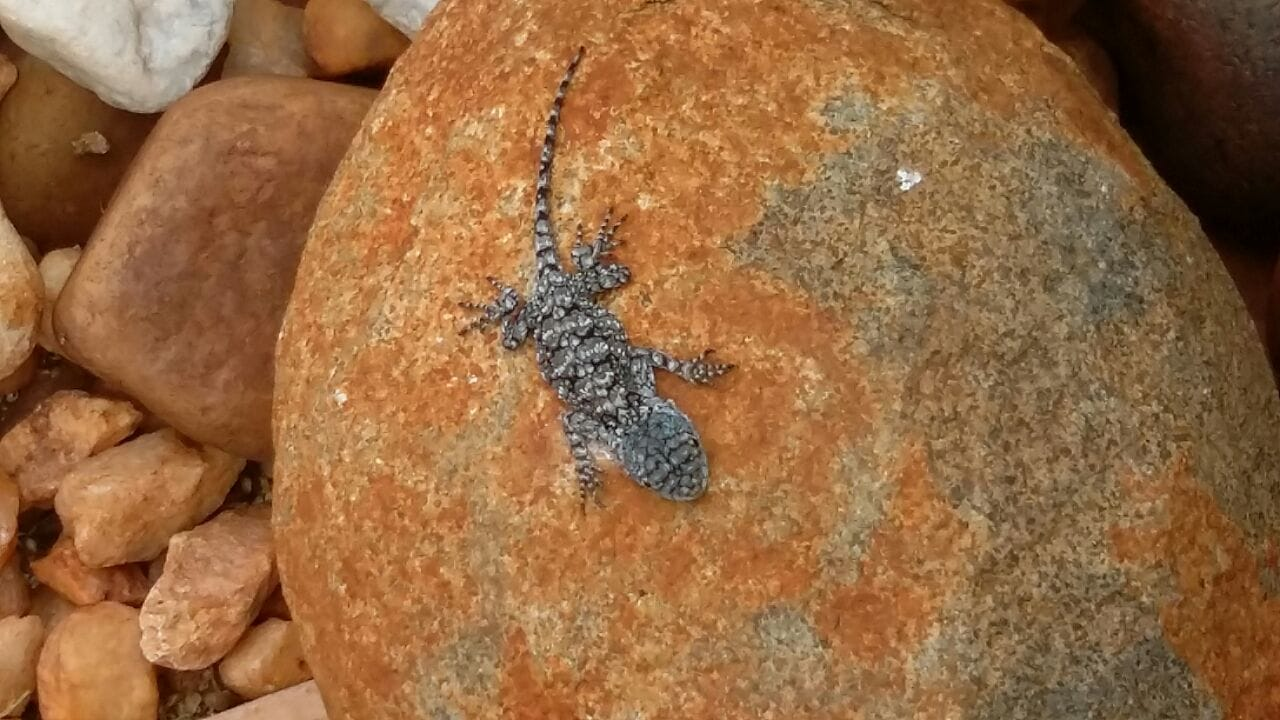
Juvenile

Media related to Acanthocercus atricollis at Wikimedia Commons
