= List of reptiles of South Africa =

List of recorded species of the reptilian fauna of South Africa

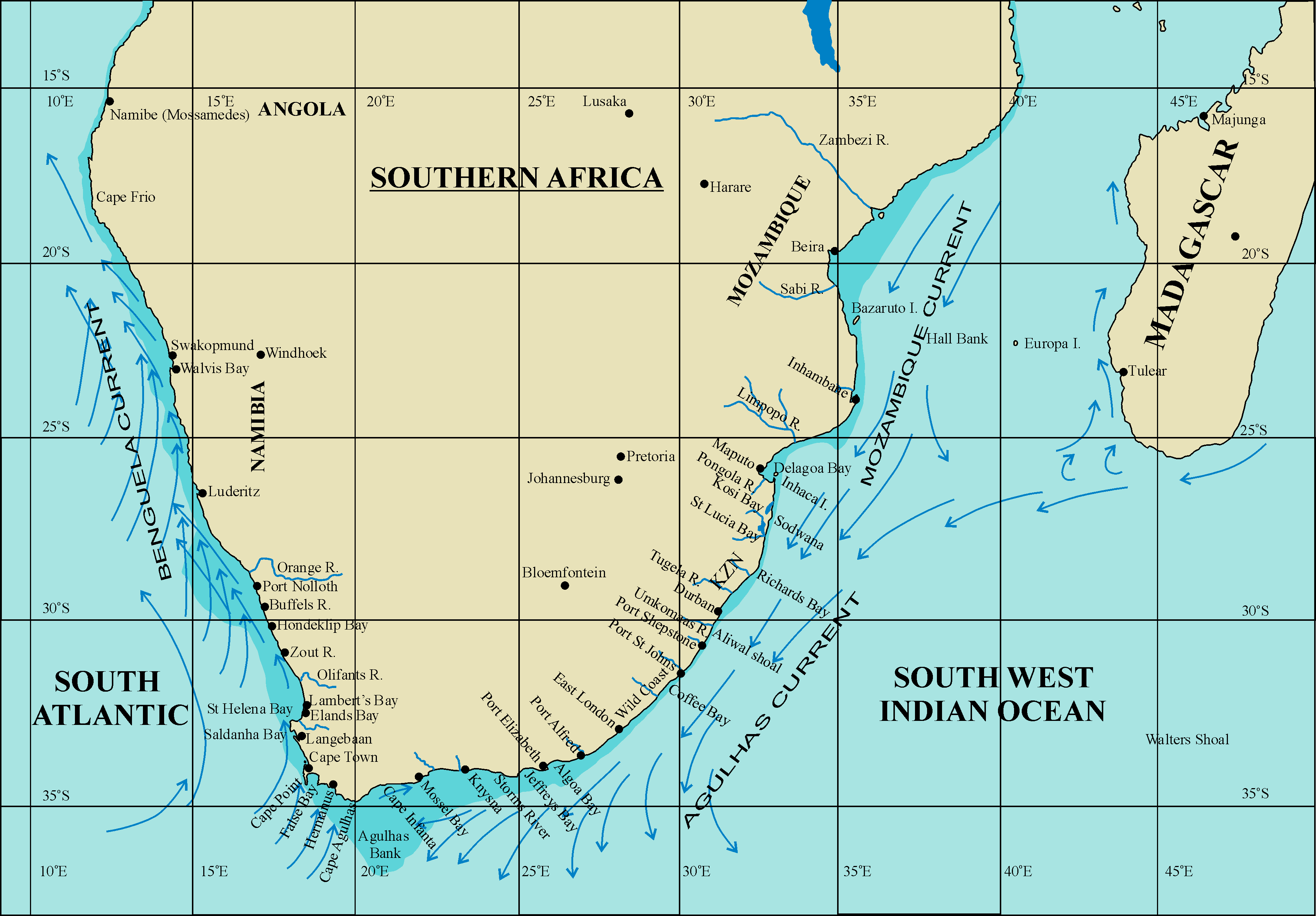
Map of the Southern African coastline showing some of the landmarks referred to in species range statements

The list of reptiles of South Africa is a list of species that form a part of the reptilian fauna of South Africa. The list follows the SANBI listing.

== Crocodylia ==
Order Crocodylia

=== Crocodylidae ===
Family Crocodylidae

- Genus Crocodylus:
  - Crocodylus niloticus Laurenti, 1768, Nile crocodile, syn. Crocodilus madagascariensis Grandidier, 1872, Crocodilus vulgaris madagascariensis Boettger, 1877
    - Crocodylus niloticus chamses Bory, 1824, Nile crocodile
    - Crocodylus niloticus cowiei (Smith in Hewitt, 1937), Nile crocodile, syn. Alligator cowiei Smith 1937
    - Crocodylus niloticus madagascariensis Grandidier, 1872, Nile crocodile
    - Crocodylus niloticus niloticus Laurenti, 1768, Nile crocodile, syn. Crocodilus complanatus Geoffroy 1827, Crocodilus hexaphractos Rüppell 1886, Crocodilus lacunosus Geoffroy 1827, Crocodilus marginatus Geoffroy 1827, Crocodilus multiscutatus Rüppell 1826, Crocodilus octophractus Rüppell 1831, Crocodilus vulgaris Cuvier 1807, Crocodylus niloticus Laurenti, 1768
    - Crocodylus niloticus pauciscutatus Deraniyagala, 1948, Nile crocodile
    - Crocodylus niloticus suchus Geoffroy, 1807, Nile crocodile, syn. Crocodylus suchus Schmitz 2003

== Squamata ==
Order Squamata

=== Agamidae ===
Family Agamidae

- Genus Acanthocercus:
  - Acanthocercus atricollis Smith, 1849, southern tree agama, syn. Acanthocercus atricollis Joger, 1991, Acanthocercus atricollis atricollis (Smith, 1849), Acanthocercus atricollis gregorii (Klausewitz, 1957), Acanthocercus atricollis kiwuensis (Klausewitz, 1957), Acanthocercus atricollis loveridge (Klausewitz, 1957), Acanthocercus atricollis minutus (Klausewitz, 1957), Acanthocercus atricollis ugandaensis (Klausewitz, 1957), Agama atricollis Smith 1849, Agama atricollis atricollis (Klausewitz, 1957), Agama atricollis gregorii (Klausewitz, 1957), Agama atricollis kiwuensis (Klausewitz, 1957), Agama atricollis loveridge (Klausewitz, 1957), Agama atricollis loveridgei (Klausewitz, 1957), Agama atricollis ugandaensis (Klausewitz, 1957), Agama cyanocephala Falk, 1925, Agama gregorii Günther, 1894, Laudakia atricollis Manthey & Schuster, 1999, Laudakia atricollis kuwuensis Manthey & Schuster, 1999, Stellio atricollis Broadley & Howell, 1991, Stellio capensis Duméril- Duméril et al., 1851, Stellio nigricollis Bocage, 1866
    - Acanthocercus atricollis gregorii (Klausewitz, 1957), blue-throated agama, syn. Agama atricollis Smith, 1849, Agama atricollis gregorii Klausewitz, 1957, Agama gregorii Günther, 1894
    - Acanthocercus atricollis kiwuensis (Klausewitz, 1957), blue-throated agama, syn. Agama atricollis Smith, 1849, Agama atricollis kiwuensis Klausewits, 1957
    - Acanthocercus atricollis ugandaensis (Klausewitz, 1957), blue-throated agama, syn. Stellio atricollis Lanza, 1990, Agama atricollis ugandaensis Klausewitz, 1957
    - Acanthocercus atricollis loveridgei (Klausewitz, 1957), blue-throated agama, Agama atricollis Smith, 1849, Agama atricollis loveridgei Klausewitz, 1957
    - Acanthocercus atricollis atricollis (A. Smith, 1849), blue-throated agama, syn. Agama atricollis Smith, 1849, Agama atricollis atricollis Klausewitz, 1957, Agama cyanocephala Falk, 1925, Stellio capensis Duméril, 1851, Stellio nigricollis Barboza, 1866
- Genus Agama:
  - Agama aculeata Merrem, 1820, ground agama, syn. Agama hispida aculeata Fitzsimmons, 1958, Agama infralineata, Saura spinalis Wagler, 1866
  - Agama aculeata aculeata Merrem, 1820, ground agama, Saura spinalis Wagler, 1866, Agama hispida aculeata Loveridge, 1936, endemic to southern Africa
  - Agama aculeata distanti (Boulenger, 1902), ground agama, syn. Agama aculeata Duméril & Bibron, 1837, Agama distanti Boulenger, 1902, Agama hispida distanti Boulenger 1902, endemic
  - Agama anchietae Bocage, 1896, western rock agama, syn. Agama anchietae methueni Boulenger & Power, 1921, Agama anchietae anchietae Auerbach, 1987
  - Agama armata Peters, 1855, tropical spiny agama, syn. Agama hispida armata Boulenger, 1921, Agama hispida mertensi Wermuth, 1967, Agama aculeata armata Auerbach, 1987
  - Agama atra Daudin, 1802, southern rock agama, syn. Agama ater Gray, 1831, syn. Agama microterolepis Boulenger, 1896, Phrynopsis atra Fitzinger, 1843, Saura spinalis Wagler, 1833, endemic to southern Africa
    - Agama atra atra Daudin, 1802, southern rock agama, Saura spinalis Wagler, 1833
    - Agama atra knobeli Boulenger & Power, 1921, southern rock agama, syn. Agama ater Gray, 1831, Agama knobeli, Agama anchietae knobeli Boulenger, 1921
  - Agama hispida (Kaup, 1827), common spiny agama, syn. Agama brachyura Boulenger, 1885, Lacerta hispida Linnaeus, 1758, Trapelus hispidus Kaup, 1827, near endemic
    - Agama hispida hispida Kaup, 1827, common spiny agama. syn, Agama hispida Boulenger, 1885
    - Agama hispida makarikari Fitzsimons, 1932, common spiny agama, syn. Trapelus hispidus Kaup, 1827, Agama makarikarica Barts, 2003, Agama hispida makarikarica Auerbach, 1987
  - Agama kirkii Boulenger, 1885, Kirk's rock agama
    - Agama kirkii fitzsimonsi Loveridge, 1950, Kirk's Rock agama
    - Agama kirkii kirkii Boulenger, 1885, Kirk's rock agama

=== Amphisbaenidae ===
Family Amphisbaenidae

- Genus Chirindia:
  - Chirindia langi (Fitzsimons, 1939), Lang's worm lizard
    - Chirindia langi langi (Fitzsimons, 1939), Lang's worm lizard, syn Chirindia langi Fitzsimons, 1939, near endemic
    - Chirindia langi occidentalis Jacobsen, 1984, Soutpansberg worm lizard, endemic
- Genus Dalophia:
  - Dalophia pistillum (Boettger, 1895), blunt-tailed worm lizard, syn Monopeltis pistillum Boettger, 1895, Dalophia transvaalensis Gans, 2005, Monopeltis colobura Boulenger, 1910, Monopeltis granti Boulenger, 1907, Monopeltis granti kuanyamarum Monard, 1937, Monopeltis granti transvaalensis Fitzsimons, 1933, Monopeltis jallae Peracca, 1910, Monopeltis mossambica Cott, 1934, Tomuropeltis granti Frank & Ramus, 1995, Tomuropeltis granti colobura, Tomuropeltis granti transvaalensis, Tomuropeltis jallae, Tomuropeltis pistillum Broadley, 1962, endemic
- Genus Monopeltis:
  - Monopeltis capensis A. Smith, 1848, Cape wedgesnouted worm lizard, syn. Lepidosternon capense Strauch, 1881, Monopeltis decosteri Boulenger, 1910, Monopeltis decosteri Boulenger, 1910, Monotrophis capensis Gray, 1965, near endemic
    - Monopeltis capensis capensis (Smith, 1848), Cape wedgesnouted worm lizard, syn. Monopeltis capensis Gray, 1865, Lepidosternon capense Strauch 1881, Monopeltis decosteri Boulenger 1910
    - Monopeltis capensis gazei Fitzsimons, 1937, Cape wedgesnouted worm lizard, syn. Lepidosternon capense Strauch, 1881
  - Monopeltis decosteri Boulenger, 1910, De Coster's worm lizard, syn. Monopeltis sphenorhynchus Peters 1879, Monopeltis capensis Smith, 1848, Monopeltis capensis Broadley 1971, Monopeltis sphenorhynchus Broadley 1962, endemic to southern Africa
  - Monopeltis leonhardi Werner, 1910, Kalahari worm lizard, syn. Monopeltis vernayi Fitzsimons, 1932, endemic to southern Africa
  - Monopeltis infuscata Broadley, 1997, infuscate wedge-snouted amphisbaenian, syn. Monopeltis sphenorhynchus Peters, 1879, Monopeltis capensis capensis Loveridge, 1941, Monopeltis capensis Peters, 1867, endemic to southern Africa
  - Monopeltis mauricei sphenorhynchus Parker, 1935, Maurice's worm lizard, syn. Monopeltis mauricei Parker 1935, Monopeltis ocularis Fitzsimons 1941
  - Monopeltis sphenorhynchus Peters, 1879, slender worm lizard, syn. Lepidosternon sphenorhynchum Gray, 1865, Monopeltis capensis gazei Fitsimmons, 1937, Monopeltis habenichti Fitsimmons, 1937, endemic to southern Africa
    - Monopeltis sphenorhynchus mauricei Parker, 1935, syn. Monopeltis habenichti Fitzsimons, 1937, Monopeltis mauricei Parker 1935, Monopeltis ocularis Fitzsimmons, 1941
    - Monopeltis sphenorhynchus sphenorhynchus Peters, 1879, syn. Monopeltis sphenorhynchus Peters, 1879
- Genus Zygaspis:
  - Zygaspis quadrifrons (Peters, 1862), Kalahari round-snouted worm lizard, syn. Zygaspis quadrifrons quadrifrons Peters, 1862, Amphisbaena capensis Thominot, 1887, Amphisbaena dolichomenta dolichomenta Witte & Laurent, 1942, Amphisbaena dolichomenta meridionalis Witte & Laurent, 1942, Amphisbaena quadrifrons Laurent, 1947, Amphisbaena quadrifrons capensis Loveridge, 1941, Amphisbaena quadrifrons katangae Witte & Laurent, 1942, Amphisbaena violacea Peters, 1854, Shrevea quadrifrons Vanzolini, 1951, Zygaspis arenicola Gans, 2005, Zygaspis dolichomenta Broadley & Broadley, 1997, Zygaspis vandami Gans, 2005, Zygaspis vandami arenicola Broadley & Broadley, 1997, Zygaspis vandami vandami Broadley & Broadley, 1997, Zygaspis violacea Wever & Gans, 1973, Zygaspis violacea vandami Loveridge, 1951, Zygaspis violacea vandami Welch, 1982, Amphisbaena ambuellensis Monard, 1931
    - Zygaspis quadrifrons capensis (Thominot, 1887), Kalahari round-snouted worm lizard, syn. Amphisbaena ambuellensis Monard, 1931, Amphisbaena capensis Thominot, 1887, Amphisbaena quadrifrons capensis Loveridge, 1941, Shrevea quadrifrons Vanzolili 1951
    - Zygaspis quadrifrons dolichomenta (Witte & Laurent, 1942), Kalahari round-snouted worm lizard, syn. Amphisbaena quadrifrons Peters, 1862, Amphisbaena dolichomenta dolichomenta Witte & Laurent, 1942, Amphisbaena dolichomenta meridionalis Witte & Laurent, 1942, Zygaspis dolichomenta Broadley & Broadley, 1997, Amphisbaena quadrifrons capensis Loveridge, 1941
    - Zygaspis quadrifrons quadrifrons (Peters, 1862), Kalahari round-snouted worm lizard, syn. Amphisbaena quadrifrons Peters, 1862
  - Zygaspis vandami (Fitzsimons, 1930), syn. Amphisbaena vandami Fitzsimons, 1930, Zygaspis violacea vandami Fitzsimons, 1943, endemic to southern Africa
    - Zygaspis vandami arenicola Broadley & Broadley, 1997' Maputoland dwarf worm lizard. syn. Zygaspis violacea vandami Fitzsimons, 1943, Amphisbaena violacea Peters, 1854, Zygaspis violacea Wever, 1973
    - Zygaspis vandami vandami (Fitzsimons, 1930), Van Dam's dwarf worm lizard, syn. Amphisbaena vandami Fitzsimons, 1930

=== Atractaspididae ===
Family Atractaspididae

- Genus Amblyodipsas:
  - Amblyodipsas concolor (A. Smith, 1849), Natal purple-glossed snake, syn. Choristodon (Choristocalamus) concolor Smith, 1849, Calamelaps concolor Boulenger, 1896 endemic
  - Amblyodipsas microphthalma Bianconi, 1852, eyeless purple-glossed snake, syn. Calamaria microphthalma Bianconi, 1852
  - Amblyodipsas microphthalma microphthalma (Bianconi, 1850), eastern purple-glossed snake, syn. Calamaria microphthalma Biancon, 1852
    - Amblyodipsas microphthalma nigra Jacobsen, 1986, black white-lipped snake, Soutpansberg purple-glossed snake, endemic
  - Amblyodipsas polylepis Bocage, 1873, common purple-glossed snake, syn. Calamelaps polylepis Bocage, 1873, Atractaspis polylepis, Calamelaps unicolor Fitzsimons, 1992
    - Amblyodipsas polylepis hildebrandtii (Peter, 1877), common purple-glossed snake Amblyodipsas polylepis Welch, 1994, Atractaspis hildebrandtii Peters, 1877, Atractaspis polylepis Bauer, 1995, Calamelaps unicolor unicolor Loveridge, 1957
    - Amblyodipsas polylepis polylepis Bocage, 1873, common purple-glossed snake, syn. Calamelaps unicolor Fitzsimons, 1992, Calamelaps unicolor unicolor Loveridge, 1957, Calamelaps miolepis Günther, 1888
- Genus Aparallactus:
  - Aparallactus capensis (A. Smith, 1849), Cape centipede eater, syn. Aparallactus lübberti Sternfeld, 1910, Uriechis capensis Günther, 1888
    - Aparallactus capensis bocagei Boulenger, 1895, Cape centipede eater, syn. Elapomorphus capensis Smith, 1849, Aparallactus bocagii Boulenger, 1895
    - Aparallactus capensis capensis Smith, 1849, Cape centipede eater, syn. Uriechis capensis Günther, 1888
    - Aparallactus capensis luebberti Sternfeld, 1910, Cape centipede eater, syn. Aparallactus capensis Boulenger, 1895
    - Aparallactus capensis punctatolineatus Boulenger, 1895, Cape centipede eater, syn. Aparallactus capensis Sternfeld, 1910, Aparallactus punctatolineatus Boulenger, 1895
  - Aparallactus lunulatus Peters, 1854, reticulated centipede eater, syn. Uriechis lunulatus Peters, 1854, Aparallactus concolor Boulenger, 1895, Aparallactus concolor boulengeri Scortecci, 1931, Uriechis concolor Fischer, 1884
    - Aparallactus lunulatus lunulatus (Peters, 1854), reticulated centipede eater, syn. Uriechis concolor
    - Aparallactus lunulatus nigrocollaris Chabanaud, 1916, reticulated centipede eater, syn. Uriechis lunulatus Peters, 1854, Aparallactus nigrocollaris Chabanaud, 1916
    - Aparallactus lunulatus scortecci Parker, 1949, reticulated centipede eater, syn. Uriechis concolor
- Genus Atractaspis:
  - Atractaspis bibronii A. Smith, 1849, Bibron's burrowing asp, syn. Atractaspis irregularis bibronii Boettger, 1887, Atractaspis katangae Boulenger, 1910, Atractaspis coarti Boulenger, 1910, Atractaspis irregularis Boettger, 1887, Atractaspis rostrata Günther, 1868
    - Atractaspis bibroni bibroni Smith, 1849, southern burrowing asp, syn. Atractaspis inornatus Smith, 1849
    - Atractaspis bibroni rostrata Günther, 1868, southern burrowing asp, syn. Atractaspis bibronii Smith, 1849, Atractaspis rostrata Günther, 1868
  - Atractaspis duerdeni Gough 1907, beaked burrowing asp, syn. Atractaspis duerdeni Gough, 1907
- Genus Macrelaps:
  - Macrelaps microlepidotus (Günther, 1860), syn. Atractaspis natalensis Peters, 1877, Uriechis microlepidotus Günther, 1860, endemic
- Genus Xenocalamus:
  - Xenocalamus bicolor Günther, 1868, slender quill-snouted snake
  - Xenocalamus bicolor (Werne, 1915), slender quill-snouted snake
    - Xenocalamus bicolor australis Fitzsimons, 1946, Waterberg quill-snouted snake, syn. Xenocalamus bicolor Günther, 1868, endemic
    - Xenocalamus bicolor bicolor Günther, 1868, bicoloured quill-snouted snake, syn. Xenocalamus bicolor Auerbach, 1987 endemic
    - Xenocalamus bicolor concavorostralis Hoffman, 1940, slender quill-snouted snake, syn. Xenocalamus bicolor Günther, 1868
    - Xenocalamus bicolor lineatus Roux, 1907, slender quill-snouted snake, syn. Xenocalamus bicolor bicolor Günther, 1868
    - Xenocalamus bicolor machadoi Laurent, 1954, slender quill-snouted snake, syn. Xenocalamus bicolor pernasutus (Werner, 1915)
    - Xenocalamus bicolor maculatus Fitzsimons, 1937, slender quill-snouted snake, syn. Michaela pernasuta Werner, 1915
  - Xenocalamus lineatus Roux, 1907, striped quill-snouted snake
  - Xenocalamus sabiensis Broadley, 1971, Sabi quill-snouted snake, endemic to southern Africa
  - Xenocalamus transvaalensis Methuen, 1919, Transvaal quill-snouted snake, near endemic

=== Chamaelionidae ===
Family Chamaeleonidae

- Genus Bradypodion:
  - Bradypodion dracomontanum Raw, 1976, Drakensberg dwarf chameleon, endemic
  - Bradypodion gutturale Smith, 1849, Robertson dwarf chameleon, syn. Chamaeleo gutturalis Smith, 1849, Chamaeleon gutturalis Werner, 1911, Chamaeleo pumilus gutturalis Hillenius, 1959, Bradypodion ventrale gutturale Branch, 1998, Bradypodion pumilum gutturale Klaver, 1997, endemic
  - Bradypodion kentanicum (Hewitt, 1935), Kentani dwarf chameleon, syn. Lophosaura melanocephala Hewitt, 1935, endemic
  - Bradypodion melanocephalum Gary, 1865, black-headed dwarf chameleon, syn. Microsaura melanocephala Gray, 1865, Chamaeleon melanocephalus Werner, 1911, Chamaeleo pumilus melanocephalus Hillenius, 1959, Bradypodion pumilum melanocephalum Böhme & Klaver, 1997, Bradypodion kentanicum Stuartfox, 2007, Lophosaura melanocephala kentamica Mertens, 1966, Lophosaura melanocephala kentanica Hewitt, 1935, endemic
    - Bradypodion pumilum ventrale (Gray, 1845), Cape dwarf chameleon, syn. Chamaeleo pumilus Mertens, 1966
    - Bradypodion pumilum caffer (Boettger, 1889), Cape dwarf chameleon, syn. Chamaeleo thermophilus Gravenhorst, 1807
    - Bradypodion pumilum occidentale (Hewitt, 1935), Cape dwarf chameleon, syn. Chamaeleon punilus Angel, 1929
    - Bradypodion pumilum pumilum (Gmelin, 1789), Cape dwarf chameleon, syn. Lacerta pumila Gmelin in Linnaeus, 1789, Chameleo pumillus pumillus Hillenius, 1959, Bradypodion pumilum pumilum Klaver & Böhme, 1997, Chamaeleo margaritaceus Merrem, 1820
    - Bradypodion pumilum taeniabronchum (A. Smith, 1831), Cape dwarf chameleon, syn. Chamaeleo pusillus var. ? Gray, 1865, endemic
  - Bradypodion transvaalense Fitzsimons, 1930, Wolkberg dwarf chameleon, syn. Chamaeleon trasvaalensis Fitzsimons, 1930, Chamaeleo natalensis Poeppig, 1866, Microsauria pumila transvaalensis (Boycott, 1992), endemic
  - Bradypodion atromontanum Branch, Tolley & Tilbury, 2006, Swartberg dwarf chameleon, endemic
  - Bradypodion caeruleogula Raw & Brothers, 2008, Eshowe dwarf chameleon, Umlazi dwarf chameleon, endemic
  - Bradypodion caffrum (Boettger, 1889), Transkei dwarf chameleon, syn. Bradypodion caffrum Boettger, 1889, Bradypodion pumilum caffer Klaver, 1997, Chamaeleo pumilus caffer Hillenius, 1959, Chamaeleon caffer Boettger, 1889, endemic
  - Bradypodion damaranum (Boulenegr, 1887), Knysna dwarf chameleon, syn. Chamaeleon damaranus Boulenger, 1887, Chamaeleo pumilus damaranus Hillenius, 1959, Chamaeleo pumilus damaranus Mertens, 1966, Bradypodion damaranums Raw, 1976, Bradypodion pumilum damaranum Klaver & Böhme, 1997, Bradypodion damaranums Necas, 1999, endemic
  - Bradypodion nemorale Raw, 1978, Zululand dwarf chameleon, syn. Bradypodion caeruleogula Raw & Brothers, 2008, endemic
  - Bradypodion ngomeense Tilbury & Tolley, 2009, Ngome dwarf chameleon, endemic
  - Bradypodion occidentale Hewitt, 1935, Namaqua dwarf chameleon, syn. Lophosaura ventralis occidentalis Hewitt, 1935, Lophosaura ventralis Brock, 1941, endemic
  - Bradypodion pumilum (Gmelin, 1789), Cape dwarf chameleon, syn. Chamaeleo margaritaceus Merrem, 1820, Chamaeleo pumilus Duméril, 1836, Chamaeleo pusillus Gray, 1865, Chamaeleo thermophilus Gravenhorst, 1807, Chamaeleon bonae spei Laurenti, 1768, Chamaeleon punilus Angel, 1929, Chameleo pumillus Gray, 1831, Lacerta pumila Gmelin, 1789, Lophosaura pumila Gray, 1865, Lophosaura pumila fordii Gray, 1865
    - Bradypodion pumilum gutturale (Smith, 1849), Cape dwarf chameleon Chamaeleo pumilus Duméril & Bibron, 1836
    - Bradypodion pumilum karrooicum (Methuen & Hewitt, 1915), Cape dwarf chameleon Lophosaura pumila var. fordii Gray, 1865
    - Bradypodion pumilum damaranum (Boulenger, 1887), Cape dwarf chameleon, syn. Chamaeleo pumillus Gray, 1831
    - Bradypodion pumilum melanocephalum (Gray, 1865), Cape dwarf chameleon, syn. Lophosaura pumila Gray, 1865
    - Bradypodion pumilum transvaalense (Fitzsimons, 1930), Cape dwarf chameleon, syn. Microsaura pumila Engelbrecht, 1951
  - Bradypodion rawi, endemic
  - Bradypodion setaroi Raw, 1976 Setaro's dwarf chameleon, syn. Chamaeleo pumilus setaroi Hofman, Maxson & Arnyzen, 1991, endemic
  - Bradypodion taeniabronchum Smith, 1831 Smith's dwarf chameleon, syn. Chaemelio taeniabronchus Smith, 1831, endemic
  - Bradypodion thamnobates Raw, 1976 Natal Midlands dwarf chameleon, endemic
  - Bradypodion ventrale Gray, 1845 Southern dwarf chameleon, syn. Chamaeleo ventralis Gray, 1845, endemic
- Genus Chamaeleo:
  - Chamaeleo dilepis Leach, 1819, flapneck chameleon, syn. Chamaeleo angusticoronatus Barbour, 1903, Chamaeleo bilobus Kuhl, 1820, Chamaeleo capellii Bocage, 1866, Chamaeleo dilepas Martin, 1838, Chamaeleo petersii kirkii Gray, 1865, Chamaeleo planiceps Merrem, 1820, Chamaeleo (Chamaeleo) dilepis Necas, 1999, Chamaeleon dilepis Gray, 1865
    - Chamaeleo dilepis idjwiensis Loveridge, 1942, flapneck chameleon, syn. Chamaeleo peterkirkii Gray, 1865
    - Chamaeleo dilepis isabellinus Günther, 1893, flapneck chameleon, syn. Chamaeleo capellii Bocage, 1866
    - Chamaeleo dilepis petersii Gray, 1865, flapneck chameleon, syn. Chamaeleo bilobus Kuhl, 1820
    - Chamaeleo dilepis quilensis Bocage, 1866, Bocage's chameleon, syn. Chamaeleo quilensis Bocage, 1866, Chamaeleon parvilobus Boulenger, 1887, Chamaeleo (Chamaeleo) quilensis Necas, 1999
  - Chamaeleo namaquensis Smith, 1831, Namaqua chameleon, syn. Chamaeleo capensis Bonnaterre, 1789, Chaemelio namaquensis Smith, 1831, Chamaeleo tuberculiferus Gray, 1845, Phumanola namaquensis Gray, 1865, Chamaeleon namaquensis Werner, 1911, Chamaeleo (Chamaeleo) namaquensis Klaver & Böhme, 1986, endemic to southwestern parts of Africa
- Genus Rhampholeon:
  - Rhampholeon gorongosae Broadley, 1971 Rhampholeon marshalli gorongosae, endemic

=== Colubridae ===
Family Colubridae

- Genus Amplorhinus:
  - Amplorhinus multimaculatus A. Smith, 1847, many-spotted snake, syn. Dipsas smithii Duméril & Bibron, 1854, Coronella multimaculatus Günther, 1858, Psammophylax multimaculatus Jan, 1863, near endemic
- Genus Crotaphopeltis:
  - Crotaphopeltis hotamboeia (Laurenti, 1768), red-lipped herald, syn. Coronella hotamboeia Laurenti, 1768, Coronella rufescens Schlegel, 1837, Crotaphopeltis bicolor (Leach, 1819), Crotaphopeltis hotamboeia hotamboeia Loveridge, 1937, Crotaphopeltis rufescens Bocage, 1866, Dipsas inornatus Smith, 1849, Heterurus rufescens Duméril & Bibron, 1854, Leptodira hotamboeia Peracca, 1897, Leptodira hitamboeia Boulenger, 1897, Leptodeira hotamboeia Schmidt, 1923, Leptodira rufescens Boettger, 1893, Tarbophis barnum-browni Bogert, 1940, Dipsas inornatus Smith, 1849, Crotaphopeltis hotamboeia ruziziensis Laurent, 1956, Crotaphopeltis hotamboeia Broadley, 1968, Crotaphopeltis bicolor (Leach, 1819)
- Genus Dasypeltis:
  - Dasypeltis inornata A. Smith, 1849, southern brown egg eater, syn. Rachiodon inornatus Duméril, Bibron & Duméril, 1854, Dasypeltis inornatus Smith, 1849, Dasypeltis inornata Boycott, 1992, endemic
  - Dasypeltis medici medici (Bianconi, 1859), East African egg-eater
  - Dasypeltis scabra (Linnaeus, 1758), common egg-eater, syn. Coluber scaber Linnaeus, 1758, Anodon typus Smith, 1828, Dasypeltis lineolata Peters, 1878, Dasypeltis palmarum Trape & Roux-Estéve, 1992, Dasypeltis scaber breviceps Peters, 1864, Dasypeltis scaber capensis Peters, 1864, Dasypeltis scaber mossambicus Peters, 1864, Dasypeltis scabra palmarum Werner, 1884, Tropidonotus scaber Schlegel, 1837, Dasypeltis scabra Wagler, 1830, Rachiodon scaber Duméril, Bibron & Duméril 1854, Rachiodon scaber Bocage, 1866
    - Dasypeltis scabra loveridgei Mertens, 1954, common egg-eater, syn. Dasypeltis scabra Wagler, 1830
    - Dasypeltis scabra scabra Linnaeus, 1758, common egg-eater, syn. Dasypeltis palmarum Leach, 1818
- Genus Dipsadoboa:
  - Dipsadoboa aulica (Günther, 1864), marbled tree snake, syn. Chamaetortus aulicus Günther, 1864, Chamaetortus aulicus aulicus Broadley, 1962, Dipsadoboa aulica Rasmussen, 1989, Dipsadoboa aulica aulica Boycott, 1992, Dipsadoboa aulica Broadley & Howell, 1991, Dipsadoboa aulica Mattison, 2007
- Genus Dipsina:
  - Dipsina multimaculata (A. Smith, 1847), dwarf beaked snake, syn. Coronella multimaculata Smith, 1847, Rhamphiophis multimaculatus Sternfeld, 1910, endemic to southern Africa
- Genus Dispholidus:
  - Dispholidus typus (A. Smith, 1828), boomslang, syn. Bucephalus typus Smith, 1828, Bucephalus capensis Smith, 1841, Bucephalus viridis Smith, 1828, Bucephalus bellii Smith, 1828, Bucephalus gutturalis Smith, 1828, Bucephalus jardineii Smith, 1828, Bucephalus typus Duméril & Bibron, 1854, Bucephalus capensis Günther, 1888, Dispholidus typus typus Auerbach, 1987, endemic to sub-Saharan Africa
    - Dispholidus typus typus (Smith, 1829), boomslang
    - Dispholidus typus kivuensis Laurent, 1955, boomslang
    - Dispholidus typus punctatus Laurent, 1955, boomslang
- Genus Duberria:
  - Duberria lutrix Linnaeus, 1758, common slug eater, syn. Coluber lutrix Linnaeus, 1758, Homalosoma lutrix Duméril & Bibron, 1854, Homalosoma abyssinicum Boulenger, 1894, Duberria lutrix lutrix Boycott, 1992, Duberria lutrix atriventris (Sternfeld, 1912), Homalosoma lutrix atriventris Sternfeld, 1912, Duberria lutrix atriventris Broadley & Howell, 1991, Duberria lutrix basilewskyi Skelton-Bourgeios, 1961, Duberria lutrix rhodesiana Broadley, 1958, Duberria lutrix shirana (Boulenger, 1894), Homalosoma shiranum Boulenger, 1894, Duberria shirana Broadley et al. 2004
    - Duberria lutrix lutrix (Linnaeus, 1758), common slug eater, Duberria lutrix Linnaeus, 1758, endemic
    - Duberria lutrix abyssinica (Boulenger, 1849), common slug eater, syn. Homalosoma lutrix Duméril & Bibron, 1854
    - Duberria lutrix atriventris (Sternfeld, 1912), common slug eater, syn. Homalosoma abyssinicum Boulenger, 1894
    - Duberria lutrix basilewskyi Skelton-Bourgeois, 1961, common slug eater, Duberria lutrix lutrix (Linnaeus, 1758)
    - Duberria lutrix currylindahli Laurent, 1956, common slug eater, syn. Duberria lutrix Linnaeus, 1758
    - Duberria lutrix rhodesiana Broadley, 1958, Zimbabwean slug eater, syn. Duberria lutrix atriventris (Sternfeld, 1912)
    - Duberria lutrix shirana (Boulenger, 1894) common slug eater, syn. Homalosoma lutrix var. atriventris Sternfeld, 1912, Duberria lutrix shiranum Loveridge, 1936, Duberria shirana Broadley et al., 2004, Homalosoma shiranum Boulenger, 1894
  - Duberria variegata (Peters, 1854), variegated slug eater, syn. Homalosoma variegatum Peters, 1854, Duberria variegata Bauer et al., 1995, endemic
- Genus Gonionotophis:
  - Gonionotophis nyassae Günther, 1888, black file snake, syn. Simocephalus nyassae Günther, 1888, Gonionotophis degrijsi Werner, 1906
  - Gonionotophis capensis Smith, 1847, Cape file snake, syn. Heterolepis capensis Smith, 1847, Heterolepis capensis Smith, 1847, Mehelia (Simocephalus) fiechteri Scortecci, 1929, Mehelya chanleri chanleri Loveridge, 1936, Mehelya grayi Petzold, 1975, Mehelya lamani Lönnberg, 1910, Mehelya poensis Testi, 1935, Mehelya somaliensis Lönnberg & Andersson, 1913, Simocephalus butleri Boulenger, 1907, Simocephalus capensis Boulenger, 1893, Simocephalus phyllopholis Werner, 1901, Simocephalus unicolor Boulenger, 1910, Heterolepis gueinzii Peters, 1874
    - Gonionotophis capensis capensis (Smith, 1847) Cape file snake, syn. Heterolepis gueinzii Peters, 1874, Heterolepis capensis Smith, 1847
    - Gonionotophis capensis savorgnani (Mosquard, 1887), Cape file snake, syn. Heterolepis capensis Smith, 1847, Heterolepis savorgnani Mocquard, 1887, Mehelya savorgnani, Pauwels, 2006, Mehelya lamani Schmidt, 1923
    - Gonionotophis capensis unicolor (Boulenger, 1910), Cape file snake, syn. Heterolepis chanleri Stejneger, 1893, Simocephalus unicolor Boulenger, 1910
- Genus Hemirhagerrhis:
  - Hemirhagerrhis nototaenia (Günther, 1864), eastern bark snake, syn. Amphiophis nototaenia Boulenger, 1891, Amplorhinus güntheri Mocquard, 1906, Amplorhinus nototaenia Boulenger, 1896, Coronella nototaenia Günther, 1864, Hemirhagerrhis nototaenia nototaenia Bogert, 1940, Psammophylax nototaenia Bocage, 1895, Tachymenis nototaenia Peters, 1882, endemic to sub-Saharan Africa
  - Hemirhagerrhis viperinus Bocage, 1893, western bark snake, syn. Psammophylax viperinus Bocage, 1873, Psammophylax nototaenia Bocage, 1895, Amplorhinus nototaenia Boulenger, 1896, Hemirhagerrhis nototaenia viperinus Bogert, 1940, Hemirhagerrhis nototaenia viperina Mertens, 1955
- Genus Homoroselaps:
  - Homoroselaps dorsalis (A. Smith, 1849), striped harlequin snake, syn. Elaps dorslais [sic] Smith, 1849, Poecilophis dorsalis Günther, 1859, endemic
  - Homoroselaps lacteus (Linnaeus, 1758), spotted harlequin snake, syn. Coluber lacteus Linnaeus, 1758, Elaps lacteus Schneider, 1801, Elaps punctatus Smith, 1826, Elaps hygiae Duméril & Bibron, 1854, Homoroselaps lacteus Welch, 1994, endemic
- Genus Inyoka:
  - Inyoka swazicus (Schaefer, 1970), Swazi rock snake, endemic
- Genus Lamprophis:
  - Lamprophis aurora (Linnaeus, 1758), aurora house snake, night snake, syn. Coluber aurora Linnaeus, 1758, Coronella aurora Schlegel, 1837, Lycodon aurora Boie, 1827, Natrix aurora Merrem, 1820, endemic
  - Lamprophis capensis (Duméril & Bibron, 1854), brown house snake, syn. Lamprophis fuliginosus Boie, 1827, Boaedon capense Duméril & Bibron, 1854
  - Lamprophis fuliginosus Boie, 1827, African house snake, syn. Lycodon fuliginosus Boie, 1827, Boaedon fuliginosum Håkansson, 1981, Boaedon fuliginosus Schmidt, 1923, Boaedon quadrilineatum Peters, 1882, Boodon bipraeocularis Günther, 1888, Boodon fuliginosus Boulenger, 1893, Lamprophis arabicus (Parker, 1988), Lamprophis fuliginosus bedriagae Chippaux, 1999, Boaedon fuliginosus fuliginosus Rasmussen, 1981, Boaedon unicolor Duméril, 1854
    - Lamprophis fuliginosus fuliginosus (Boie, 1827), brown house snake, syn. Boaedon unicolor Duméril (in Duméril, Bibron & Duméril), 1854, Boaedon fuliginosus fuliginosus Rasmussen, 1981
    - Lamprophis fuliginosus mentalis Günther, 1888, brown house snake, syn. Boaedon quadrilineatum Jan (in Jan & Sordelli), 1870, Boodon mentalis Günther, 1888, Lamprophis fuliginosus bedriagae Chippaux, 1999
  - Lamprophis fuscus Boulenger, 1893, yellow-bellied house snake, syn. Lamprophis longicauda Werner, 1909, endemic
  - Lamprophis guttatus Smith, 1843, spotted house snake, syn. Alopecion annulifer Duméril & Bibron, 1854, Boaedon guttatus Loveridge, 1936, Boodon guttatus Boulenger, 1891, Lycodon guttatus Smith, 1843, near endemic
  - Lamprophis inornatus (Duméril, Bibron & Duméril, 1854), olive house snake, syn. Boodon infernalis Günther, 1858, Pachyophis temporalis Werner, 1924, endemic
  - Lamprophis fiskii Boulenger, 1887, Fisk's house snake, syn. Lamprophis fiski Boulenger, 1887, endemic
- Genus Limnophis:
  - Limnophis bangweolicus Broadley, 1991, bicolored swamp snake, syn. Limnophis bicolor Günther, 1865
- Genus Lycodonomorphus:
  - Lycodonomorphus laevissimus (Günther, 1862), dusky-bellied water snake, syn. Natrix laevissima Günther, 1862, Neusterophis laevissima Günther, 1863, Tropidonotus laevissimus Boulenger, 1893, endemic
    - Lycodonomorphus laevissimus fitzsimonsi Raw, 1973, dusky-bellied water snake, endemic
    - Lycodonomorphus laevissimus natalensis Raw, 1973, dusky-bellied water snake, syn. Tropidonotus laevissimus Boulenger, 1893, endemic
    - Lycodonomorphus laevissimus laevissimus Günther, 1862, dusky-bellied water snake, syn. Neusterophis laevissima Günther, 1863, endemic
  - Lycodonomorphus obscuriventris fitzsimonsi, 1964, floodplain water snake, syn. Lycodonomorphus obscuriventris Broadley, 1995, endemic to southern Africa
  - Lycodonomorphus rufulus (Lichtenstein, 1823), common brown water snake, syn. Ablabes rufula Duméril, 1854, Ablabophis rufulus Boulenger, 1893, Coluber rufulus Fitzinger, 1826, Coronella rufula Lichtenstein, 1823, Lamprophis rufulus Smith, 1849, endemic to southern Africa
  - Lycodonomorphus whytii (Boulenger, 1897), Whyte's water snake, syn. Lycodonomorphus obscuriventris Broadley, 1995
- Genus Lycophidion:
  - Lycophidion acutirostre (Günther, 1868), Mozambique wolf snake
  - Lycophidion capense Smith, 1831, Cape wolf snake, syn. Lydodon capensis Smith, 1831, Lycophidion horstockii Bocage, 1866, Lycophidion semicinctum Scortecci, 1931, Lycophidium horstokii Fischer, 1884, Lycophidium capense Boulenger, 1893
    - Lycophidion capense capense (Smith, 1831), Cape wolf snake, syn. Lycophidion capense Boulenger, 1893
    - Lycophidion capense pembanum Laurent, 1968, Cape wolf snake, syn. Lycophidion jacksoni Boulenger, 1893
    - Lycophidion capense jacksoni Boulenger, 1893, Cape wolf snake, syn. Lycophidium capense Boulenger, 1893, Lycophidion irroratum Schmidt, 1923, Lycophidium abyssinicum Boulenger, 1893
    - Lycophidion capense loveridgei Laurent, 1968, Cape wolf snake, syn. Lycophidium abyssinicum Boulenger, 1893, Lycophidion semicinctum Scortecci 1931
    - Lycophidion capense multimaculatum Boettger, 1888, Cape wolf snake, syn. Lycophidion capense jacksoni Boulenger, 1893, Lycophidion multimaculatum Broadley, 1991
    - Lycophidion capense vermiculatum Laurent, 1968, Cape wolf snake, syn. Lycophidion irroratum Schmidt, 1923
  - Lycophidion multimaculatum Broadley, 1992, syn. Lycophidion capense multimaculatum Boettger, 1888, Lycophidion capense mut Boettger, 1888, endemic
  - Lycophidion pygmaeum Broadley, 1996, pygmy wolf snake, syn. Lycophidion pygmaeum, endemic
  - Lycophidion semiannule Peters, 1854 Eastern wolf snake, syn. Lycophidion semiannulis Peters, 1854, Lycophidion acutirostre (Günther, 1868)
  - Lycophidion variegatum Broadley, 1969, variegated wolf snake, syn. Lycophidion variegatum, endemic to southern Africa
- Genus Meizodon:
  - Meizodon semiornatus Peters, 1854, semiornate snake, syn. Coronella semiornata Peters, 1854, Zamenis citernii Boulenger, 1912, Coronella semiornata semiornata Mertens, 1938, Coronella semiornata Loveridge, 1936, Coluber citernii Loveridge, 1957
    - Meizodon semiornatus semiornatus (Peters, 1854), semiornate snake, syn. Zamenis fischeri Peters, 1879, endemic to eastern and southeastern Africa
    - Meizodon semiornatus tchadensis (Chabanaud, 1917), semiornate snake, syn. Coronella inornata Fischer, 1884, Zamenis tchadensis Chabanaud, 1917
- Genus Montaspis:
  - Montaspis gilvomaculata Bourquin, 1991, cream-spotted mountain snake, endemic
- Genus Natriciteres:
  - Natriciteres variegata (Peters, 1861), variable marsh snake, syn. Mizodon variegatus Peters, 1861, Tropidonotus variegatus Boulenger, 1893, Neusterophis variegatus Taylor & Weyer, 1958
    - Natriciteres variegata variegata (Peters, 1861), variable marsh snake, syn. Mizodon variegatus Peters, 1861, Tropidonotus variegatus Boulenger, 1893, Neusterophis variegatus Taylor & Weyer, 1959
  - Natriciteres olivacea (Peters, 1861), olive marsh snake, syn. Coronella olivacea Peters, 1854, Natrix olivacea (Peters, 1854), Natrix olivacea subspecies uluguruensis Loveridge, 1935, Natrix olivaceus (Peters, 1854), Neusterophis atratus Peters, 1877, Tropidonotus olivaceus (Peters, 1854)
  - Natriciteres sylvatica Broadley, 1966, forest marsh snake, syn. Natriciteres variegata sylvatica Broadley, 1966
- Genus Philothamnus:
  - Philothamnus angolensis Bocage, 1882, Angola green snake, syn. Ahaetulla emini Günther, 1888, Ahaetulla shirana Günther, 1888, Chlorophis angolensis Boulenger, 1894, Chlorophis emini Boulenger, 1894, Chlorophis shirana Günther, 1895
  - Philothamnus hoplogaster (Günther, 1863), green water snake, syn. Ahaetulla hoplogaster Günther, 1863, Chlorophis hoplogaster Boulenger, 1894, Chlorophis neglectus Peters, 1867, Chlorophis oldhami Theobald, 1868, Clorophis neglectus Boulenger, 1894, Cyclophis oldhami Theobald, 1876
  - Philothamnus irregularis Leach, 1819, northern green bush snake, syn. Coluber caeruleus Lacépède, 1789, Coluber irregularis Leach, 1819, Dendrophis chenoni Reinhardt, 1843, Leptophis chenonii Duméril et al, 1854, Philothamnus irregularis longifrenatus Buchholz & Peters, 1875, Chlorophis irregularis Boulenger, 1894
  - Philothamnus natalensis Smith, 1848, Natal green snake, syn. Dendrophis (Philothamnus) natalensis Smith, 1848, Dendrophis subcarinatus Jan, 1869, Chlorophis natalensis Boulenger, 1894, Ahaetulla natalensis Günther, 1863, Dendrophis (Philothamnus) albovariata Smith, 1848, Ahaetulla irregularis natalensis Günther, 1858, Philothamnus natalensis natalensis Boycott, 1992, Philothamnus natalensis occidentalis Broadley, 1966
    - Philothamnus natalensis natalensis (A. Smith, 1840), Eastern Natal green snake, syn. Dendrophis (Philothamnus) albovariata Smith, 1848
    - Philothamnus natalensis occidentalis Broadley, 1966, Western Natal green snake, syn. Ahaetulla irregularis natalensis Günther, 1858, endemic
  - Philothamnus semivariegatus (A. Smith, 1847), spotted bush snake, syn. Dendrophis (Philothamnus) semivariegata Smith, 1840, Ahaetulla bocagii Günther, 1888, Ahaetulla irregularis Parenti & Picaglia, 1886, Chrysopelea capensis Smith, 1837, Philothamnus bocagii Günther, 1895, Philothamnus semivariegatus semivariegatus Loveridge, 1936, Philothamnus semivariegatus semivariegatus Loveridge, 1936' endemic to sub-Saharan Africa
- Genus Prosymna:
  - Prosymna bivittata Werner, 1903, two-striped shovel-snout, syn. Prosymna sundevalli bivittata Werner, 1903, endemic
  - Prosymna frontalis Peters, 1867, south-western shovel-snout, syn. Temnorhynchus frontalis Peters, 1867, Prosymna bergeri Lindholm (in Lampe & Lindholm), 1902, endemic to southern Africa
  - Prosymna janii Bianconi, 1862, Mozambique shovel-snout, syn. Prosymna jani Loveridge, 1862
  - Prosymna lineata (Peter, 1871), lineolate shovel-snout, syn. Prosymna sundevalli lineata, endemic
  - Prosymna sundevallii (A. Smith, 1849), lineolate shovel-snout, syn. Temnorhynchus sundervalli Smith, 1849, Prosymna lineata (Boycott, 1992), Prosymna sundevalli lineata (Peters 1871), Temnorhynchus lineatus Peters 1871, Prosymna sundevalli sundevalli (Smith, 1849), Temnorhynchus sundervalli Smith, 1849, near endemic
    - Prosymna sundevallii lineata (Peters, 1871), lineolate shovel-snout, syn. Prosymna lineata Boycott 1992, Temnorhynchus lineatus Peters 1871
    - Prosymna sundevallii sundevalli (Smith, 1849), southern shovel-snout, syn. Temnorhynchus lineatus
  - Prosymna stuhlmannii (Pfeffer, 1893), Eastern African shovel-snout
- Genus Psammophis:
  - Psammophis angolensis (Bocage, 1872), dwarf sand snake, syn. Ablabes homeyeri Peters, 1870, Amphiophis angolensis Bocage, 1872, Amphiophis angolense Günther, 1888
  - Psammophis crucifer (Daudin, 1803), cross-marked grass snake, syn. Coluber crucifer Daudin, 1803, near endemic
  - Psammophis jallae Peracca, 1896, Jalla's sand snake
  - Psammophis leightoni Boulenger, 1902, Cape sand snake, endemic
  - Psammophis subtaeniatus Peters, 1881, stripe-bellied sand snake, syn. Psammophis bocagii Boulenger, 1895, Psammophis moniliger bilineatus Peters, 1867, Psammophis subtaeniatus subtaeniatus Auerbach, 1987, Psammophis sibilans subtaeniata Peters, 1882
  - Psammophis trigrammus Günther, 1865, western sand snake, endemic to southwestern Africa
  - Psammophis trinasalis Werner, 1902, fork-marked sand snake, syn. Psammophis furcatus Loveridge, 1936, Psammophis leightoni trinasalis Werner, 1902, Psammophis moniliger furcatus Peters, 1867, Psammophis sibilans trinasalis Werner, 1902, endemic to southern Africa
  - Psammophis brevirostris Peters, 1881, short-snouted grass snake, syn. Coluber sibilans Linnaeus, 1758, Coluber moniliger Daudin 1803, Psammophis sibilans Boie, 1827, Psammophis sibilans Boie, 1827 , endemic to southern Africa
  - Psammophis mossambicus Peters, 1882, olive grass snake, syn. Psammophis sibilans mossambica Peters 1882, Psammophis sibilans tettensis Peters, 1882, Psammophis thomasi Gough 1908
  - Psammophis namibensis Broadley, 1975, Namib sand snake, syn. Psammophis leightoni namibensis Broadley 1975, Psammophis leightoni namibensis Bauer et al. 1993, Psammophis namibensis Broadley 2002, Psammophis namibensis Bauer & Branch 2003, Psammophis namibensis Shine et al. 2006
  - Psammophis notostictus Peters, 1867, Karoo sand snake, syn. Psammophis moniliger notostictus Peters, 1867
- Genus Psammophylax:
  - Psammophylax rhombeatus Linnaeus, 1758. spotted skaapsteker, syn. Coluber rhombeatus Linnaeus, 1758, Psammophylax tritaeniatus tritaeniatus, Dipsas rhombeatus Duméril & Bibron, 1854, Psammophis longementalis Roux, 1907, Psammophylax rhombeatus rhombeatus Boycott, 1992
    - Psammophylax rhombeatus rhombeatus (Bocage, 1873), striped skaapsteker, syn. Psammophylax rhombeatus Fischer, 1881
  - Psammophylax tritaeniatus (Günther, 1868), striped skaapsteker, syn. Rhagerrhis tritaeniatus Günther, 1868, endemic to sub-Saharan Africa
    - Psammophylax tritaeniatus fitgeraldi, striped skaapsteker, syn. Psammophylax tritaeniatus Günther, 1868
    - Psammophylax tritaeniatus subniger (Laurent, 1956), striped skaapsteker, syn. Psammophylax tritaeniatus tritaeniatus (Günther, 1868)
    - Psammophylax tritaeniatus tritaeniatus (Günther, 1868), striped skaapsteker, syn. Rhagerhis tritaeniata Bocage, 1896
    - Psammophylax tritaeniatus festigus (Laurent, 1956), striped skaapsteker, syn. Psammophylax tritaeniatus Günther, 1868
    - Psammophylax tritaeniatus vanoyei (Laurent, 1956), striped skaapsteker, syn. Psammophylax tritaeniatus Günther, 1868
- Genus Pseudaspis:
  - Pseudaspis cana (Linnaeus, 1758), mole snake, syn. Coluber canus Linnaeus, 1758, Coronella cana Duméril, Bibron & Duméril, 1854, Duberria cana Fitzinger, 1826, Pseudaspis cana Cope, 1864, Cadnus cuneiformis Theobald (fide Fitzsimmons, 1966), Coronella phocarum Günther (fide Fitzsimmons, 1966), Ophirhina anchietae Bocage (fide Fitzsimmons, 1966)
- Genus Rhamphiophis:
  - Rhamphiophis rostratus Peters, 1854, rufous beaked snake, syn. Rhamphiophis oxyrhynchus rostratus (Peters, 1854), Rhamphiophis oxyrhynchus (Reinhart, 1843), Rhamphiophis oxyrhynchus Peters, 1854, Rhagerrhis unguiculata Günther, 1868, Coelopeltis oxyrhynchus Jan, Coelopeltis porrectus Jan, Rhagerrhis oxyrhynchus Günther, 1888, endemic to sub-Saharan Africa
- Genus Telescopus:
  - Telescopus beetzii (Barbour, 1922), Namib tiger snake, syn. Tarbophis beetzi Barbour, 1922. endemic to southwestern Africa
  - Telescopus semiannulatus Smith, 1849 common tiger snake, syn. Leptodira semiannulata Günther, 1888, Tarbophis semiannulatus Sternfeld, 1910, Telescopus semiannulatus semiannulatus Boycott, 1992
    - Telescopus semiannulatus polystictus Mertens, 1954, Damara tiger snake, syn. Telescopus semiannulatus Duméril & Bibron, 1854 endemic to southwestern Africa
    - Telescopus semiannulatus semiannulatus A. Smith, 1849, eastern tiger snake, syn. Leptodira semiannulata Günther, 1888, endemic to southern half of Africa
- Genus Thelotornis:
  - Thelotornis capensis Smith, 1849, vine snake, syn. Thelotornis capensis capensis Smith, 1849, Dryiophis kirtlandii mossambicana Bocage, 1895, Dryiophis oatesi Günther, 1881, Thelotornis capensis oatesi (Günther, 1881), Thelotornis mossambicanus Broadley, 2001, Thelotornis kirtlandi capensis Smith, 1849, Thelotornis kirtlandii oatesi Broadley, 1962, Thelotornis oatesi Haagner et al. 2000, Thelotornis capensis mossambicanus (Bocage, 1895), Thelotornis capensis mossambicanus Rasmussen, 1981
    - Thelotornis capensis capensis A. Smith, 1849, twig snake, syn. Thelotornis capensis Smith, 1849, endemic to southern Africa
    - Thelotornis capensis mossambicanus (Bocage, 1895), eastern vine snake, syn. Thelotornis kirtlandi capensis Smith, 1849, Dryiophis kirtlandii var. mossambicana Bocage, 1895, Thelotornis mossambicanus Broadley, 2001
    - Thelotornis capensis oatesi (Günther, 1881), Oates' vine snake, syn. Thelotornis kirtlandi capensis Loveridge, 1957, Dryiophis oatesi Günther, 1881, Thelotornis capensis oatesi (Günther, 1881)
    - Thelotornis capensis schilsi Derleyn, 1978, twig snake, syn. Thelotornis capensis capensis Boycott, 1992

=== Cordylidae ===
Family Cordylidae

- Genus Chamaesaura:
  - Chamaesaura aenae (Fitzsimons, 1843), Transvaal snake lizard, syn. Cricochalcis aenea Fitzinger, 1843, Chamaesaura miodactyla Günther, 1880, Cordylus aenea Frost et al., 2001, endemic
  - Chamaesaura anguina Linnaeus, 1758, Cape snake lizard, syn. Chamaesaura anguina anguina (Linnaeus 1758), Chalcides monodactylus Oppel, 1811, Chamaesaura anguinea Schneider, 1801, Chamaesaura annectens Boulenger, 1899, Chamaesaura didactyla Boulenger, 1890, Chamaesaura tenuior Günther, 1895, Cordylus anguina Cooper, 2005, Cordylus anguinus Frost et al., 2001, Monodactylus anguinus Merrem, 1820, Seps monodactylus Daudin, 1802, Lacerta anguina Linnaeus, 1758, Chalcides pinnata Laurenti, 1768, Chalcides anguina Meyer, 1795, Chamaesaura anguina oligopholis Laurent, 1964, Chamaesaura annectens Boulenger, 1899, Chamaesaura anguina tenuior Loveridge, 1944
    - Chamaesaura anguina anguina (Linnaeus, 1758), Cape grass lizard, syn. Lacerta anguina Linnaeus, 1758, endemic
    - Chamaesaura anguina oligopholis Laurent, 1964, Cape snake lizard, syn. Chalcides pinnata Laurenti, 1768
    - Chamaesaura anguina tenuior Günther, 1895, Cape snake lizard, syn. Chalcides anguina Meyer, 1795, Chamaesaura annectens Boulenger 1899, Chamaesaura tenuior Günther 1895
  - Chamaesaura macrolepis (Cope, 1862), large-scale snake lizard, syn. Chamaesaura macrolepis macrolepis (Cope, 1862), Cordylus macrolepis Frost et al., 2001, Mancus macrolepis Cope, 1862, Chamaesaura macrolepis miopropus Boulenger, 1894, Chamaesaura miopropus Boulenger, 1894, near endemic
    - Chamaesaura macrolepis macrolepis (Cope, 1862), large-scale snake lizard, syn. Mancus macrolepis Cope, 1862, Cordylus macrolepis Frost et al., 2001
    - Chamaesaura macrolepis miopropus Boulenger, 1894, large-scale snake lizard, syn. Chamaesaura macrolepis Boulenger, 1885, Chamaesaura miopropus Boulenger, 1894
- Genus Cordylus:
  - Cordylus campbelli Fitzsimons, 1938, Campbell's girdled lizard, syn. Zonurus campbelli Fitzsimons, 1938
  - Cordylus cloetei Mouton & Van Wyk, 1994, Cloete's girdled lizard, endemic
  - Cordylus cordylus (Linnaeus, 1758), Cape girdled lizard, syn. Lacerta cordylus Linnaeus, 1758, Cordylus verus Laurenti, 1768, Stellio cordylus Daudin, 1802, Cordylus dorsalis Cuvier, 1829, Cordylus griseus Cuvier, 1829, Zonurus vertebralis Gray, 1838, Zonurus cordylus Gray, 1838, endemic
  - Cordylus imkae Mouton & Van Wyk, 1994, Rooiberg girdled lizard, syn. Cordylus imkeae, endemic
  - Cordylus jonesii (Boulenger, 1891) Jones' girdled lizard, syn. Zonurus jonesii Boulenger, 1891, Zonurus cordylus jonesii Power, 1930, Cordylus cordylus jonesii Loveridge, 1944, Cordylus tropidosternum jonesii Auerbach, 1987, endemic
  - Cordylus macropholis (Boulenger, 1910), coastal spinytail lizard, syn. Zonurus macropholis Boulenger, 1910, endemic
  - Cordylus mclachlani (Mouton, 1986), McLachlan's girdled lizard, endemic
  - Cordylus minor Fitzsimons, 1943, western dwarf girdled lizard, syn. Cordylus cordylus minor Fitzsimons, 1943, endemic
  - Cordylus namaquensis Methuen & Hewitt, 1914, Namaqua girdled lizard, syn. Zonurus namaquensis Methuen & Hewitt, 1914
  - Cordylus niger Cuvier, 1829, black girdled lizard, syn. Calyptoprymnus verecundus De Vis, 1905, Zonurus cordylus niger Rose, 1926, Zonurus cordylus atrus Power, 1930, Cordylus cordylus niger Loveridge, 1944, endemic
  - Cordylus oelofseni Mouton & Van Wyk, 1990, Oelofsen's girdled lizard, endemic
  - Cordylus tasmani Power, 1930 Tasman's girdled lizard, syn. Zonurus cordylus tasmani Power, 1930, Cordylus cordylus tasmani Fitzsimons, 1943, endemic
  - Cordylus vittifer (Reichenow, 1887), Transvaal girdled lizard, syn. Cordylus vittifer vittifer (Reichenow, 1887), Zonurus tropidogaster Boulenger, 1910, Zonurus vittifer Reichenow, 1887, Cordylus vittifer machadoi Laurent, 1964 Near, endemic
    - Cordylus vittifer machadoi Laurent, 1964, Machado’s girdled lizard, syn. Zonurus cordylus var. vittifer Roux, 1907, Cordylus machadoi Branch, 1998
    - Cordylus vittifer vittifer (Reichenow, 1887), Transvaal girdled lizard, syn. Zonurus vittifer Reichenow, 1887
  - Cordylus warreni Boulenger, 1908 Warren's spinytail lizard, syn. Cordylus barbertonensis, Cordylus breyeri Branch, 1998, Cordylus depressus, Cordylus laevigatus Fitzsimons, 1943, Cordylus mossambicus Branch, 1998, Cordylus regius Branch, 1998, Cordylus vandami Branch, 1998, Cordylus vandami vandami Fitzsimons, 1943, Cordylus warreni barbertonensis (Van Dam, 1921), Cordylus warreni breyeri (Van Dam, 1921), Cordylus warreni depressus (Fitzsimons, 1930), Cordylus warreni laevigatus (Fitzsimons, 1933), Cordylus warreni mossambicus Fitzsimons, 1958, Cordylus warreni perkoensis (Fitzsimons, 1930), Cordylus warreni regius Broadley, 1962, Cordylus warreni vandami (Fitzsimons, 1930), Cordylus warreni warreni (Boulenger, 1908), Zonurus barbertonensis depressus Fitzsimons, 1930, Zonurus barbertonensis Van Dam, 1921, Zonurus breyeri Van Dam, 1921, Zonurus laevigatus Fitzsimons, 1933, Zonurus vandami Fitzsimons, 1930, Zonurus vandami perkoensis Fitzsimons, 1930, Zonurus warreni Boulenger, 1908
    - Cordylus warreni laevigatus (Fitzsimons, 1933), Warren's girdled lizard, syn. Zonurus barbertonensis Van Dam, 1921, Cordylus laevigatus Fitzsimons, 1943, Zonurus laevigatus Fitzsimons, 1933
    - Cordylus warreni mossambicus Fitzsimons, 1958, Gorongosa girdled lizard, syn. Cordylus warreni barbertonensis Fitzsimons, 1943, Cordylus mossambicus Branch, 1998
    - Cordylus warreni perkoensis (Fitzsimons, 1930), Warren's girdled lizard, syn. Cordylus warreni barbertonensis Boycott, 1992, Zonurus vandami perkoensis Fitzsimons, 1930
    - Cordylus warreni regius Broadley, 1962, regal girdled lizard, syn. Cordylus barbertonensis, Cordylus regius Branch, 1998
  - Cordylus warreni vandami (Fitzsimons, 1930), Van Dam’s girdled lizard, syn. Cordylus warreni breyeni (Van Dam, 1921), Cordylus vandami Branch, 1998, Cordylus vandami vandami Fitzsimons, 1943, Zonurus vandami Fitzsimons, 1930
- Genus Hemicordylus:
  - Hemicordylus capensis (A. Smith, 1838), graceful crag lizard, syn. Cordylus capensis Smith, 1838, Cordylus (Hemicordylus) capensis Smith, 1838, Zonurus capensis Duméril & Bibron, 1839, Zonurus capensis Boulenger, 1885, Zonurus robertsi Van Dam, 1921, Cordylus capensis capensis Fitzsimons, 1943, Cordylus capensis robertsi Fitzsimons, 1943, Pseudocordylus robertsi Loveridge, 1944, endemic
  - Hemicordylus nebulosus (Mouton & Van Wyk, 1995), dwarf crag lizard, dwarf cliff lizard, endemic
- Genus Karusasaurus:
  - Karusasaurus polyzonus (A. Smith, 1838), southern Karusa lizard, Karoo girdled lizard, syn. Zonurus polyzonus Duméril & Bibron, 1839, near endemic
- Genus Namazonurus:
  - Namazonurus lawrenci (Fitzsimons, 1939), Lawrence's Nama lizard, Lawrence's girdled lizard, syn. Zonurus lawrenci Fitzsimons, 1939, Cordylus cordylus lawrenci Loveridge, 1944, endemic
  - Namazonurus peersi Hewitt, 1932, Peers' Nama lizard, Peers' girdled lizard, Hewitt's spinytail lizard, syn. Zonurus peersi Fitzsimons, 1930, endemic
- Genus Ninurta:
  - Ninurta coeruleopunctatus (Hewitt & Methuen, 1913), blue-spotted girdled lizard, syn. Zonurus coeruleopunctatus Hewitt & Methuen, 1913, Cordylus coeruleo-punctatus Fitzsimons, 1943, endemic
- Genus Oroborus:
  - Ouroborus cataphractus (Boie, 1828), armadillo girdled lizard, syn. Zonurus cataphractus Gray, 1831, Cordylus nebulosus Smith, 1838, endemic
- Genus Platysaurus:
  - Platysaurus capensis A. Smith, 1844, Cape flat lizard, endemic to southern Africa
  - Platysaurus intermedius Matschie, 1891, common flat lizard, syn. Platysaurus guttatus intermedius Wermuth, 1968, Platysaurus guttatus natalensis Fitzsimons, 1948, Platysaurus guttatus nyasae Loveridge, 1953, Platysaurus guttatus rhodesianus Fitzsimons, 1941, Platysaurus guttatus subniger Broadley, 1962, Platysaurus guttatus wilhelmi Loveridge, 1944, Platysaurus intermedius inopinus Jacobsen, 1994, Platysaurus intermedius intermedius Matschie, 1891, Platysaurus intermedius natalensis Fitzsimons, 1948, Platysaurus intermedius nigrescens Broadley, 1981, Platysaurus intermedius nyasae Loveridge, 1953, Platysaurus intermedius parvus Broadley, 1976, Platysaurus intermedius rhodesianus Fitzsimons, 1941, Platysaurus intermedius subniger Broadley, 1962, Platysaurus intermedius wilhelmi Hewitt, 1909, Platysaurus wilhelmi Hewitt, 1909, Platysaurus wilhelmi wilhelmi Pienaar, 1966
    - Platysaurus intermedius inopinus Jacobsen, 1994, Blouberg flat lizard, syn. Platysaurus intermedius intermedius, syn. Broadley, 1978, endemic
    - Platysaurus intermedius intermedius Matschie, 1891, common flat lizard, syn. Platysaurus guttatus intermedius Wermuth, 1968, endemic
    - Platysaurus intermedius natalensis Fitzsimons, 1948, Natal flat lizard, syn. Platysaurus intermedius Adolphs, 2006, Platysaurus guttatus natalensis Fitzsimons 1948, endemic
    - Platysaurus intermedius nyasae Loveridge, 1953, common flat lizard, syn. Platysaurus intermedius inopinus Jacobsen, 1994, Platysaurus guttatus nyasae Loveridge, 1953
    - Platysaurus intermedius parvus Broadley, 1976, lesser flat lizard, syn. Platysaurus intermedius natalensis Fitzsimons, 1948, endemic
    - Platysaurus intermedius rhodesianus Fitzsimons, 1941, Zimbabwe flat lizard, syn. Platysaurus guttatus natalensis Fitzsimons, 1948, Platysaurus guttatus rhodesianus Fitzsimons, 1941, endemic to southern Africa
    - Platysaurus intermedius subniger Broadley, 1962, common flat lizard, syn. Platysaurus intermedius natalensis Broadley, 1978, Platysaurus guttatus subniger Broadley, 1962
    - Platysaurus intermedius wilhelmi Hewitt, 1909, Wilhelm's flat lizard, syn. Platysaurus intermedius natalensis Boycott, 1992, Platysaurus guttatus wilhelmi Loveridge, 1944, Platysaurus wilhelmi wilhelmi Pienaar, 1966, endemic
  - Platysaurus broadleyi Branch & Whiting, 1997, Augrabies flat lizard, endemic
  - Platysaurus guttatus A. Smith, 1849, lesser flat lizard, syn. Platysaurus guttatus guttatus Auerbach, 1987, Platysaurus guttatus fitzsimonsi Loveridge, 1944, endemic
  - Platysaurus lebomboensis Jacobsen, 1994, Lebombo flat lizard, near endemic
  - Platysaurus minor Fitzsimons, 1930, Waterberg flat lizard, syn. Platysaurus guttatus minor Fitzsimons, 1930, endemic
  - Platysaurus monotropis Jacobsen, 1994, orange-throated flat lizard, endemic
  - Platysaurus orientalis Fitzsimons, 1941, Sekhukhune flat lizard, syn. Platysaurus orientalis orientalis Fitzsimons, 1941, Platysaurus guttatus orientalis Loveridge, 1944, Platysaurus minor orientalis Fitzsimons, 1941, Platysaurus orientalis fitzsimonsi Loveridge, 1944, Platysaurus guttatus fitzsimonsi Loveridge, 1944, Platysaurus fitzsimonsi Broadley, 1978, endemic
    - Platysaurus orientalis fitzsimonsi Loveridge, 1944, FitzSimons' flat lizard, syn. Platysaurus guttatus orientalis, Platysaurus fitzsimonsi Broadley 1978, Platysaurus guttatus fitzsimonsi Loveridge 1944, endemic
    - Platysaurus orientalis orientalis Fitzsimons, 1941, Sekhukhune flat lizard, syn. Platysaurus minor orientalis, endemic
  - Platysaurus relictus Broadley, 1976, Transvaal flat lizard, endemic
- Genus Pseudocordylus:
  - Pseudocordylus langi Loveridge, 1944 Lang’s crag lizard, syn. Cordylus langi (Loveridge, 1944), endemic
  - Pseudocordylus melanotus melanotus (A. Smith, 1838), common crag lizard, endemic
    - Pseudocordylus melanotus subviridis (A. Smith, 1838), Drakensberg crag lizard, syn. Cordylus subviridis Smith, 1838, Pseudocordylus subviridis Hewitt, 1927, Cordylus subviridis, Pseudocordylus microlepidotus subviridis Fitzsimons, 1937, Pseudocordylus subviridis subviridis Fitzsimons 1943, endemic
  - Pseudocordylus microlepidotus fasciatus A. Smith, 1838, Karoo crag lizard, Cordylus fasciatus, Cites, 2002, Cordylus algoensis Smith, 1838, Cordylus fasciatus Smith, 1838, Pseudocordylus fasciatus Hewitt 1927, endemic
    - Pseudocordylus microlepidotus microlepidotus (Cuvier, 1829), Cape crag lizard, syn. Cordylus montanus Smith, 1838; Cordylus microlepidotus Cuvier, 1829, Zonurus microlepidotus Gray, 1831, Zonurus wittii Schlegel, 1834, endemic
    - Pseudocordylus microlepidotus namaquensis Hewitt, 1927, Nuweveldberg crag lizard, syn. Cordylus microlepidotus namaquensis, Pseudocordylus microlepidotus namaquensis (Hewitt 1927), endemic
  - Pseudocordylus spinosus Fitzsimon, 1947, spiny crag lizard, syn. Cordylus spinosus, endemic
  - Pseudocordylus transvaalensis Fitzsimon, 1943, northern crag lizard, syn. Pseudocordylus subviridis transvaalensis Fitzsimons, 1943, Cordylus transvaalensis (Fitzsimons, 1943), endemic
- Genus Smaug:
  - Smaug breyeri (Van Dam, 1921), Waterberg girdled lizard, syn. Cordylus warreni warreni Boycott, 1992, Cordylus breyeri Branch, 1998, Zonurus breyeni Van Dam, 1921, endemic
  - Smaug giganteus Smith, 1844, giant girdled lizard, syn. Zonurus derbianus Gray, 1845, Zonurus giganteus Boulenger, 1885, endemic
  - Smaug vandami (Fitzsimmons, 1930), Van Dam’s girdled lizard, syn. Cordylus vandami Branch, 1998, endemic
  - Smaug warreni warreni (Boulenger, 1908), Warren's girdled lizard, syn. Zonurus warreni Boulenger, 1908, near endemic
  - Smaug warreni barbertonensis (Van Dam, 1921), Barberton girdled lizard, syn. Cordylus warreni warreni Fitzsimons, 1943, Cordylus barbertonensis, Zonurus barbertonensis Van 1921, endemic
  - Smaug warreni depressus (Fitzsimons, 1930), Zoutpansberg girdled lizard, Cordylus warreni barbertonensis (Van Dam, 1921), Cordylus depressus, Zonurus barbertonensis depressus Fitzsimons, 1930

=== Elapidae ===
Family Elapidae

- Genus Aspidelaps:
  - Aspidelaps lubricus Laurenti, 1768, Cape coral snake, syn. Natrix lubrica Laurenti, 1768, Naia somersetta Smith, 1826, Elaps lubricus Duméril & Bibron, 1854, Aspidelaps lubricus cowlesi Bogert, 1940, Aspidelaps lubricus infuscatus Mertens, 1954, Aspidelaps lubricus cowlesi Welch, 1994, Aspidelaps lubricus lubricus (Laurenti, 1768)
    - Aspidelaps lubricus cowlesi Bogert, 1940, Angolan coral snake, syn. Naia somersetta Smith, 1826, Aspidelaps lubricus infuscatus Mertens, 1954
    - Aspidelaps lubricus lubricus (Laurenti, 1768), coral shield cobra, syn. Elaps lubricus Duméril & Bibron, 1854, Natrix lubrica Laurenti, 1768
  - Aspidelaps scutatus Smith, 1849, shield-nose snake, syn. Naia fula-fula Bianconi, 1849, Aspidelaps scutatus scutatus (Smith, 1849), Cyrtophis scutatus Smith, 1849, Aspidelaps scutatus bachrani Mertens, 1954, Aspidelaps scutatus fulafulus (Bianconi, 1849), Aspidelaps scutatus intermedius Broadley, 1968
    - Aspidelaps scutatus bachrani Mertens, 1954, shield-nose snake, syn. Cyrtophis scutatus Smith, 1849
    - Aspidelaps scutatus fulafulus (Bianconi, 1849), eastern shield-nose snake, syn. Crytophis [sic] scutatus Smith, 1849, Aspidelaps scutatus Boulenger 1896, Naia fulafula Bianconi 1849
    - Aspidelaps scutatus intermedius Broadley, 1968, intermediate shield-nose snake, syn. Cyrtophis scutatus Smith, 1849, endemic
    - Aspidelaps scutatus scutatus (A. Smith, 1849), speckled shield cobra, syn. Aspidelaps scutatus Smith 1849, endemic to southern Africa
- Genus Dendroaspis:
  - Dendroaspis angusticeps (A. Smith, 1849), green mamba, syn. Dendroaspis sjöstedti Lönnberg, 1910, Naja angusticeps Smith, 1849, Dendraphis angusticeps Günther, 1858
  - Dendroaspis polylepis Günther, 1864, black mamba, syn. Dendroaspis polylepis polylepis Günther, 1864, Dendraspis antinorii Peters, 1873, Dendraspis angusticeps Boulenger, 1896, Dendroaspis polylepis antinorii (Peters, 1873), Dendraspis antinorii Peters 1873
    - Dendroaspis polylepis antinori (Peters, 1876), black mamba, syn. Dendraspis angusticeps Boulenger, 1896
    - Dendroaspis polylepis polylepis (Günther, 1864), black mamba, syn. Dendraspis polylepis Günther, 1864
- Genus Elapsoidea:
  - Elapsoidea boulengeri Boettger, 1895, Boulenger's garter snake, syn. Elapechis boulengeri Boulenger, 1896, Elapechis guentheri Peracca, 1896, Elapechis sundevallii Peracca, 1896, Elapsoidea sundevallii decosteri Loveridge, 1944, Elapsoidea semiannulata boulengeri Broadley, 1971, restricted to southeastern Africa
  - Elapsoidea semiannulata Bocage, 1882, Angolan garter snake, syn. Elapechis guentheri Boulenger, 1896, Elapsoidea decosteri huilensis Laurent, 1964, Elapsoidea sundevalli guentheri Loveridge, 1944, Elapsoidea güntherii Bocage, 1873, Elapsoidea sundevalli semiannulata Loveridge, 1944, Elapsoidea semiannulata semiannulata Broadley, 1971, Elapsoidea semiannulata moebiusi Werner, 1897, Elapsoidea decosteri moebiusi Laurent, 1956
    - Elapsoidea semiannulata moebiusi (Werner, 1897), Angolan garter snake, syn. Elapsoidea güntherii, Elapsoidea decosteri moebiusi Laurent, 1956, Elapsoidea moebiusi Werner, 1897, Elapsoidea sundevalli moebiusi Parker, 1949
    - Elapsoidea semiannulata semiannulata Bocage, 1882, Angolan garter snake, syn. Elapsoidea güntherii, Elapsoidea sundevalli semiannulata Loveridge, 1944
  - Elapsoidea sundevallii (A. Smith, 1848), Sundevall's garter snake, syn. Elapsoidea sundevallii sundevallii (Smith, 1848), Elapechis sundevallii Boulenger, 1896, Elapsoidea sundevallii decosteri Boulenger, 1888, Elapsoidea decosteri Boulenger, 1888, Elapechis decosteri Sternfeld, 1910, Elapsoidea sundevalli fitzsimonsi Loveridge, 1944, Elapsoidea sundevallii longicauda Broadley, 1971, Elapsoidea sundevallii media Broadley, 1971, Elapechis guentheri Gough, 1908, endemic to southern Africa
    - Elapsoidea sundevallii fitzsimonsi Loveridge, 1944, Kalahari garter snake, syn. Elapsoidea sundevallii Peters, 1880
    - Elapsoidea sundevallii longicauda Broadley, 1971, Sundevall's garter snake, syn. Elapsoidea sundevalli fitzsimonsi Fitzsimons 1962
    - Elapsoidea sundevallii media Broadley, 1971, Highveld garter snake, syn. Elapechis guentheri Gough 1908, Elapechis sundevallii Gough 1908
- Genus Hemachatus:
  - Hemachatus haemachatus Lacépède, 1789, rinkhals, syn. Aspidelaps haemachates Jan, 1859, Coluber haemachates Bonnaterre, 1790, Naia capensis Smith, 1826, Naja haemachates Schlegel, 1837, Sepedon haemachates Merrem, 1820, Vipera haemachates Latreille, 1801, Vipere haemachate Lacépède, 1789, Sipedon haemachates Lockington, 1886, near endemic
- Genus Naja:
  - Naja nigricollis Reinhardt, 1843, black-necked spitting cobra, syn. Naja nigricollis crawshayi Günther, 1893, Naja nigricollis atriceps Laurent, 1955, Naja nigricollis occidentalis Laurent, 1973, Naja nigricollis nigricollis Broadley & Howell, 1991, Naja crawshayi Broadley & Cotterill, 2004, Naja (Afronaja) nigricollis Wallach, et al. 2009, Naja nigricillis occidentalis Bocage 1895
  - Naja anchietae Bocage, 1879, Anchieta's cobra, syn. Naja annulifera anchietae Broadley, 1995, Naja haje Boettger, 1887, Naja haje anchietae Mertens, 1937, Naia anchietae Boulenger, 1896, Naja (Uraeus) anchietae Wallach et al. 2009
  - Naja annulifera Peters, 1854, snouted cobra, syn. Naja haje annulifera Peters, 1854, Naja haie Boulenger, 1896, Naja nigricollis Curtis, 1911, Naja haje haje Bogert, 1943, Naja haje annulifera Auerbach, 1987, Naja (Uraeus) annulifera Wallach et al. 2009
  - Naja melanoleuca Hallowell, 1857, forest cobra, syn. Aspidelaps bocagii Sauvage, 1884, Naja annulata Buchholz & Peters, 1876, Naja haje leucosticta Fischer, 1885, Naja haje melanoleuca Hallowell, 1857, Naja leucostica Bethencourt-Ferreira, 1930, Naja melanoleuca Matschie, 1893, Naja melanoleuca aurata Stucki-Stirn, 1979, Naja melanoleuca melanoleuca Capocaccia, 1961, Naja melanoleuca subfulva Laurent, 1955, Naja subfulva Chirio et al., 2006, Naja (Boulengerina) melanoleuca Wallach et al., 2009
  - Naja mossambica Peters, 1854, Mozambique spitting cobra, syn. Naja nigricollis nigricollis (Boycott, 1992), Naja mossambica mossambica Fischer, 1884, Naja nigricollis mossambica Fischer, 1884, Naja (Afronaja) mossambica Wallach et al., 2009
  - Naja nigricincta woodi Pringle, 1955, black spitting cobra, endemic to southern Africa
  - Naja nivea (Linnaeus, 1758), Cape cobra, syn. Coluber niveus Linnaeus, 1758, Vipera (Echidna) flava Merrem, 1820, Naja gutturalis Smith, 1838, Naja intermixta Duméril & Duméril, 1854, Naja haje capensis Jan, 1863, Naja flava Boulenger, 1887, Naja (Uraeus) nivea Wallach et al., 2009, endemic to southern Africa

=== Gekkonidae ===
Family Gekkonidae

- Genus Afroedura:
  - Afroedura africana Boulenger, 1888 African flat gecko, syn. Oedura africana Boulenger, 1888, endemic
    - Afroedura africana africana (Boulenger, 1888), African rock gecko
    - Afroedura africana namaquensis (Fitzsimons, 1938), African rock gecko, syn. Afroedura namaquensis Loveridge, 1947, Oedura namaquensis Fitzsimmons, 1938, endemic
    - Afroedura africana tirasensis Haacke, 1965, African rock gecko
  - Afroedura amatolica (Hewitt, 1925), Amatola rock gecko, syn. Oedura amatolica Hewitt, 1925, Afroedura amatolica Welch, 1994, Afroedura nivaria Loveridge 1947, endemic
  - Afroedura hawequensis Mouton & Mostet, 1985, Cape rock gecko, syn. Afroedura hawequensis Rösler 1995, endemic
  - Afroedura karroica (Hewitt, 1925), inland rock gecko, syn. Oedura karroica Hewitt, 1925, endemic
    - Afroedura karroica halli (Hewitt, 1935), inland rock gecko, syn. Afroedura karroica Hewitt 1925, Oedura halli Hewitt, 1935, Afroedura halli Branch, 1998, endemic
    - Afroedura karroica karroica (Hewitt, 1926), inland rock gecko, syn. Afroedura karroica Hewitt 1925, Oedura karroica wilmoti Hewitt, 1926
  - Afroedura nivaria (Boulenger, 1894), Drakensberg rock gecko, syn. Oedura nivaria Boulenger, 1894, Afroedura nivara Barts, 2004, endemic
  - Afroedura pondolia (Hewitt, 1925), Pondo rock gecko, syn. Oedura pondolia Hewitt, 1925, Oedura pondoensis Power, 1935 endemic
    - Afroedura pondolia haackei Onderstall, 1984, Pondo rock gecko, syn. Afroedura pondolia Branch, 1998, Afroedura multiporis haackei Jacobson, 1992
    - Afroedura pondolia langi (Fitzsimons, 1930), Pondo rock gecko, syn. Afroedura pondolia pondolia (Hewitt, 1925), Afroedura langi Jacobson, 1922, Oedura langi Fitzsimons, 1930, near endemic
    - Afroedura pondolia major Onderstall, 1984, Pondo rock gecko, syn. Oedura langi Fitzsimons, 1930, Afroedura major Branch, 1988, endemic
    - Afroedura pondolia marleyi (Fitzsimons, 1930), Pondo rock gecko, syn. Afroedura pondolia pondolia (Hewitt, 1925), Afroedura major, Oedura marleyi Fitzsimons, 1930, Afroedura marleyi Branch, 1998, endemic
    - Afroedura pondolia multiporis (Hewitt, 1925), Pondo rock gecko, syn. Afroedura pondolia haackei Onderstall, 1984, Afroedura multiporis Rösler, 2000, Afroedura multiporis haackei Jacobson, 1992, Afroedura multiporis haackei Rösler, 2000, Afroedura multiporis multiporis Jacobson, 1992, Oedura pondolia multiporis Hewitt, 1925, endemic
    - Afroedura pondolia pondolia (Hewitt, 1925), Pondo rock gecko, syn. Oedura pondoensis, Oedura langi Fitzsimmons, 1930
  - Afroedura tembulica (Hewitt, 1926), Queenstown rock gecko, syn. Oedura tembulica Hewitt, 1926, endemic
  - Afroedura transvaalica (Hewitt, 1925)' Transvaal rock gecko, syn. Oedura transvaalica Hewitt, 1925, Oedura transvaalica Hewitt, 1925, Oedura transvaalica platyceps Hewitt, 1925, endemic to southern Africa
    - Afroedura transvaalica loveridgei Broadley, 1963, Loveridge’s rock gecko, syn. Oedura transvaalensis Fitzsimons, 1930, Afroedura loveridgei Bauer, 1997, Afroedura transvaalica loveridgei Broadley, 1963
    - Afroedura transvaalica transvaalica (Hewitt, 1925), Transvaal rock gecko, syn. Oedura transvaalica platyceps Hewitt, 1925
- Genus Afrogecko:
  - Afrogecko porphyreus (Daudin, 1802), syn. porphyreus Daudin, 1802, Phyllodactylus porphyreus Duméril, 1836, Phyllodactylus porphyreus cronwrigthi Hewitt, 1937, Phyllodactylus porphyreus namaquensis Hewitt, 1935, endemic
    - Afrogecko porphyreus porphyreus (Daudin, 1802), syn. Phyllodactylus porphyreus namaquensis, endemic
    - Afrogecko porphyreus cronwrigthi (Hewitt, 1937), syn. Phyllodactylus porphyreus, endemic
    - Afrogecko porphyreus namaquensis (Hewitt, 1935), syn. Phyllodactylus porphyreus, endemic
  - Afrogecko swartbergensis (Haacke, 1996), Swartberg leaf-toed gecko, syn. Phyllodactylus swartbergensis Haacke, 1996, endemic
- Genus Chondrodactylus:
  - Chondrodactylus angulifer Peters, 1870, Namib giant ground gecko, syn. Chondrodactylus weiri Boulenger, 1887
    - Chondrodactylus angulifer namibensis Haacke, 1976, Namib giant ground gecko, syn. Chondrodactylus angulifer Peters 1870
    - Chondrodactylus angulifer angulifer Peters, 1870, common giant ground gecko, syn. Chondrodactylus weiri Boulenger, 1887
  - Chondrodactylus bibronii (A. Smith, 1846), Bibron's thick-toed gecko, syn. Tarentola bibronii Smith, 1846, Pachydactylus bibronii Boulenger, 1885, Chondrodactylus bibronii Bauer & Lamb, 2005
  - Chondrodactylus turneri (Gray, 1864), Turner's thick-toed gecko, syn. Homodactylus turneri Gray, 1864, Pachydactylus (bibronii) var. stellatus Werner, 1910, Pachydactylus bibroni turneri Parker, 1936, Pachydactylus bibronii turneri Loveridge, 1947, Pachydactylus laevigatus turneri Benyr, 1995, Pachydactylus turneri Bates & Heideman, 1997, Chondrodactylus turneri laevigatus Bauer & Lamb, 2005, Pachydactylus turneri laevigatus Cimatti, 2007, Pachydactylus bibronii stellatus Werner, 1910, Pachydactylus laevigatus Fischer, 1888
- Genus Colopus:
  - Colopus kochii Fitzsimons, 1959, Cape Cross thick-toed gecko, syn. Pachydactylus kochii Fitzsimons, 1959
  - Colopus wahlbergii Peters, 1869, Walhberg's Kalahari gecko, syn. Colopus marshalli Fitzsimons, 1959, Colopus kalaharicus Fitzsimmons, 1932
    - Colopus wahlbergii furcifer Haacke, 1976, Striped ground gecko, syn. Colopus kalaharicus Fitzsimons, 1932
    - Colopus wahlbergii wahlbergii Peters, 1869, Kalahari ground gecko, syn. Colopus wahlbergii Peters, 1869
- Genus Cryptactites:
  - Cryptactites peringueyi (Boulenger, 1910), Peringuey's leaf-toed gecko, syn. Phyllodactylus peringueyi Boulenger, 1910 endemic
- Genus Goggia:
  - Goggia braacki (Good, Bauer & Branch, 1996), Braack's pygmy gecko, syn. Phyllodactylus braacki Good, Bauer & Branch, 1996, endemic
  - Goggia essexi (Hewitt, 1925), Essex's pygmy gecko, syn. Phyllodactylus essexi Hewitt, 1925, Phyllodactylus lineatus essexi Hewitt, 1937, endemic
  - Goggia gemmula Branch, (Bauer & Good, 1996), Richtersveld pygmy gecko, syn. Phyllodactylus gemmulus Branch, Bauer & Good, 1996, near endemic
  - Goggia hewitti (Branch, Bauer & Good, 1995), Hewitt's leaf-toed gecko, syn. Phyllodactylus hewitt Branch, Bauer & Good, 1995, Phyllodactylus lineatus rupicolus Fitzsimons, 1943, endemic
  - Goggia hexapora (Branch, Bauer & Good, 1995) Cederberg pygmy gecko, syn. Phyllodactylus hexaporus Branch, Bauer & Good, 1995, Phyllodactylus lineatus Fitzsimons, 1935, Phyllodactylus lineatus rupicolus Fitzsimons, 1943, endemic
  - Goggia lineata (Gray, 1838), striped pygmy gecko, syn. Diplodactylus lineatus Gray, 1845, Phyllodactylus lineatus Gray, 1838, Phyllodactylus lineatus lineatus Hewitt, 1937, Phyllodactylus porphyreus Werner, 1910, near endemic
  - Goggia microlepidota (Fitzsimons, 1939), Fitzsimons' leaf-toed gecko, syn. Phyllodactylus microlepidotus Fitzsimons, 1939, endemic
  - Goggia rupicola (Fitzsimons, 1938), Namaqua leaf-toed gecko, syn. Phyllodactylus rupicolus Branch et al., 1995, Phyllodactylus lineatus rupicolus Fitzsimons, 1938, endemic
- Genus Hemidactylus:
  - Hemidactylus mabouia (Moreau De Jonnès, 1818), Moreau's tropical house gecko, syn. Gecko mabuia Cuvier, 1829, Gekko aculeatus Spix, 1825, Gekko armatus Wied, 1824, Gekko cruciger Spix, 1825, Gekko incanescens Wied, 1824, Gekko mabouia Moreau De Jonnès, 1818, Gekko tuberculosus Raddi, 1823, Hemidactylus (Tachybates) armatus Fitzinger, 1846, Hemidactylus (Tachybates) mabuya Fitzinger, 1846, Hemidactylus benguellensis Bocage, 1893, Hemidactylus exaspis Cope, 1868, Hemidactylus frenatus calabaricus Boettger, 1878, Hemidactylus gardineri Boulenger, 1909, Hemidactylus mabouia mabouia Auerbach, 1987, Hemidactylus mandanus Loveridge, 1936, Hemidactylus mercatorius Gray, 1842, Hemidactylus persimilis Barbour & Loveridge, 1928, Hemidactylus platycephalus Peters, 1854, Hemidactylus sakalava Grandidier, 1867, Hemidactylus tasmani Hewitt, 1932, Hemidactylus tuberculosus Fitzinger, 1826, Gekko mabouia Moreau, 1818
- Genus Homopholis:
  - Homopholis muller Visser, 1987 Muller's velvet gecko, syn. Platypholis mulleri Kluge, 1993 endemic
  - Homopholis wahlbergii (A. Smith, 1849) Wahlberg's velvet gecko, syn. Geko walbergii Smith, 1849, Platypholis walbergii
    - Homopholis walbergii arnoldi Loveridge, 1944 Wahlberg's velvet gecko, syn. Homopholis walbergii Smith 1849
    - Homopholis walbergii walbergii (Smith, 1849) Wahlberg's velvet gecko, syn. Homopholis macrolepis Boulenger, 1885
- Genus Lygodactylus:
  - Lygodactylus angolensis Bocage, 1896, Angola dwarf gecko, syn. Lygodactylus laurae Schmidt, 1933, Lygodactylus (Lygodactylus) angolensis Rösler, 2000
  - Lygodactylus bradfieldi (Hewitt, 1932), Bradfield's dwarf gecko, syn. Lygodactylus capensis bradfieldi Auerbach, 1987, Lygodactylus (Lygodactylus) bradfieldi Rösler, 2000
  - Lygodactylus capensis Smith, 1849, Cape yellow-headed gecko, syn. Hemidactylus capensis Smith, 1849, Lygodactylus (Lygodactylus) capensis Rösler, 2000, Lygodactylus ngamiensis Fitzsimmons, 1932, Lygodactylus strigatus Gray, 1864
    - Lygodactylus capensis capensis (A. Smith, 1849) common dwarf gecko, syn. Lygodactylus strigatus Gray, 1864, Lygodactylus (Lygodactylus) capensis Rösler, 2000
    - Lygodactylus capensis pakenhami Loveridge, 1941 Cape dwarf gecko, syn. Lygodactylus capensis Boulenger, 1885, Lygodactylus grotei Sternfeld, 1911, Lygodactylus grotei pakenhami Loveridge, 1941, Lygodactylus (Lygodactylus) capensis Rösler, 2000
    - Lygodactylus capensis grotei Sternfeld, 1911, Cape dwarf gecko, syn. Lygodactylus ngamiensis Fitzsimmons, 1932, Lygodactylus grotei Sternfeld, 1911, Lygodactylus (Lygodactylus) capensis Rösler, 2000
  - Lygodactylus graniticolus Jacobsen, 1992, granite dwarf gecko, syn. Lygodactylus (Lygodactylus) graniticolus Rösler, 2000, endemic
  - Lygodactylus methueni Fitzsimons, 1937, woodbrush dwarf gecko, syn. Lygodactylus (Lygodactylus) methueni Rösler, 2000, endemic
  - Lygodactylus nigropunctatus Jacobsen, 1992 black-spotted dwarf gecko, syn. Lygodactylus nigropunctatus nigropunctatus Jacobsen, 1992, endemic
    - Lygodactylus nigropunctatus incognitus Jacobsen, 1992, cryptic dwarf gecko, syn. Lygodactylus nigropunctatus soutpansbergensis Jacobsen, 1992, Lygodactylus (Lygodactylus) nigropunctatus Rösler, 2000 endemic
    - Lygodactylus nigropunctatus montiscaeruli Jacobsen, 1992, Makgabeng dwarf gecko, syn. Lygodactylus (Lygodactylus) nigropunctatus incognitus Jacobsen, 1992, endemic
    - Lygodactylus nigropunctatus nigropunctatus Jacobsen, 1992, black-spotted dwarf gecko, syn. Lygodactylus (Lygodactylus) nigropunctatus Rösler, 2000, endemic
  - Lygodactylus ocellatus Roux, 1907, ocellated dwarf gecko, syn. Lygodactylus (Lygodactylus) ocellatus Rösler, 2000
    - Lygodactylus ocellatus ocellatus Roux, 1907, syn. Lygodactylus ocellatus Roux, 1907, endemic
    - Lygodactylus ocellatus soutpansbergensis Jacobsen, 1994, Soutpansberg Dwarf gecko, syn. Lygodactylus ocellatus Roux, 1907, endemic
  - Lygodactylus stevensoni Hewitt, 1926, Stevenson's dwarf gecko
  - Lygodactylus waterbergensis Jacobsen, 1992, Waterberg dwarf gecko, syn. Lygodactylus (Lygodactylus) waterbergensis Rösler, 2000, endemic
- Genus Narudasia:
  - Narudasia festiva Methuen & Hewitt, 1914, festive gecko, syn. Quedenfeldtia festiva Loveridge, 1947
- Genus Pachydactylus:
  - Pachydactylus affinis Boulenger, 1896, Transvaal gecko, syn. Pachydactylus formosus Roux, 1907, Pachydactylus formosus affinis Hewitt, 1910, Pachydactylus capensis affinis Hewitt, 1927, endemic
  - Pachydactylus amoenus Werner, 1910, Kamaggas gecko, endemic
  - Pachydactylus atorquatus Bauer et al., 2006, Augrabies gecko, endemic
  - Pachydactylus austeni Hewitt, 1923, Austen thick-toed gecko, syn. Pachydactylus austeni, endemic
  - Pachydactylus barnardi Fitzsimons, 1941, Barnard's thick-toed gecko, syn. Pachydactylus capensis barnardi Fizsimons, 1941, Pachydactylus rugosus barnadi Rösler, 2000 endemic
  - Pachydactylus capensis (A. Smith, 1846) Cape thick-toed gecko, syn. Tarentola capensis Smith, 1846, Pachydactylus capensis capensis Fitzsimons, 1935, Pachydactylus capensis katanganus De Witte, 1953, Pachydactylus capensis levyi Fitzsimons, 1933, Pachydactylus capensis oshaughnessyi Loveridge, 1947, Pachydactylus elegans Gray, 1845, Pachydactylus leopardinus Sternfeld, 1911, Pachydactylus mentalis Hewitt, 1926, Pachydactylus obscurus Thominot, 1889, Pachydactylus tessellatus Werner, 1910, Pachydactylus werneri Hewitt, 1935
  - Pachydactylus carinatus Bauer, Lamb & Branch, 2006, Richtersveld gecko, syn. Pachydactylus serval onscepensis Mclachlan 1966, Pachydactylus cf serval Bauer 2003, endemic to southern Africa
  - Pachydactylus formosus (A. Smith, 1849), Smith's thick-toed gecko, syn. Pachydactylus mento-marginatus Smith, 1849, Pachydactylus mentomarginatus Boulenger, 1885, Pachydactylus obscurus Thominot, 1889, Pachydactylus capensis formosus Loveridge, 1947, Pachydactylus mentomarginatus Smith, 1849, Pachydactylus rugosus formosus Joger, 1985, endemic
  - Pachydactylus geitje (Sparrman, 1778), Cradock thick-toed gecko, syn. Anoplopus inunguis Wagler, 1830, gecko inunguis Cuvier, 1817, gecko ocellatus Cuvier, 1817, Lacerta geitje Sparrman, 1778, Pachydactylus bergii Wiegmann, 1834, Pachydactylus ocellatus Boulenger, 1885, Platydactylus ocellatus Duméril & Bibron, 1836, endemic
  - Pachydactylus goodi Bauer, Lamb & Brach, 2006, Good's gecko, syn. Pachydactylus werberi Bauer 2005, endemic
  - Pachydactylus haackei Branch, Bauer, & Good, 1996 Haacke's thick-toed gecko, syn. Pachydactylus namaquensis Methuen & Hewitt, 1914, endemic
  - Pachydactylus kladeroderma Branch, Bauer & Good, 1996, fragile thick-toed gecko, syn. Pachydactylus namaquensis Fitzsimons, 1943, Pachydactylus kladeroderma Branch 1998 endemic
  - Pachydactylus labialis Fitzsimons, 1938, Western Cape thick-toed gecko, syn. Pachydactylus capensis labialis Fitzsimons, 1938, endemic
  - Pachydactylus maculatus Gray, 1845, spotted thick-toed gecko, syn. Pachydactylus maculatus albomarginatus Hewitt, 1932, Pachydactylus maculatus microlepis Hewitt, 1935, Pachydactylus maculosa Brock, 1932, endemic
  - Pachydactylus mariquensis Smith, 1849, Ceres thick-toed gecko, syn. Pachydactylus latirostris Hewitt, 1923, Pachydactylus mariequensis macrolepis Fitzsimons, 1939, Pachydactylus mariquensis macrolepis Fitzsimons, 1939, endemic
    - Pachydactylus mariquensis latirostris Hewitt, 1923, Ceres thick-toed gecko, syn. Pachydactylus mariquensis Smith, 1849, Pachydactylus latirostris Hewitt, 1923
    - Pachydactylus mariquensis mariquensis Smith, 1849, Ceres thick-toed gecko, syn. Pachydactylus mariquensis Smith, 1849
  - Pachydactylus montanus Methuen & Hewitt, 1914, Namaqua mountain gecko, syn. Pachydactylus serval Loveridge, 1947, Pachydactylus montanus montanus Fitzsimons, 1943, Pachydactylus montanus onscepensis Hewitt, 1935, Pachydactylus serval onceepensis Hewitt, 1935
  - Pachydactylus monticolus Fitzsimons, 1943, endemic
  - Pachydactylus namaquensis (Sclater, 1898), Namaqua thick-toed gecko, syn. Elasmodactylus namaquensis Sclater, 1898, near endemic
  - Pachydactylus oculatus Hewitt, 1927, golden spotted gecko, syn. Pachydactylus capensis oculatus Hewitt, 1927, endemic
  - Pachydactylus oshaughnessyi Boulenger, 1885, syn. Pachydactylus oshaughnessyi oshaughnessyi Boulenger 1885
  - Pachydactylus oshaughnessyi katanganus de Witte, 1953, syn. Pachydactylus oshaughnessyi Boulenger, 1885, Pachydactylus capensis katanganus de Witte, 1953
  - Pachydactylus oshaughnessyi oshaughnessyi Boulenger, 1885, syn. Pachydactylus oshaughnessyi Boulenger, 1885, Pachydactylus capensis levyi Fitzsimmons, 1933, Pachydactylus capensis oshaughnessyi Loveridge, 1947, Pachydactylus capensis oshaughnessyi Loveridge, 1947, Pachydactylus capensis o’shaughnessyi Pitman, 1934
  - Pachydactylus punctatus amoenoides Hewitt, 1935, pointed thick-toed gecko, syn. Pachydactylus punctatus Peters, 1854
  - Pachydactylus punctatus Peters, 1854, speckled gecko, syn. Pachydactylus langi Fitzsimons, 1932, Pachydactylus brunnthaleri Werner, 1913
  - Pachydactylus punctatus punctatus Peters, 1855, pointed thick-toed gecko, syn. Pachydactylus brunnthaleri Werner, 1913
  - Pachydactylus purcelli Boulenger, 1910 Purcell's gecko, syn. Pachydactylus (serval) purcelli Mclachlan & Spence, 1966, Pachydactylus serval purcelli Boulenger, 1910, Pachydactylus pardus Sternfeld, 1911
  - Pachydactylus rangei (Andersson, 1908) Namib web-footed gecko, syn. Syndactylosaura schultzei Werner, 1910, Palmato gecko rangei Andersson, 1908, Palmato gecko rangeri Pianka, 2003, endemic to southern Africa
  - Pachydactylus rugosus A. Smith, 1849, wrinkled thick-toed gecko, syn. Pachydactylus rugosus frater Hewitt, 1935, Pachydactylus rugosus rugosus Auerbach, 1987, endemic to southern Africa
  - Pachydactylus scutatus Hewitt, 1927, shielded thick-toed gecko, syn. Pachydactylus angolensis Bauer et al., 2002, Pachydactylus scutatus angolensis Loveridge, 1944, Pachydactylus robertsi Fitzsimons, 1938
    - Pachydactylus scutatus angolensis Loveridge, 1944, large-scaled gecko, syn. Pachydactylus scutatus Hewitt, 1927, Pachydactylus angolensis Bauer, 2002
    - Pachydactylus scutatus scutatus Hewitt, 1927, large-scaled gecko, syn. Pachydactylus scutatus Hewitt, 1927
  - Pachydactylus serval Werner, 1910, Werner's thick-toed gecko, syn. Pachydactylus pardus Sternfeld, 1911, Pachydactylus carinatus Bauer et al., 2006
    - Pachydactylus serval onsceepensis Hewitt, 1935, western spotted thick-toed gecko, syn. Pachydactylus pardus Sternfeld, 1911
    - Pachydactylus serval serval Werner, 1910, western spotted thick-toed gecko, syn. Pachydactylus serval Loveridge, 1947
  - Pachydactylus tigrinus Van Dam, 1921, tiger thick-toed gecko, syn. Pachydactylus capensis rhodesianus Loveridge, 1947, Pachydactylus capensis tigrinus Van Dam, 1921, restricted to southern Africa
  - Pachydactylus vansoni Fitzsimons, 1933, Van Son's thick-toed gecko, syn. Pachydactylus capensis vansoni Fitzsimons, 1933, near endemic
  - Pachydactylus visseri Bauer, Lamb & Branch, 2006, Visser's gecko, syn. Pachydactylus weberi Branch 1998, endemic to southern Africa
  - Pachydactylus weberi Roux, 1907, Weber's thick-toed gecko, syn. Pachydactylus weberi weberi Fitzsimons, 1938, Pachydactylus weberi gariesensis Loveridge, 1947, Pachydactylus capensis capensis Peters, 1870, Pachydactylus capensis gariesensis Hewitt, 1932, Pachydactylus capensis weberi Lawrence, 1936, Pachydactylus acuminatus Fitzsimmons, 1941, Pachydactylus goodi Bauer et al., 2006, Pachydactylus monicae Bauer et al., 2006, Pachydactylus visseri Bauer et al., 2006, near endemic
- Genus Phelsuma:
  - Phelsuma ocellata (Boulenger, 1885) Namaqua day gecko, syn. Rhoptropus ocellatus Boulenger, 1885, Phelsuma ocellata Schmidt, 1933, Rhoptropella ocellata Hewitt, 1937, near endemic
- Genus Ptenopus:
  - Ptenopus garrulus Smith, 1849, whistling gecko, syn. Stenodactylus garrulous Smith, 1849, Ptenopus maculatus Gray, 1866
  - Ptenopus garrulus garrulus (A. Smith, 1849), common barking gecko, syn. Ptenopus garrulus Fitzsimons & Brain, 1958, endemic to southern Africa
  - Ptenopus garrulus maculatus Gray, 1866, spotted barking gecko, syn. Ptenopus garrulus Boulenger, 1885, Ptenopus maculatus Gray, 1866, endemic to southern Africa
- Genus Rhoptropus:
  - Rhoptropus barnardi Hewitt, 1926, Barnard's Namib day gecko
  - Rhoptropus boultoni Schmidt, 1933, Boulton's Namib day gecko
    - Rhoptropus boultoni benguellensis Mertens, 1938, Boulton's Namib day gecko, syn. Rhoptropus boultoni Schmidt, 1933
    - Rhoptropus boultoni boultoni Schmidt, 1933, Boulton's Namib day gecko, syn. Rhoptropus boultoni Schmidt, 1933
    - Rhoptropus boultoni montanus Laurent, 1964, Boulton's Namib day gecko, syn. Rhoptropus boultoni Schmidt, 1933
  - Rhoptropus diporus Hewitt, 1935, day gecko, endemic

=== Gerrhosauridae ===
Family Gerrhosauridae

- Genus Broadleysaurus:
  - Broadleysaurus major (Duméril, 1851), rough-scaled plated lizard, syn. Gerrhosaurus major
- Genus Cordylosaurus:
  - Cordylosaurus subtessellatus (A. Smith, 1844), dwarf plated lizard, syn. Gerrhosaurus subtessellatus Smith, 1844, Pleurostrichus subtessellatus Gray, 1845, Gerrhosaurus trivittatus Peters, 1862, Cordylosaurus trivittatus australis Hewitt, 1932, Cordylosaurus trivittatus Gray, 1865
- Genus Gerrhosaurus:
  - Gerrhosaurus flavigularis Wiegmann, 1828, yellow-throated plated lizard, syn. Gerrhosaurus bibroni Smith, 1844, Gerrhosaurus flavigularis fitzsimonsi Loveridge, 1942, Gerrhosaurus flavigularis flavigularis Wiegmann, 1828, Gerrhosaurus flavigularis quadrilineata Boettger, 1883, Gerrhosaurus ocellatus Cocteau, 1834, Pleuortuchus [sic] chrysobronchus Smith, 1836, Pleuortuchus [sic] desjardinii Smith, 1836, endemic to sub-Saharan Africa
  - Gerrhosaurus major Duméril, 1851, rough-scaled plated lizard, syn. Gerrhosaurus major major Duméril, 1851, Gerrhosaurus bergi Werner, 1906, Gerrhosaurus grandis Boulenger, 1908, Gerrhosaurus major zechi Loveridge, 1936, Gerrhosaurus zechi Schmidt, 1919, Gerrhosaurus zanzibaricus Pfeffer, 1889, Gerrhosaurus major grandis Hewitt, 1910, Gerrhosaurus major bottegoi Del Prato, 1895, Gerrhosaurus bottegoi Del Prato, 1895
  - Gerrhosaurus intermedius Lönnberg, 1907, black-lined plated lizard, syn. Gerrhosaurus nigrolineatus nigrolineatus Hallowell, 1857, Gerrhosaurus nigro-lineatus Hallowell, 1857, Gerrhosaurus flavigularis intermedia Lönnberg, 1907, Gerrhosaurus flavigularis nigrolieatus Schmidt, 1919, Gerrhosaurus nigrolineatus australis Fitzsimons, 1939, Gerrhosaurus nigrolineatus ahlefedti Hellmich & Schmelcher, 1956
  - Gerrhosaurus typicus (A. Smith, 1837), Karoo plated lizard, syn. Pleurotuchus typicus Smith, 1837, endemic
- Genus Matobosaurus:
  - Matobosaurus validus Smith, 1849, common giant plated lizard, syn. Gerrhosaurus validus validus Smith, 1849, Gerrhosaurus ciprianii Gray, 1864, Gerrhosaurus maltzahni De Grys, 1938, Gerrhosaurus validus damarensis Fitzsimons, 1938, Gerrhosaurus robustus Peters, 1854, Gerrhosaurus validus maltzahni De Grys, 1938, Gerrhosaurus maltzahni De Grys, 1938, endemic to southern Africa
- Genus Tetradactylus:
  - Tetradactylus eastwoodae Hewitt & Methuen, 1913, Eastwoods whip lizard, endemic
  - Tetradactylus africanus (Gray, 1838), African whip lizard, syn. Tetredactylus africanus africanus (Gray, 1838), Tetredactylus fitzsimonsi Hewitt, 1915, Caitia africana Gray, 1838, Tetradactylus africanus fitzsimonsi Branch, 1988, Caitia africana Gray 1838, endemic
  - Tetradactylus breyeri Roux, 1907, Breyer's whip lizard, endemic
  - Tetradactylus fitzsimonsi Hewitt, 1915, FitzSimons' long-tailed seps, syn. Tetradactylus africanus fitzsimonsi endemic
  - Tetradactylus seps (Linnaeus, 1758) five-toed whip lizard, syn. Lacerta seps Linnaeus, 1758, Sincus [sic] sepiformis Schneider, 1801, Gerrhosaurus sepiformis Duméril & Bibron, 1839, Tetradactylus laevicauda Hewitt & Methuen, 1915, Tetradactylus seps laevicauda Loveridge, 1942, endemic
  - Tetradactylus tetradactylus (Daudin, 1802) longtail whip lizard, syn. Chalcides tetradactylus Daudin, 1802, Tetradactylus chalcidicus Merrem, 1820, Saurophis tetradactylus Wagler, 1830, Saurophis lacepedii Duméril & Bibron, 1839, Tetradactylus bilineatus Hewitt, 1926, Tetradactylus tetradactylus bilineatus Loveridge, 1942, endemic

=== Hydrophiidae ===
Family Hydrophiidae

- Genus Hydrophis:
  - Hydrophis platurus (Linnaeus, 1766), Yellow-bellied Sea Snake, syn. Anguis platura Linnaeus, 1766, Hydrophis pelamis Schlegel, 1837, Hydrophis (Pelamis) bicolor Fischer, 1855Hydrus bicolor Schneider, 1799,Hydrus platurus Boulenger, 1896' Pelamis bicolor Schneider, 1799, Pelamis bicolor sinuata Duméril, 1854, Pelamis bicolor variegata Duméril, 1854, Pelamis ornata Gray, 1842, Pelamis platuros Daudin, 1803, Pelamis platurus Smith, 1943, Pelamis schneider Rafinesque, 1817

=== Lacertidae ===
Family Lacertidae

- Genus Australolacerta:
  - Australolacerta australis (Hewitt 1926), southern rock lizard, syn. Lacerta australis Hewitt, 1926 endemic
- Genus Heliobolus:
  - Heliobolus lugubris (A. Smith, 1838), bushveld lizard, syn. Eremias dorsalis Duméril & Bibron, 1839, Eremias lugubris Duméril & Bibron, 1839, Lacerta lugubris Smith, 1838
- Genus Ichnotropis:
  - Ichnotropis capensis (A. Smith, 1838), Cape rough-scaled lizard, syn. Algyra capensis Smith, 1838, Tropidosaura dumerelii Smith, 1849, Ichnotropis microlepidota Peters, 1854, Ichnotropis microlepidota Peters, 1854, Ichnotropis dumerelii Bocage, 1866, Ichnotropis capensis Boulenger, 1897, Thermophilus capensis Fitzinger, 1843, Tropidosaura capensis Duméril, 1839 endemic to southern Africa
    - Ichnotropis capensis capensis (Smith, 1838), Cape rough-scaled lizard, syn. Tropidosaura capensis Dumeril & Bibron, 1839
    - Ichnotropis capensis nigrescens Laurent, 1952, Cape rough-scaled lizard, syn. Thermophilus capensis Dumeril & Bibron, 1844
  - Ichnotropis squamulosa (Peters, 1854), common rough-scaled lizard, endemic to southern Africa
- Genus Meroles:
  - Meroles ctenodactylus (A. Smith, 1838), Smith's sand lizard, syn. Eremias capensis Duméril & Bibron, 1839, Lacerta capensis Smith, 1838, Lacerta ctenodactylus Smith, 1838, Scapteira ctenodactyla Loveridge, 1936, Meroles ctenodactyla Burrage, 1978
  - Meroles cuneirostris (Strauch, 1867), wedge-snouted sand lizard, syn. Scapteira cuneirostris Strauch, 1867
  - Meroles knoxii (Milne-Edwards, 1829), Knox's ocellated sand lizard, syn. Lacerta knoxii Milne-Edwards, 1829, Eremias knoxii Duméril & Bibron, 1839
  - Meroles suborbitalis Peters, 1869, spotted sand lizard, syn. Eremias suborbitalis Peters, 1869, Scaptira suborbitalis Fitzsimons & Brain, 1958
- Genus Nucras:
  - Nucras caesicaudata Broadley, 1972, blue-tail scrub lizard
  - Nucras holubi (Steindachner, 1882), Holub's sandveld lizard, syn. Nucras holubi
  - Nucras intertexta (A. Smith, 1838), spotted sandveld lizard, syn. Lacerta intertexta Smith, 1838
  - Nucras lalandii (Milne-Edwards, 1829), Laland's lizard, syn. Lacerta lalandii Milne-Edwards, 1829, Lacerta delalandii Duméril & Bibron, 1839, Nucras delalandii Fitzsimons, 1992, endemic
  - Nucras livida (A. Smith, 1838), karoo sandveld lizard, syn. Nucras tessellata livida Smith, 1838 endemic
  - Nucras taeniolata (A. Smith, 1838), striped scrub lizard, syn. Nucras intertexta Fitzsimons & Brain, 1958, Eremias holubi Steindacher, 1882, Lacerta taeniolata Smith, 1838 endemic
  - Nucras taeniolata ornata (Gray, 1864), ornate sandveld lizard, syn. Teira ornata Gray, 1864, Nucras ornata Boycott, 1992
  - Nucras tessellata Smith, 1838, tiger lizard, syn. Lacerta tessellata Smith, 1838
- Genus Pedioplanis:
  - Pedioplanis burchelli (Duméril & Bibron, 1839), Burchell's sand lizard, syn. Eremias burchelli Duméril & Bibron, 1839, endemic
  - Pedioplanis inornata (Roux, 1907), plain sand lizard, syn. Pedioplanis undata inornata (Roux, 1907), Eremias inornata Roux, 1907, Eremias undata inornata Daan & Hillenius, 1966, endemic to southern Africa
  - Pedioplanis laticeps (A. Smith, 1849), karoo sand lizard, syn. Eremias burchelli Duméril 1839, Eremias laticeps Smith, 1849, Lacerta capensis Smith, 1838, Pedioplanis laticeps Makokha et al., 2007, endemic
  - Pedioplanis lineoocellata Duméril & Bibron, 1839, plain sand lizard, syn. Eremias inornata Roux 1907, Eremias undata inornata Daan 1966, Eremias lineo-ocellata Duméril & Bibron, 1839, Eremias formosa Smith, 1845, Eremias pulchra Smith, 1845, Eremias annulifera Smith, 1845, Eremias lineoocellata Duméril, 1839
    - Pedioplanis lineoocellata inocellata (Mertens, 1955), spotted sand lizard, syn. Eremias lineo-ocellata Duméril & Bibron, 1839
    - Pedioplanis lineoocellata lineoocellata (Duméril & Bibron, 1839), spotted sand lizard, syn. Eremias lineo-ocellata Duméril & Bibron, 1839n endemic to southern Africa
    - Pedioplanis lineoocellata pulchella Gray, 1845, spotted sand lizard, syn. Pedioplanis lineoocellata lineoocellata Auerbach, 1987, near endemic
  - Pedioplanis namaquensis (Duméril & Bibron, 1839), Namaqua sand lizard, syn. Eremias namaquensis Duméril & Bibron, 1839
  - Pedioplanis undata Smith, 1838, western sand lizard, syn. Lacerta undata Smith, 1838, Eremias undata Duméril & Bibron, 1839
- Genus Tropidosaura:
  - Tropidosaura cottrelli (Hewitt, 1925), Cottrell's mountain lizard, endemic
  - Tropidosaura essexi Hewitt, 1927, Essex's mountain lizard, endemic
  - Tropidosaura gularis Hewitt, 1927, Cape mountain lizard, endemic
  - Tropidosaura montana Duméril & Bibron, 1839, green-striped mountain lizard, endemic
    - Tropidosaura montana natalensis Fitzsimons, 1947 Natal mountain lizard, syn. Tropidosaura montana Duméril & Bibron 1839 endemic
    - Tropidosaura montana rangeri Hewitt, 1926 Ranger's mountain lizard, endemic
    - Tropidosaura montana montana (Gray, 1831), common mountain lizard, syn. Tropidosaura burchelli Smith, 1849, endemic
- Genus Vhembelacerta:
  - Vhembelacerta rupicola Fitzsimons 1933, Soutpansberg rock lizard, syn. Lacerta rupicola, endemic

=== Leptotyphlopidae ===
Family Leptotyphlopidae

- Genus Leptotyphlops:
  - Leptotyphlops conjunctus incognitus Broadley, 2007, Incognito thread snake, syn. Glauconia conjuncta Gough 1908, Leptotyphlops conjuncta Fitzsimons 1939, Leptotyphlops conjunctus Broadley 1971, Leptotyphlops emini Bogert 1940, Leptotyphlops incognitus Broadley 2007, Leptotyphlops nigricans Manacas 1957, Leptotyphlops scutifrons Wilson 1965, Stenostoma nigricans Peters 1882
  - Leptotyphlops distanti Boulenger, 1892, Distant's thread snake, syn. Leptotyphlops conjunctus distanti Mertens, 1955, Leptotyphlops conjuncta distanti Bogert, 1940, Glauconia distanti Boulenger in Distant, 1892, near endemic
  - Leptotyphlops gracilior Boulenger, 1910, Slender thread snake, syn. Glauconia gracilior Boulenger, 1910, Namibiana gracilior (Boulenger, 1910), Glauconia gracilior' Boulenger, 1910, Leptotyphlops graciliar Isemonger 1962
  - Leptotyphlops nigricans (Schlegel, 1839), Black thread snake Leptotyphlops nigricans nigricans Broadley & Watson, 1976, Stenostoma nigricans Duméril & Bibron, 1844, Typhlops nigricans Schlegel, 1839, Glauconia nigricans Gray, 1845, Leptotyphlops nigricans Fitzinger, 1843, Leptotyphlops jacobseni Broadley & Broadley, 1999, endemic
  - Leptotyphlops occidentalis Fitzsimons, 1962, Western thread snake, syn. Namibiana occidentalis (Fitzsimmons, 1962)
  - Leptotyphlops scutifrons (Peters, 1854), Peter's thread snake, syn. Stenostoma scutifrons Peters, 1854, Glauconia conjuncta Boulenger, 1893, Glauconia distanti Loveridge, 1923, Glauconia emini Sternfeld, 1912, Glauconia latifrons Sternfeld, 1910, Glauconia okahandjana Ahl, 1924, Glauconia scutifrons Boulenger, 1890, Glauconia signata Sternfeld, 1908, Leptotyphlops conjuncta Loveridge, 1933, Leptotyphlops conjuncta conjuncta Barbour & Loveridge, 1946, Leptotyphlops conjunctus Mcdiarmid et al., 1999, Leptotyphlops conjunctus conjunctus Laurent, 1956, Leptotyphlops distanti Barbour & Loveridge, 1928, Leptotyphlops emini emini Spawls, 1978, Leptotyphlops latifrons Broadley & Wallach, 2007, Leptotyphlops signatus Hahn, 1980, Stenostoma conjuncta Tornier, 1896, Leptotyphlops scutifrons scutifrons Broadley & Watson, 1976, Leptotyphlops scutifrons merkeri (Werner, 1909), Glauconia merkeri Werner, 1909, Stenostoma conjuncta Tornier, 1896, Glauconia distanti Loveridge, 1923, Glauconia emini Loveridge, 1916
    - Leptotyphlops scutifrons pitmani Broadley & Wallach 2007, Peter's thread snake, syn. Glauconia latifrons Sternfeld, 1908
    - Leptotyphlops scutifrons scutifrons (Peters, 1854), Peter's thread snake, syn. Glauconia scutifrons Boulenger, 1890
    - Leptotyphlops scutifrons merkeri (Werner, 1909), Peter's thread snake, syn. Glauconia merkeri Werner, 1909, Glauconia scutifrons Boulenger, 1893
  - Leptotyphlops sylvicolus Broadley & Wallach, 1997, forest thread snake, endemic
- Genus Myriopholis:
  - Myriopholis longicaudus (Peters, 1854), longtail blind snake, syn. Glauconia brevirostralis Fitzsimons, 1930, Glauconia fiechteri Scortecci, 1929, Glauconia longicauda Boulenger, 1890, Leptotyphlops fiechteri Parker, 1932, Leptotyphlops longicauda Loveridge, 1953, Stenostoma longicaudum Peters, 1854, Glauconia fiechteri Scortecci, 1929, Myriopholis longicauda Dalsteinsson, Branchm Trape, Vitt & Hedges, 2009

=== Pythonidae ===
Family Pythonidae

- Genus Python:
  - Python natalensis A. Smith, 1840, African rock python, syn. Python sebae natalensis Smith, 1840, Python saxuloides Miller & Smith, 1979, Python sebae Mcdiarmid, Campbell & Touré, 1999, endemic to the southern half of Africa

=== Scincidae ===
Family Scincidae

- Genus Acontias:
  - Acontias bicolor Hewitt, 1929, Cregoe's legless skink, syn. Typhlosaurus cregoi bicolor Hewitt, 1929
  - Acontias breviceps Essex, 1925, shorthead lance skink, endemic
  - Acontias cregoi (Boulenger, 1903) Cregoe's legless skink, syn. Typhlosaurus cregoi Boulenger, 1903, near endemic
  - Acontias fitzsimonsi (Broadley, 1968) FitzSimon's legless skink, syn. Typhlosaurus aurantiacus fitzsimonsi Broadley, 1968, endemic
  - Acontias gariepensis (Fitzsimons, 1941) Mier Kalahari legless skink, FitzSimon's legless skink, syn. Typhlosaurus gariepensis Fitzsimons, 1941, endemic to southern Africa
  - Acontias gracilicauda Essex, 1925, thin-tailed legless skink, syn. Acontias gracilicauda (Essex, 1925), endemic
    - Acontias gracilicauda gracilicauda Essex, 1925, slendertail lance skink, syn. Acontias gracilicauda Daniels et al., 2005, endemic
    - Acontias gracilicauda namaquensis Hewitt, 1938 Namaqua lance skink, endemic
  - Acontias grayi Boulenger, 1887, striped legless skink, Gray dwarf legless skink, syn. Acontias lineatus Peters, 1879 endemic
  - Acontias kgalagadi subtaeniatus (Broadley, 1887), striped legless skink, syn. Typhlosaurus lineatus lineatus Boulenger, 1887, Typhlosaurus lineatus subtaeniatus Broadley, 1887, endemic
  - Acontias lineatus Peter, 1879, striped dwarf legless skink, syn. Microacontias lineatus (Peters, 1879) endemic
  - Acontias lineicauda Hewitt, 1937 Algoa legless skink endemic
  - Acontias litoralis Broadly & Greer, 1969, coastal dwarf legless skink, Broadley's lance skink, syn. Microacontias litoralis (Broadley & Greer 1969), endemic
  - Acontias meleagris (Linnaeus, 1758), Cape legless skink, Linnaeus' lance skink, syn. Anguis meleagris Linnaeus, 1758, endemic
    - Acontias meleagris meleagris (Linnaeus, 1758), Linnaeus' lance skink, syn. Acontias meleagris Linnaeus, 1758 endemic
  - Acontias namaquensis Hewitt, 1938 Namaqua lance skink, syn. Acontias gracilicauda namaquensis Hewitt, 1938, endemic
  - Acontias orientalis (Hewitt, 1938) Namaqua lance skink, syn. Acontias meleagris orientalis Hewitt, 1938 endemic
  - Acontias parietalis (Broadley, 1990) Maputaland legless skink, syn. Acontias aurantiacus parietalis Broadley, 1990 endemic to southern Africa
  - Acontias percivali Loveridge, 1935, Percival's lance skink
    - Acontias percivali percivali Loveridge, 1935 Percival's lance skink, syn. Acontias percivali Loveridge, 1935
    - Acontias percivali occidentalis Fitzsimmons, 1941, Percival's lance skink, syn. Acontias percivali
    - Acontias percivali tasmani Hewitt, 1938, Percival's lance skink, syn. Acontias percivali occidentalis
  - Acontias plumbeus Bianconi, 1849, giant lance skink, syn. Acontias plumbeus Bianconi, 1849, Acontias niger Peters, 1854
  - Acontias poecilus Bourquin & Lambiris, 1996, variable legless skink, syn. Acontias poecilus Bourquin & Lambiris, 1996, endemic
  - Acontias richardi (Jacobsen, 1987) Richard's legless skink, syn. Typhlosaurus lineatus richardi Jacobsen, 1987, endemic
  - Acontias rieppeli Lamb, Biswas & Bauer, 2010, wood-bush legless skink, syn. Acontophiops lineatus Sternfeld, 1911, Typhlosaurus rieppeli Welch, 1982, Acontophiops lineatus Branch, 1988, Acontophiops lineatus Daniels et al., 2006, endemic
- Genus Afroablepharus:
  - Afroablepharus maculicollis (Jacobsen & Broadley, 2000), spotted-neck snake-eyed skink, endemic to southern half of Africa
  - Afroablepharus wahlbergii (A. Smith, 1849), Wahlberg's snake-eyed skink, endemic to sub-Saharan Africa
- Genus Lygosoma:
  - Lygosoma afrum Peters, 1854, Peters' eyelid skink, syn. Lygosoma afer Greer et al. 1985, Eumeces afer Peters, 1854, Eumeces perdicicolor Cope, 1868, Euprepes (Senira) dumerili Steindacher, 1870, Lygosoma sundevalli Schmidt, 1919, Mochlus afer Bocage, 1867, Mochlus punctulatus Günther, 1864
- Genus Mochlus:
  - Mochlus sundevalli (Smith, 1849), Sundevall’s writhing skink, syn. Eumices (Riopa) sunderallii Smith, 1849, Eumeces reticulatus Peters, 1862, Sepacontias modestus Günther, 1880, Lygosoma modestum Boulenger, 1895, Sepacontias modestus Günther, 1895, Lygosoma laeviceps modestum Sternfeld, 1912, Riopa sundevalli Smith, 1937, Riopa modesta modesta Mertens, 1938, Lygosoma sundevalli sundevalli Auerbach, 1987, Lygosoma sundevalli modestum Lanza, 1988
- Genus Panaspis:
  - Panaspis maculilabris Jacobson & Broadley, 2000, endemic
  - Panaspis wahlbergii Smith, 1849, Wahlberg's snake-eyed skink, syn. Ablepharus wahlbergi Loveridge, 1957, Afroablepharus wahlbergi Greer, 1974, Afroblepharus wahlbergi Auerbach, 1987, Cryptoblepharus wahlbergi Smith, 1849, Panaspis wahlbergii Boycott, 1992
- Genus Scelotes:
  - Scelotes anguinus (Boulenger, 1887), Algoa dwarf burrowing skink, syn. Herpetoseps anguinus Boulenger, 1887, Herpetosaura anguinea Tornier, 1902, endemic
  - Scelotes arenicola (Peters, 1854), Zululand dwarf burrowing skink, syn. Scelotes arenicola Boulenger, 1887, Scelotes arenicola arenicola Broadley, 1990, Scelotes arenicola Greer, 1970, Herpetosaura arenicola Peters, 1854 Near endemic
    - Scelotes arenicolus arenicolus (Peters, 1854), syn. Herpetosaura arenicola Tornier, 1902
    - Scelotes arenicolus insularis Broadley, 1990, syn. Scelotes arenicola Boulenger, 1887
  - Scelotes bicolor (Smith, 1849), two-colored burrowing skink, syn. Lithophilus bicolor Smith, 1849, Scelotes arenicola (Branch & Bauer, 2005), endemic
  - Scelotes bidigittatus Fitzsimons, 1930, lowveld dwarf burrowing skink, syn. Herpetosaura bidigittata Witte & Laurent, 1943, Scelotes bidigittata Greer, 1970 endemic
  - Scelotes bipes (Linnaeus, 1766), common burrowing skink, syn. Anguis bipes Linnaeus, 1766, Scelotes linnaei Duméril & Bibron, 1839 endemic
  - Scelotes caffer (Peters, 1861), Peters' burrowing skink, syn. Sepomorphus caffer Peters, 1861, endemic
  - Scelotes capensis A. Smith, 1849, Cape burrowing skink, syn. Gongylus capensis Smith, 1849, Seps capensis Günther, 1871, Sepsina weberi Roux, 1907, endemic
  - Scelotes duttoni Broadley, 1990
  - Scelotes gronovii (Daudin, 1802), Gronovi's dwarf burrowing skink, syn. Seps gronovii Daudin, 1802, endemic
  - Scelotes guentheri Boulenger, 1887, Günther's burrowing skink, syn. Herpetosaura inornata Günther, 1873, Herpetosaura guentheri Witte & Laurent, 1943, endemic
  - Scelotes inornatus Smith, 1849, Smith's dwarf burrowing skink, syn. Herpetosaura inornata Günther, 1873, Lithophilus inornatus Smith, 1849, Scelotes brevipes Visser, 1984, Scelotes inonatus Boulenger, 1887, Scelotes inornata Greer, 1970, Scelotes inornatus Broadley, 1994, Scelotes inornatus inornatus Fitzsimons, 1943, Scelotes natalensis Hewitt, 1921, endemic
  - Scelotes kasneri Fitzsimons, 1939, Kasner's burrowing skink endemic
  - Scelotes limpopoensis Fitzsimons, 1930, Limpopo burrowing skink, endemic
    - Scelotes limpopoensis albiventris Jacobsen, 1987, white-bellied dwarf burrowing skink, syn. Scelotes limpopoensis Fitzsimons 1930, endemic
    - Scelotes limpopoensis limpopoensis Fitzsimons, 1930, Limpopo dwarf burrowing skink
  - Scelotes mirus (Roux, 1907), montane dwarf burrowing skink, syn. Herpetosaura mira Roux, 1907, Scelotes mira Hewitt, 1921, endemic
  - Scelotes montispectus Bauer et al., 2003, Bloubergstrand dwarf burrowing skink, endemic
  - Scelotes mossambicus (Peters, 1882), Mozambique dwarf burrowing skink, syn. Herpetosaura arenicola Bocage, 1882, Herpetosaura brevipes Witte & Laurent, 1943, Herpetosaura inornata Witte & Laurent, 1943, Herpetosaura inornata mossambica Peters, 1882, Scelotes arenicola Bocage, 1896, Scelotes brevipes Hewitt, 1925, Scelotes guentheri Ohdner, 1908, Scelotes inornatus inornatus Visser, 1984, Scelotes inornatus mossambicus Bruton & Haacke, 1980, near endemic
  - Scelotes sexlineatus Harlan, 1824, striped dwarf burrowing skink, syn. Seps sexlineatus Boulenger, 1887, Scelotes bipes sexlineatus Welch, 1982, endemic
  - Scelotes vestigifer Broadley, 1994, coastal dwarf burrowing skink, syn. Scelotes arenicola Bruton & Haacke, 1980, near endemic
- Genus Trachylepis:
  - Trachylepis acutilabris Peters, 1862, sharp-lipped mabuya, syn. Euprepes acutilabris Peters, 1862, Euprepis acutilabris Mausfeld et al., 2002, Mabuya acutilabris Schmidt, 1919
  - Trachylepis capensis (Gray, 1831), Cape three-lined skink, syn. Euprepis capensis Mausfeld et al., 2002, Herinia capensis Gray, 1839, Mabuya capensis Fitzsimons, 1943, Scincus trivittatus Cuvier, 1829, Tiliqua capensis Gray, 1831, Trachylepis capensis Bauer, 2003, endemic to southern parts of Africa
  - Trachylepis depressa (Peters, 1854), eastern coastal skink, syn. Euprepes depressus Peters, 1854, Euprepis depressus Mausfeld et al., 2002, Mabuya depressa Broadley, 2000, Mabuya homalocephala depressa Branch, 1988 endemic to southern Africa
  - Trachylepis homalocephala (Wiegmann, 1828), Red-sided skink, syn. Euprepes depressus Peters, 1854, Euprepis homalocephalus Mausfeld et al., 2002, Lacerta punctata Linnaeus, 1758, Mabuia homalocephala Boulenger, 1887, Mabuya homalocephala smithii Fitzsimons, 1943, Mabuya maculata (Gray, 1845), Mabuya punctata Anderson, 1900, Scincus homolocephalus Gray, 1831, Scincus homolocephalus [sic] Wiegmann, 1828, Trachylepis homalocephala Bauer, 2003, Mabuya homalocephala Branch, 1998, endemic
  - Trachylepis margaritifer (Peters, 1854), rainbow skink, syn. Euprepes margaritifer Peters, 1854, Euprepis margaritiferus Mausfeld et al., 2002, Mabuya margaritifer Cooper, 2005, Mabuya margaritifera Broadley & Bauer, 1999, Mabuya obsti Werner, 1913, Mabuya quinquetaeniata margaritifer Broadley & Howell, 1991, Mabuya quinquetaeniata obsti Loveridge, 1936, Trachylepis margaritifera Peters 1854, endemic to Africa
  - Trachylepis occidentalis (Peters, 1867), western three-striped skink, syn. Euprepes occidentalis Peters, 1867, Euprepes vittatus australis Peters, 1862, Euprepis occidentalis Mausfeld et al., 2002, Mabuia calaharica Werner, 1910, Mabuya occidentalis Fitzsimons & Brain, 1958, endemic to Africa
  - Trachylepis punctatissima (A. Smith, 1849), montane speckled skink, syn. Euprepes (Euprepis) grützneri Peters, 1869, Euprepes puntatissimus Smith, 1849, Euprepes sunderalli Smith, 1849, Euprepis punctatissima Mausfeld et al., 2003, Mabuya punctatissima Broadley, 2000, Mabuya striata Fitzsimons, 1943, Mabuya striata punctassima Broadley, 1977, Mabuya striata punctassimus Bauer et al., 1995, endemic to southern half of Africa
  - Trachylepis punctulata (Bocage, 1872), speckled sand skink, syn. Euprepes punctulatus Bocage, 1872, Mabuya damarana Fitsimons, 1943, Mabuya longiloba triebneri Mertens, 1954, Mabuya variegata Broadley, 1971, Mabuya variegata punctulata Broadley, 1975, Mabuya punctulata Broadley, 2000, Euprepis punctulatus Mausfeld et al., 2002, endemic to southern half of Africa
  - Trachylepis quinquetaeniata (Lichtenstein, 1823), rainbow skink, syn. Scincus quinquetaeniatus Lichtenstein 1823, Mabuya quinquetaeniata Fitzinger, 1826, Euprepes savignyi Duméril & Bibron, 1839, Trachylepis savignyi Fitzinger, 1843, Eupressis quinquetaeniatus Blanford, 1870, Euprepes quinquetaeniatus Boettger, 1880, Mabuia quinquetaeniata scharica Sternfeld, 1917, Mabuia albilabris Chabanaud, 1917, Mabuia semicollaris Werner, 1917, Mabuya quinquetaeniata quinquetaeniata Loveridge, 1936, Trachylepis quinquetaeniata Bauer, 2003
    - Trachylepis quinquetaeniata langheldi (Sternfeld, 1917), rainbow skink, syn. Trachylepis quinquetaeniata langheldi (Sternfeld, 1917), Mabuya quinquetaeniata langheldi Sternfeld, Mabuya langheldi Böhme, 1985
    - Trachylepis quinquetaeniata riggenbachi (Sternfeld, 1910) African five-lined skink, syn. Trachylepis quinquetaeniata riggenbachi (Sternfeld, 1910), Mabuya riggenbachi Bauer et al., 2003
  - Trachylepis spilogaster Peters, 1882, spiny mabuya, syn. Euprepes (Euprepis) striatus spilogaster Peters, 1882, Mabuya spilogaster Bradley, 1969, Mabuya striata Fitzsimons, 1943, Mabuya striata spilogaster Mertens, 1955, Euprepes (Euprepis) striatus Peters, 1882, Euprepes (Euprepis) spilogaster Mausfeld, 2002
  - Trachylepis striata wahlbergii (Peters, 1869), Wahlberg's skink, syn. Mabuya striata wahlbergi, endemic
  - Trachylepis striata Peters, 1884, striped skink, syn. Tropidolepisma striatum Peters, 1844, Euprepes punctatissimus Peters, 1854, Euprepes wahlbergi Peters, 1870, Euprepis grantii Gray, 1864, Euprepis striatus Mausfeld et al., 2002, Mabouia striata Günther, 1895, Mabuya ellenbergeri Chabanaud, 1917, Mabuya striata Fitzsimons, 1943, Mabuya striata ellenbergeri Loveridge, 1953, Mabuya striata striata Loveridge, 1953, Mabuya striata wahlbergi Broadley, 1971, Mabuya wahlbergi Broadley, 2000, Trachylepis striata striata (Peters, 1844), Trachylepis striata wahlbergi (Peters, 1869), Mabuia striata Boulenger, 1895, endemic to Africa
    - Trachylepis striata striata (Peters, 1844), African striped mabuya, syn. Mabuya striata Fitzsimons & Bain, 1958
    - Trachylepis striata wahlbergi (Peters, 1869), African striped mabuya, syn. Mabuia striata Boulenger, 1895
  - Trachylepis sulcata sulcata Peters, 1867, western rock skink, syn. Euprepes olivaceus Peters, 1862, Euprepes sulcatus Peters, 1867, Mabuya sulcata (Peters, 1867), Euprepis sulcatus Mausfeld, 2002, endemic
  - Trachylepis varia (Peters, 1867), variable skink, syn. Euprepes (Euprepis) isselii Peters, 1871, Euprepes (Euprepis) varius Peters, 1867, Euprepes (Mabuya) laevigatus Peters, 1869, Euprepes damaranus Peters, 1870, Euprepes varius Fischer, 1884, Mabuia varia Boulenger, 1895, Mabuya damarana Fitzsimons & Bain, 1958, Mabuya varia Auerbach, 1987, Mabuya varia damaranus Loveridge, 1936, Mabuya varia nyikae Loveridge, 1953, Mabuya varia varia Loveridge, 1936, Euprepis varius Mausfeld, 2002, endemic to Africa
  - Trachylepis variegata (Peters, 1870), variegated skink, syn. Euprepes variegatus Peters, 1870, Mabuia varia longiloba Methuen & Hewitt, 1914, Mabuya damarana Fitzsimons, 1943, Mabuya longiloba longiloba Mertens, 1955, Mabuya variegata Greer et al., 2000, Mabuya variegata variegata Broadley, 1975, Euprepis variegatus Mausfeld, 2002, endemic to southern Africa
- Genus Typhlacontias:
  - Typhlacontias johnsonii Anderson, 1916, endemic
- Genus Typhlosaurus:
  - Typhlosaurus aurantiacus Peters, 1854, Typhline aurantiaca Peters, 1854, Acontias aurantiacus (Peters, 1854)
    - Typhlosaurus aurantiacus bazarutoensis Broadley, 1990, syn. Acontias aurantiacus bazarutoensis Broadley, 1990
    - Typhlosaurus aurantiacus aurantiacus (Peters, 1854), Typhlosaurus aurantiacus Bauer et al., 1995, Acontias aurantiacus aurantiacus (Peters, 1854)
    - Typhlosaurus aurantiacus carolinensis Broadley, 1990, syn. Acontias aurantiacus carolinensis Broadley, 1990
  - Typhlosaurus caecus (Cuvier, 1816 [1817]), Cuvier's legless skink, syn. Acontias caecus Cuvier, 1817, Typhline cuvierii Duméril & Bibron, 1839, endemic
  - Typhlosaurus cregoi cregoi Boulenger, 1903, Cregoe's legless skink, syn. Typhlosaurus cregoi Boulenger, 1903
  - Typhlosaurus lineatus Boulenger, 1887, striped legless skink, syn. Acontias kgalagadi Lamb, Biswas & Bauer, 2010, endemic to southern Africa
  - Typhlosaurus lineatus lineatus Boulenger, 1887, striped legless skink, syn. Typhlosaurus lineatus Boulenger, 1887
  - Typhlosaurus lomiae Haacke, 1986 Lomi's blind legless skink, syn. Typhlosaurus lomii Haacke, 1986, endemic
  - Typhlosaurus meyeri Boettger, 1894, Meyer's legless skink, syn. Typhlosaurus plowesi Fitzsimons, 1943
  - Typhlosaurus vermis Boulenger, 1887 Boulenger's legless skink

=== Typhlopidae ===
Family Typhlopidae

- Genus Afrotyphlops:
  - Afrotyphlops bibronii (A. Smith, 1846), Bibron's blind snake, syn. Onychocephalus bibronii Smith, 1846, Afrotyphlops bibronii (Smith, 1846), near endemic
  - Afrotyphlops fornasinii (Bianconi, 1849), Fornasini's blind snake, syn. Afrotyphlops fornasinii Bianconi, 1847, Onychocephalus trilobus Peters, 1854, Onychocephalus mossambicus Peters, 1854, Onychocephalus tettensis Peters, Typhlops bianconii Jan, in Jan & Sordelli, 1860, Typhlops mossambicus Boulenger, 1893, Typhlops tettensis Boulenger, 1893, endemic to southern Africa
- Genus Megatyphlops:
  - Megatyphlops mucruso (Peter, 1854), Zambezi giant blind snake, syn. Onychocephalus mucruso Peter, 1854
  - Megatyphlops schlegelii (Bianconi, 1847), Schlegel's giant blind snake, syn. Typhlops schlegelii Bianconi, 1847, Onychocephalus petersii Bocage, 1873, Rhinotyphlops brevis Spawls et al., 2001, Typhlops (Onychocephalus) humbo Bocage, 1886, Typhlops brevis Scortecci, 1929, Typhlops hottentotus Bocage, 1893, Typhlops humbo Boulenger, 1893, Typhlops schlegelii brevis Parker, 1949, Typhlops schlegelii schlegelii Loveridge, 1933, Megatyphlops schlegelii (Bianconni, 1847), Megatyphlops schlegelii schlegelii (Peters 1860), Onychocephalus schlegelii Peters, 1860, Rhinotyphlops schlegelii schlegelii Roux-Estève, 1974, Megatyphlops schlegelii petersii (Bocage, 1873), Typhlops humbo Boulenger, 1893, Rhinotyphlops schlegelii petersii Roux-Estève, 1974, endemic to the southern half of Africa
- Genus Ramphotyphlops:
  - Ramphotyphlops braminus (Daudin, 1803) Brahminy blind snake, syn. Argyrophis bramicus Kelaart, 1854, Argyrophis truncatus Gray, 1845, Eryx braminus Daudin, 1803, Glauconia braueri Sternfeld, 1910, Onychocephalus capensis Smith, 1846, Ophthalmidium tenue Hallowell, 1861, Tortrix russelii Merrem, 1820, Typhlina braminus McDowell, 1974, Typhlops braminus Duméril, 1844, Typhlops limbrickii Annandale, 1906, Typhlops pseudosaurus Dryden, 1969, Typhlops russeli Schlegel, 1839, Typhlops (Typhlops) euproctus Boettger, 1882, Typhlops (Typhlops) inconspicuus Jan, 1863, endemic
- Genus Rhinotyphlops:
  - Rhinotyphlops boylei Fitzsimons, 1932, Boyle's beaked blind snake, syn. Typhlops boylei Fitzsimons, 1932
  - Rhinotyphlops lalandei (Schlegel, 1839), Delalande's beaked blind snake, syn. Onychophis delalandii Duméril & Bibron, 1844, Onychophis fordii Gray, 1845, Onychophis franklinii Gray, 1845, Onychophis lalandeii Gray, 1845, Typhlops (Onychocephalus) delalandei Boettger, 1887, Typhlops delalandei paucisquamata Boettger, 1898, Typhlops delalandi Boulenger, 1887, Typhlops lalandei Schlegel, 1839, Typhlops lalandei paucisquamosa Boettger, 1883, Typhlops smithi Jan (in Jan & Sordelli), 1860, endemic to southern Africa
  - Rhinotyphlops schinzi (Boettger, 1887), Schinz's beaked blind snake, syn. Typhlops (Onychocephalus) schinzi Boettger, 1887, Typhlops schinzi Boulenger, 1893, endemic
  - Rhinotyphlops schlegelii petersii (Bocage, 1873), Peters' giant blind snake, syn. Rhinotyphlops schlegelii schlegelii (Peters 1860), Onychocephalus petersii Bocage, 1873, Typhlops hottentotus Bocage 1893
    - Rhinotyphlops schlegelii brevis (Scortecci, 1929), Schlegel's giant blind snake, syn. Rhinotyphlops schlegelii Mcdiarmid, Campbell & Touré, 1999, Rhinotyphlops brevis Spawls et al., 2001, Typhlops brevis Scortecci, 1929, Typhlops schlegelii brevis Parker, 1949
    - Rhinotyphlops schlegelii schlegelii (Peters, 1860), Schlegel's giant blind snake, syn. Typhlops schlegelii Boulenger, 1893, Typhlops schlegelii schlegelii Loveridge, 1933, Onychocephalus schlegelii Peters 1860
- Genus Typhlops:
  - Typhlops obtusus Peters, 1865, Southern gracile blind-snake, syn. Letheobia obtusa (Peters, 1865), Typhlops (Onychocephalus) obtusus Peters, 1865, Typhlops tettensis obtusus Loveridge, 1953, Typhlops obtusus obtusus Laurent, 1968, Typhlops obtusus palgravei Laurent, 1968, Lethobia obtusa (Peters, 1865)

=== Varanidae ===
Family Varanidae

- Genus Varanus:
  - Varanus albigularis Daudin, 1802, white-throated monitor lizard, syn. Varanus albigularis albigularis Daudin, 1802, Regenia albogularis Günther, 1861, Varanus (Polydaedalus) albigularis Böhme, 2002, Varanus exanthematicus albigularis Schmidt, 1919, Varanus exanthematicus angolensis Mertens, 1937, Varanus exanthematicus ionidesi Laurent, 1964, Varanus exanthematicus microstictus Mertens, 1942, Varanus microstictus Boettger, 1893, Monitor albigularis Gray, 1831, Monitor exanthematicus capensis Schlegel, 1844, Monitor exanthematicus capensis Schelgel, 1844, Tupinambis albigularis Daudin, 1802, Varanus albogularis Dumeril, 1836, Varanus gilli Smith, 1831
    - Varanus albigularis albigularis (Daudin, 1802), rock monitor
    - Varanus albigularis angolensis Schmidt, 1933, rock monitor, syn. Varanus exanthematicus angolensis Mertens, 1937
    - Varanus albigularis ionidesi Laurent, 1964, rock monitor, syn. Varanus exanthematicus ionidesi Laurent, 1964
    - Varanus albigularis microstictus Boettger, 1893, rock monitor, syn. Varanus exanthematicus microstictus Mertens, 1942, Varanus microstictus Boettger, 1893
  - Varanus niloticus (Linnaeus, 1758), Nile monitor, syn. Lacerta capensis Sparrman, 1783, Lacerta monitor Linnaeus, 1758, Lacerta nilotica Linnaeus, 1766, Lacertus tupinambis Lacépède, 1788, Monitor niloticus Lichtenstein, 1818, Monitor pulcher Leach in Bowdich, 1819, Stellio saurus Laurenti, 1768, Tupinambis elegans Daudin, 1802, Tupinambis stellatus Daudin, 1802, Varanus (Polydaedalus) niloticus Mertens, 1942, Monitor elegans senegalensis Schlegel, 1844

=== Viperidae ===
Family Viperidae

- Genus Bitis:
  - Bitis albanica Hewitt, 1937, Albany adder, syn. Bitis cornuta albanica Hewitt, 1937 Endemic
  - Bitis arietans Merrem, 1820, puff adder, syn. Bitis arietans arietans (Merrem, 1820), Cobra clotho Laurenti, 1768, Echidna arietans Duméril & Bibron, 1854 (1425), Cobra lachesis Mertens, 1938, Bitis (Bitis) arietans Lenk et al., 1999, Vipera (Echidna) arietans Merrem, 1820, Bitis lachesis somalica Parker, 1949, Bitis arietans somalica Parker, 1949
    - Bitis arietans arietans (Merrem, 1820), puff adder, syn. Vipera (Echidna) arietans arietans (Merrem, 1820)
    - Bitis arietans somaliaca Parker, 1949, puff adder, syn. Cobra lachesis Laurenti, 1768, Bitis lachesis somalica Parker, 1949
  - Bitis armata Smith, 1826, southern adder, syn. Vipera armata Smith, 1826, Vipera (Echidna) atropoides Smith, 1846, Bitis inornata Boulenger, 1896, Bitis cornuta cornuta Fitzsimons, 1962, Bitis cornuta inornata Underwood, 1968, Bitis atropoides Branch, 1997, Vipera armata Branch, 1999, endemic
  - Bitis atropos Linnaeus, 1758, mountain adder, syn. Coluber atropos Linnaeus, 1758, Bitis (Calechidna) atropos Lenk et al., 1999, Vipera montana Smith, 1826, Echidna atropos Duméril & Bibron, 1854
    - Bitis atropos atropos (Linnaeus, 1758), mountain adder, syn. Vipera montana Smith, 1826, near endemic
    - Bitis atropos unicolor, mountain adder, syn. Echidna atropos Duméril & Bibron, 1854
  - Bitis caudalis (A. Smith, 1839), horned adder, syn. Vipera ocellata Smith, 1838, Vipera (Cerastes) caudalis Duméril & Bibron, 1854, Bitis (Calechidna) caudalis Lenk et al. 1999
  - Bitis cornuta (Daudin, 1803), many-horned adder, syn. Vipera cornuta Daudin, 1803, Vipera lophophris Cuvier, 1829, Cerastes cornuta Gray, 1842, Clotho cornuta Gray, 1849, Cerastes lophophrys Duméril & Bibron, 1854, Cobra cornuta Mertens, 1937, Bitis cornuta cornuta Bogert, 1940, Bitis (Calechidna) cornuta Lenk et al., 1999, Vipera lophophrys Wagler, 1830, endemic to southwestern Africa
  - Bitis gabonica (Duméril, Bibron & Duméril, 1854), Gabbon adder, syn. Bitis gabonica gabonica (Duméril, Bibron & Duméril, 1854), Urobelus gabonica (Lebreton, 1999), Bitis (Macrocerastes) gabonica Lenk et al., 1999, Vipera rhinoceros Schlegel, 1855, Echidna rhinoceros Duméril, 1856, Clotho rhinoceros Cope, 1859, Bitis rhinoceros Peters, 1882, Cerastes nasicornis Hallowell, 1847, Echidna gabonica Duméril, Bibron & Duméril, 1854, Bitis gabonica rhinoceros (Schlegel, 1855), Bitis rhinoceros Peters, 1882
    - Bitis gabonica gabonica (Duméril, Bibron & Duméril 1854), Gabbon adder, syn. Cerastes nasicornis Hallowell, 1847
    - Bitis gabonica rhinoceros (Schlegel, 1855), Gabbon adder, syn. Echidna gabonica Duméril, Bibron & Duméril, 1854, Bitis rhinoceros, endemic
  - Bitis inornata (A. Smith, 1838), hornless adder, syn. Echidna inornata Smith, 1838, Clotho atropos Gray, 1849, Vipera inornata Strauch, 1869, Bitis cornuta inornata Underwood, 1968, Bitis (Calechidna) inornata Lenk et al., 1999, endemic
  - Bitis rubida Branch, 1997, red adder, syn. Bitis cornuta albanica Hewitt, 1937, Bitis inornata Fitzsimmons, 1946, Bitis cornuta inornata Underwood, 1968, Bitis cornuta cornuta Haacke, 1975, Bitis caudalis Visser, 1979, Bitis (Calechidna) rubida Lenk et al., 1999, endemic
  - Bitis schneideri (Boettger, 1886), Namaqua dwarf adder, syn. Vipera schneideri Boettger, 1886, Bitis caudalis paucisquamata Mertens, 1954, Bitis paucisquamata Mertens, 1954, Bitis (Calechidna) schneideri Lenk et al., 1999, endemic to southern Africa
  - Bitis xeropaga Haacke, 1975, desert mountain adder, syn. Bitis (Calechidna) xeropaga Lenk et al., 1999, endemic to South Africa and Namibia
- Genus Causus:
  - Causus defilippii (Jan, 1862), snouted night adder, Heterodon defilippi Jan, 1862
  - Causus rhombeatus (Lichtenstein, 1823), common night adder, syn. Sepedon rhombeata Lichtenstein, 1823

== Testudines ==
Order Testudines

=== Cheloniidae ===
Family Cheloniidae

- Genus Caretta:
  - Caretta caretta Linnaeus, 1758, loggerhead turtle, syn. Testudo caretta Linnaeus, 1758, Caouana elongata Gray, 1844, Caretta atra Merrem, 1820, Caretta gigas Deraniyagala, 1933, Caretta nasuta Rafinesque, 1814, Cephalochelys oceanica Gray, 1873, Chelonia caouana Duméril & Bibron, 1835, Chelonia caretta Dyce, 1861, Chelonia dubia Bleeker, 1889, Chelonia multiscutata Kuhl, 1820, Chelonia pelasgorum Bory, 1833, Chelonia polyaspis Bleeker, 1889, Testudo cephalo Schneider, 1783, Testudo corianna Gray, 1831, Thalassiochelys tarapacona Philippi, 1887, Thalassochelys caretta Boulenger, 1886, Thalassochelys cephalo Barbour & Cole, 1906, Thalassochelys controversa Philippi, 1899, Thalassochelys corticata Girand, 1858, Testudo marina Garsault, 1764, Testudo nasicornis Lacépède, 1788, Caouana elongata Gray, 1844, Thalassochelys cauana Boettger, 1880
- Genus Chelonia:
  - Chelonia mydas (Linnaeus, 1758), green turtle, syn. Chelonia mydas mydas (Linnaeus, 1758), Chelonia agassizii Bocourt, 1868, Testudo mydas Linnaeus, 1758, Chelonia mydas agassizii Bocourt, 1868
- Genus Eretmochelys:
  - Eretmochelys imbricata (Linnaeus, 1766), hawksbill turtle, syn. Chelone imbricata Boulenger, 1889, Chelonia imbricata Duméril, 1835, Chelonia radiata Cuvier, 1829, Testudo imbricata Linnaeus, 1766
    - [Eretmochelys imbricata bissa (Rüppell, 1835), hawksbill turtle, syn. Caretta bissa Rüppell 1835, Caretta rostrata Girard 1858, Caretta squamata Swinhoe 1863, Caretta squamosa Giraard 1858, Eretmochelys squamata Agassiz 1857, Eretmochelys squamosa Steineger 1907
    - Eretmochelys imbricata imbricata (Linnaeus, 1766), hawksbill turtle, syn. Chelonia pseudocaretta Lesson 1834, Chelonia pseudomydas Lesson 1834, Eretmochelys imbricata Conant 1991, Onychochelys kraussi Gray 1873
- Genus Lepidochelys:
  - Lepidochelys olivacea (Eschscholtz, 1829), olive Ridley turtle, syn. Caouana dessumierii Smith, 1849, Caouana olivacea Gray, 1844, Caouana rüppelli Gray, 1844, Caretta caretta olivacea Smith, 1931, Caretta olivacea Rüppell, 1835, Caretta remivaga Hay, 1908, Chelonia dussumierii Duméril, 1835, Chelonia olivacea Eschscholtz, 1829, Chelonia subcarinata Rüppell, 1844, Lepidochelys dussumierii Girard, 1858, Thalssochelys olivacea Strauch, 1862

=== Dermochelyidae ===
Family Dermochelyidae

- Genus Dermochelys:
  - Dermochelys coriacea (Vandelli, 1761), leatherback turtle, syn. Chelonia lutaria Rafinesque, 1814, Dermatochelys coriacea Günther, 1864, Dermatochelys porcata Wagler, 1830, Dermochelis atlantica, Lesueur, 1829, Sphargis angusta Philippi, 1899, Sphargis coriacea Gray, 1831, Sphargis coriacea schlegelii Garman, 1884, Sphargis mercurialis Merrem, 1820, Testudo arcuata Catesby, 1771, Testudo coriacea Vandelli, 1761, Testudo lyra Lacépède, 1788, Testudo tuberculata Pennant, 801
    - Dermochelys coriacea coriacea (Vandelli, 1761), leatherback turtle
    - Dermochelys coriacea schlegeli (Garman, 1884), leatherback turtle

=== Pelomedusidae ===
Family Pelomedusidae

- Genus Pelomedusa:
  - Pelomedusa subrufa Bonnaterre 1789, marsh terrapin, helmeted terrapin, syn. Testudo subrufa Lacépède, 1788, Emys olivacea Schweigger, 1812, Pelomedusa galeata Boulenger, 1889, Pelomedusa galeata damarensis Hewitt, 1935, Pelomedusa galeata devilliersi Hewitt, 1935, Pelomedusa galeata orangensis Hewitt, 1935, Pelomedusa galeata var. disjuncta Vaillant & Grandidier, 1910, Pelomedusa gasconi Rochebrune, 1884, Pelomedusa mossambicensis Peters (in Lichtenstein), 1856, Pelomedusa mozambica Peters (in Gray), 1855, Pelomedusa nigra Gray, 1863, Pelomedusa subrufa wettsteini Mertens, 1937, Pentonix americana Cornalia, 1849, Pentonyx capensis Duméril & Bibron, 1835, Pentonyx gehafie Rüppell, 1835, Testudo emys arabica Ehrenberg (in Stresemann), 1954, Testudo rubicunda Suckow, 1798
- Genus Pelusios:
  - Pelusios rhodesianus Hewitt, 1927, variable hinged terrapin, syn. Pelusios nigricans rhodesianus Hewitt, 1927, Pelusios castaneus rhodesianus Wermuth & Mertens, 1977, Pelusios rhodesianus Broadley, 1998
  - Pelusios sinuatus (A. Smith, 1838), serrated hinged terrapin, syn. Sternotherus sinuatus Smith, 1838, Sternotherus dentatus Peters, 1848, Sternothaerus sinuatus Boulenger, 1889, Sternothaerus bottegi Boulenger, 1895, Pelusios sinuatus zuluensis Hewitt, 1927, Pelusios sinuatus leptus Hewitt, 1933
  - Pelusios castanoides Hewitt, 1931, yellow-bellied hinged terrapin, syn. Pelusios nigricans castanoides Hewitt, 1931, Pelusios castaneus kapika Bour, 1978, Pelusios castaneus castanoides Hewitt, 1931
  - Pelusios subniger (Bonnaterre, 1789), Pan hinged terrapin

=== Testudinidae ===
Family Testudinidae

- Genus Chersina:
  - Chersina angulata (Schweigger, 1812), angulate tortoise, syn. Testudo angulata Schweigger, 1812, Goniochersus angulata Lindholm, 1929, Neotestudo angulata Hewitt, 1931, near endemic
- Genus Homopus:
  - Homopus areolatus (Thunberg, 1787) parrot-beaked dwarf tortoise, syn. Testudo areolata Thunberg, 1787, Testudo miniata Lacépède, 1788, Testudo fasciata Daudin, 1802, Testudo africana Hermann, 1804, Chersine tetradactyla Merrem, 1820, Testudo areolata pallida Gray, 1831, endemic
  - Homopus boulengeri Duerden, 1906, Karoo dwarf tortoise, endemic
  - Homopus femoralis Boulenger, 1888, greater dwarf tortoise, endemic
  - Homopus signatus (Gmelin, 1789), speckled dwarf tortoise, speckled padloper, syn. Testudo signata Walbaum, 1782, Pseudomopus signatus peersi Hewitt, 1935, Testudo cafra Daudin, 1802, Testudo juvencella Daudin, 1831, endemic
- Genus Kinixys:
  - Kinixys belliana Gray, 1831, Bell's hinge-back tortoise, syn. Cinixys belliana Duméril & Bibron, 1835, Cinixys dorri Lataste, 1888, Homopus darlingi Boulenger, 1902, Kinixys australis Hewitt, 1931, Kinixys australis mababiensis Fitzsimons, 1932, Kinixys belliana domerguei (Vuillemin, 1972), Kinixys jordani Hewitt, 1931, Kinixys natalensis Hewitt, 1935, Kinixys schoensis Rüppell, 1845, Kinixys youngi Hewitt, 1931, Madakinixys domerguei Vuillemin, 1972, Kinixys belliana belliana (Gray, 1831), Kinixys belliana zuluensis Hewitt, 1931, Kinixys belliana domerguei (Vuillemin, 1972), Madakinixys domerguei Vuillemin, 1972, Kinixys belliana mertensi Laurent, 1956, Kinixys belliana nogueyi (Lataste, 1886), Homopus nogueyi Lataste, 1886, Cinixys dorri Lataste, 1888, Kinixys belliana zombensis Hewitt, 1931
    - Kinixys belliana mertensi Laurent, 1956, Bell's hinge-back tortoise, syn. Cinixys belliana Duméril & Bibron, 1835, endemic
    - Kinixys belliana belliana Gray, 1831, Bell's hinge-back tortoise, syn. Cinixys belliana Duméril & Bibron, 1835, Homopus darlingi Boulenger 1902, Kinixys australis Hewitt 1931, Kinixys australis mababiensis Fitzsimons 1932, Kinixys belliana zuluensis Hewitt 1931, Kinixys jordani Hewitt 1931, Kinixys natalensis Hewitt, 1935, Kinixys schoensis Rüppell 1845, Kinixys youngi Hewitt 1931
  - Kinixys lobatsiana Power, 1927, Lobatse hinge-back tortoise, syn. Kinixys belliana lobatsiana Auerbach, 1987, Cinixys lobatsiana Power 1927, near endemic
  - Kinixys natalensis Hewitt, 1935 Natal hinge-back tortoise, syn. Kinixys belliana natalensis Obst, 1986, near endemic
  - Kinixys spekii Gray, 1863 Speke's hinge-back tortoise, syn. Testudo procterae Loveridge, 1923, Kinixys belliana Wermuth & Mertens, 1977
  - Kinixys zombensis Hewitt, 1931 eastern hinged-back tortoise, syn. Cinixys belliana Duméril & Bibron, 1835
- Genus Psammobates:
  - Psammobates geometricus (Linnaeus, 1758) geometric tortoise, syn. Testudo geometrica Linnaeus, 1758, Testudo luteola Daudin, 1802, Testudo geometrica Duméril & Bibron, 1835, Peltastes geographicus Gray, 1869, Testudo strauchi Lidth De Jeude, 1893, endemic
  - Psammobates oculifer (Kuhl, 1820) serrated tortoise, syn. Testudo oculifera Kuhl, 1820, Testudo semiserrata Smith, 1840, Testudo semi-serrata Duméril & Bibron, 1854, Psammobates oculiferus King & Burke, 1989, endemic
  - Psammobates pardalis Bell, 1828 leopard tortoise, syn. Geochelone (Centrochelys) pardalis Bour, 1980, Geochelone pardalis babcocki Auerbach, 1987, Geochelone pardalis Vinke & Vinke, 2005, Psammobates pardalis babcocki (Loveridge, 1935), Psammobates pardalis Le et al., 2006, Psammobates pardalis pardalis (Bell, 1828), Testudo biguttata Cuvier, 1829, Testudo bipunctata Gray, 1831, Testudo pardalis babcocki Loveridge, 1935, Testudo pardalis Bell, 1828, Testudo pardalis pardalis Loveridge, 1935, Stigmochelys pardalis babcocki Loveridge, 1935, Stigmochelys pardalis pardalis Boue, 2002, Testudo armata Gray, 1831, Stigmochelys pardalis (Bell, 1828), endemic
  - Psammobates tentorius (Bell, 1828), tent tortoise, syn. Chersinella fiski colesbergensis Hewitt, 1934, Chersinella fiski cronwrighti Hewitt, 1934, Chersinella fiski grica Hewitt, 1934, Chersinella fiski gricoides Hewitt, 1934, Chersinella fiski orangensis Hewitt, 1934, Chersinella schonlandi Hewitt, 1934, Chersinella tentoria albanica Hewitt, 1933, Chersinella tentoria duerdeni Hewitt, 1933, Chersinella tentoria Hewitt, 1933, Chersinella tentoria karuella Hewitt, 1933, Chersinella tentoria karuica Hewitt, 1933, Chersinella tentoria lativittata Hewitt, 1933, Chersinella tentoria piscatella Hewitt, 1933, Chersinella tentoria subsulcata Hewitt, 1933, Chersinella tentoria tentorioides Hewitt, 1933, Chersinella verroxii amasensis Hewitt, 1934, Chersinella verroxii bergeri Hewitt, 1934, Homopus bergeri Lindholm, 1906, Homopus verreauxii Boulenger, 1889, Peltastes verreauxii Gray, 1870, Psammobates depressa Fitzsimons, 1938, Psammobates tentorius verroxii (Smith, 1839), Testudo bergeri Siebenrock, 1909, Testudo boettgeri Siebenrock, 1909, Testudo fiski Boulenger, 1886, Testudo oscar-boettgeri Lindholm, 1929, Testudo seimundi Boulenger, 1903, Testudo smithi bergeri Mertens & Wermuth, 1955, Testudo smithi Boulenger, 1886, Testudo tentoria Bell, 1828, Testudo tentorius verroxii Smith, 1839, Testudo trimeni Boulenger, 1886, Testudo verreauxii Boulenger, 1889, Testudo verroxii bergeri Mertens, 1955, Testudo verroxii Smith, 1839, Chersinella tentoria hexensis Hewitt, 1933, Psammobates tentorius Fritz & Bininda-Emonds, 2007, Psammobates tentorius tentorius (Bell, 1828), Psammobates tentorius trimeni (Boulenger, 1886), Testudo geometrica nigriventris Gray, 1855, endemic
