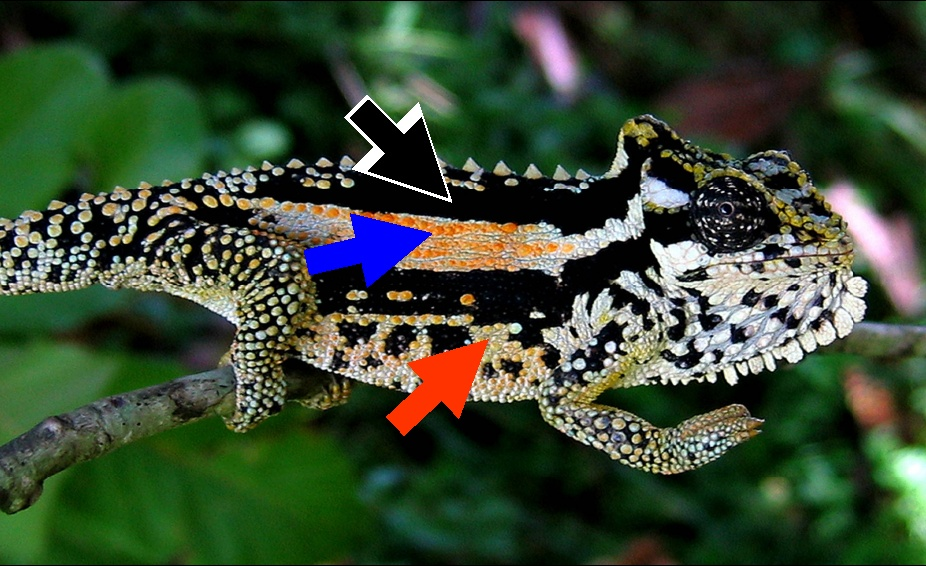

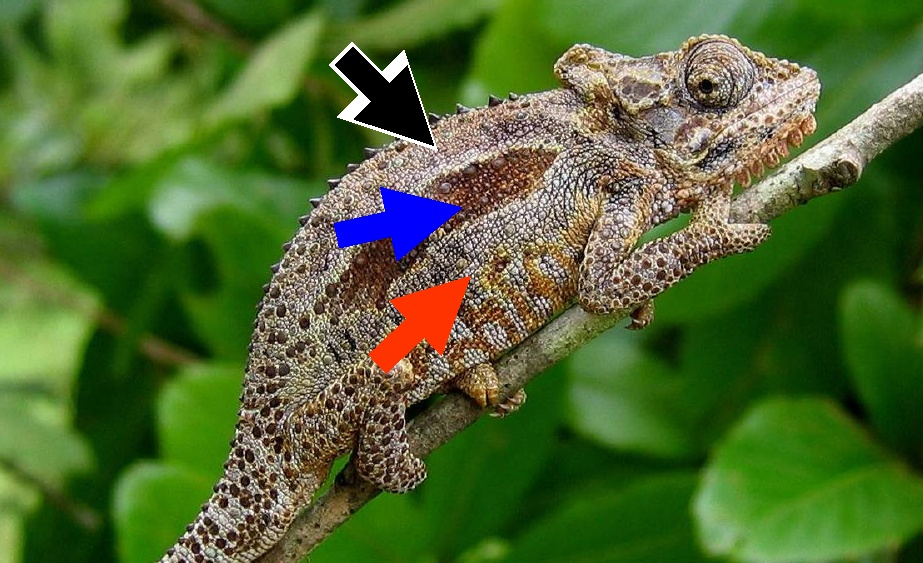
- Male in dominant (above) and submissive coloration (below)

Conservation status
- Least Concern (IUCN 3.1)
- CITES Appendix II (CITES)

Scientific classification
- Domain: Eukaryota
- Kingdom: Animalia
- Phylum: Chordata
- Class: Reptilia
- Order: Squamata
- Suborder: Iguania
- Family: Chamaeleonidae
- Genus: Bradypodion
- Species: B. transvaalense

Binomial name
- Bradypodion transvaalense (FitzSimons 1930)
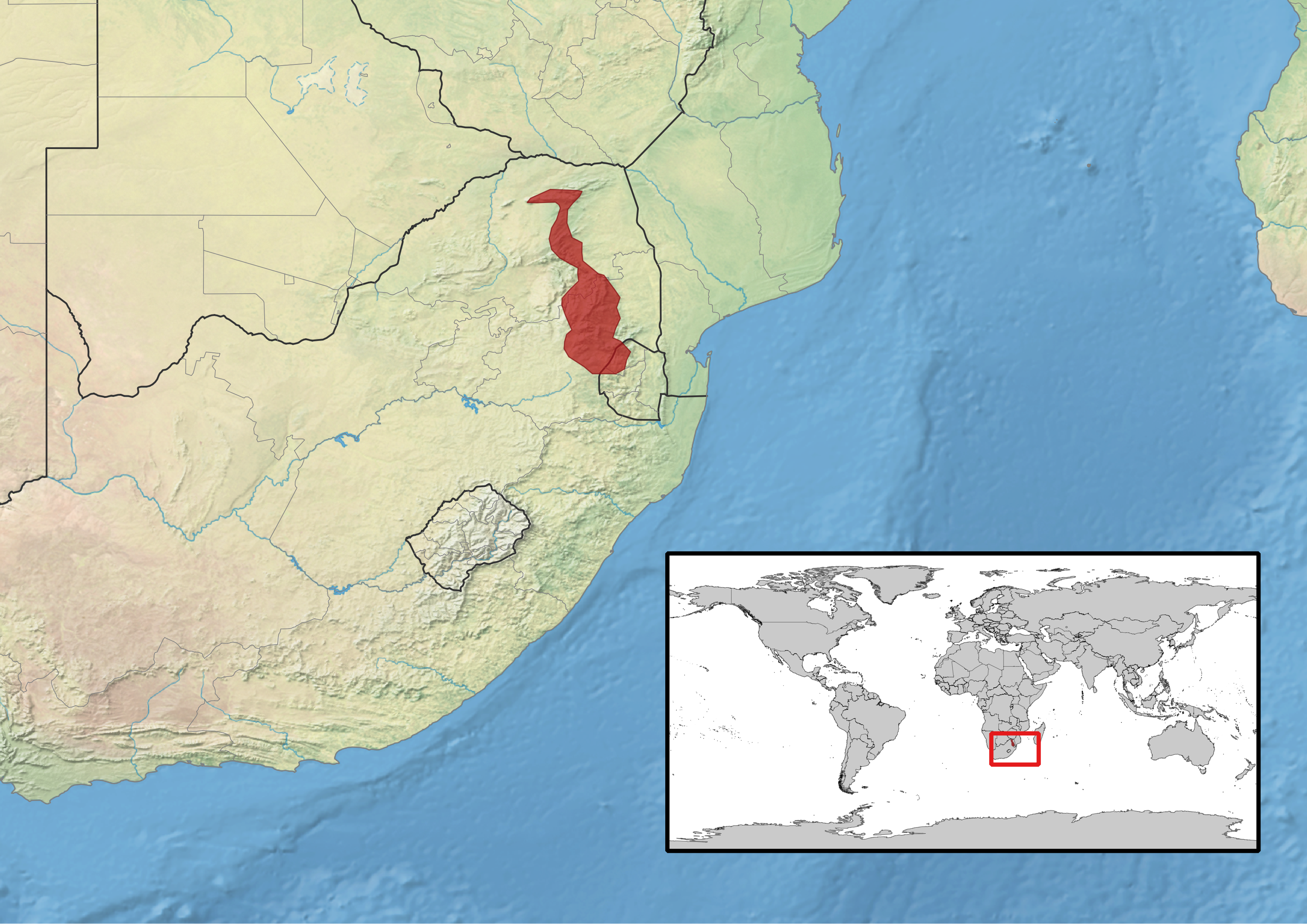

= Transvaal dwarf chameleon =

Species of lizard

The Transvaal dwarf chameleon (Bradypodion transvaalense) is a chameleon native to South Africa, where it is found in forested areas of Mpumalanga and Limpopo provinces. It is also known as the Wolkberg dwarf chameleon, after the Wolkberg range.

== Description ==
They can be distinguished from their relatives in the genus by their bright colouration, with reds and oranges. They are highly territorial and relatively aggressive towards one another.

== Varieties and relatives ==
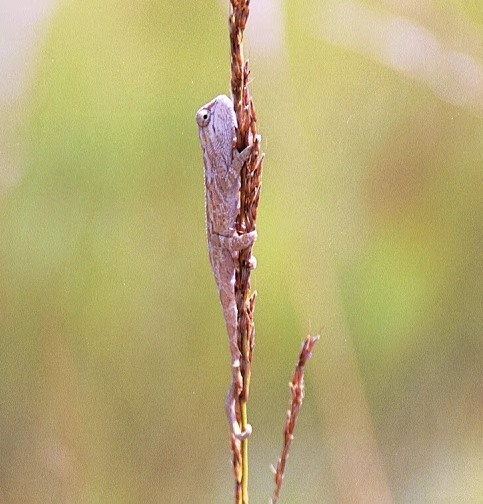
Sekhukhune dwarf chameleon

In 2003, an ecological impact study near the village of Roossenekal, conducted by BSc Honours students (Centre for Wildlife Management at University of Pretoria) found a new variety of this dwarf chameleon. DNA research from samples collected by R.P. Zoer at the Transvaal Museum (Pretoria) revealed that it is a new variety from the Sekhukhuneland region (Bradypodion transvaalense var. sekhukhunii). A related species found in Ngome Forest, KwaZulu-Natal, is known as the Ngome dwarf chameleon (B. ngomeense).
