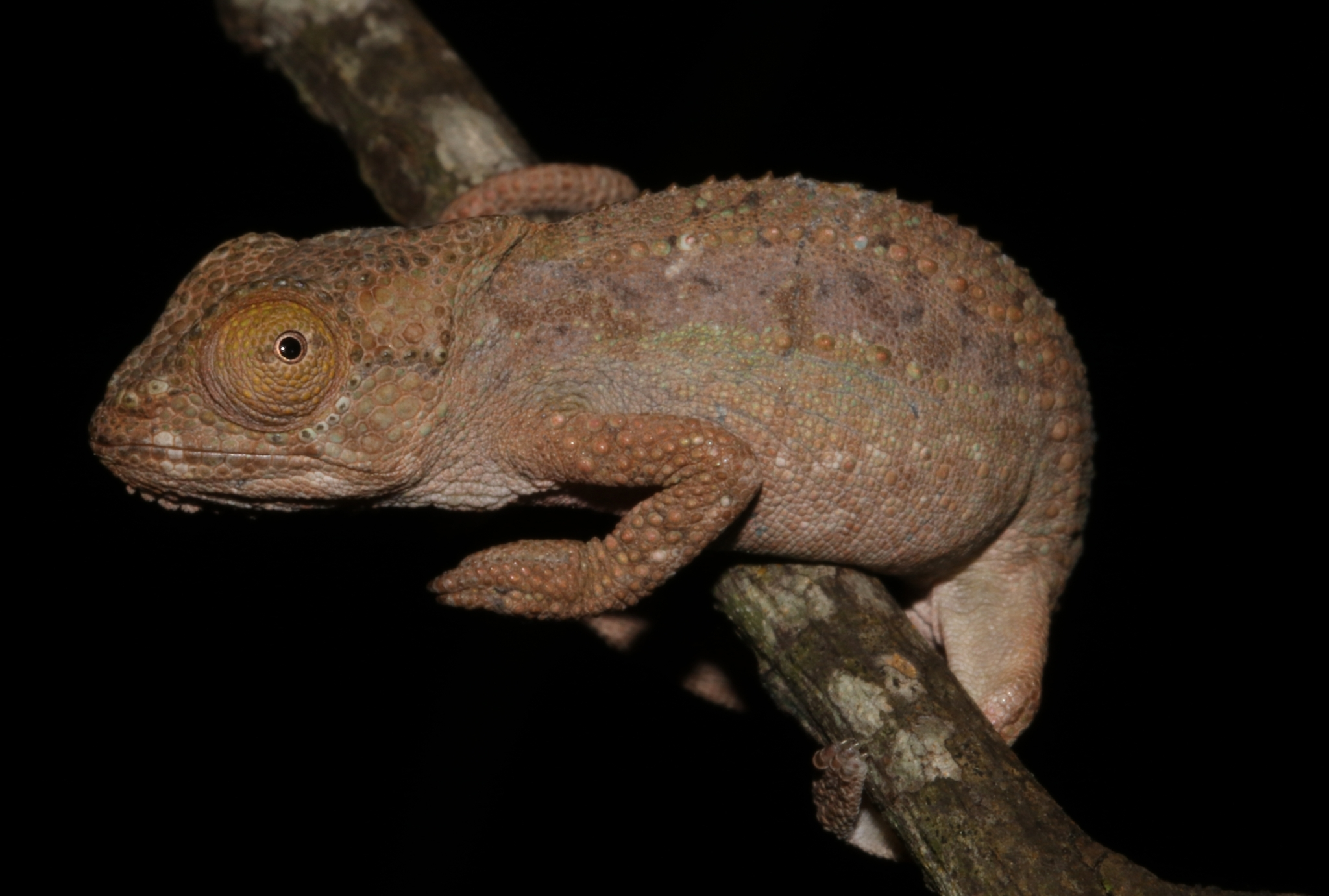

Conservation status
- Vulnerable (IUCN 3.1)

Scientific classification
- Kingdom: Animalia
- Phylum: Chordata
- Class: Reptilia
- Order: Squamata
- Suborder: Iguania
- Family: Chamaeleonidae
- Genus: Bradypodion
- Species: B. venustum

Binomial name
- Bradypodion venustum Tolley, Tilbury, & M Burger, 2022

= Bradypodion venustum =

Species of lizard

Bradypodion venustum, the Grootvadersbosch dwarf chameleon, is endemic to the Boosmansbos Wilderness area in South Africa.

== Conservation status ==
The Grootvadersbosch dwarf chameleon is classified as vulnerable due to its restricted range of 8km^{2} at a single location in the Grootvadersbosch forest of the Langeberg Mountains.
