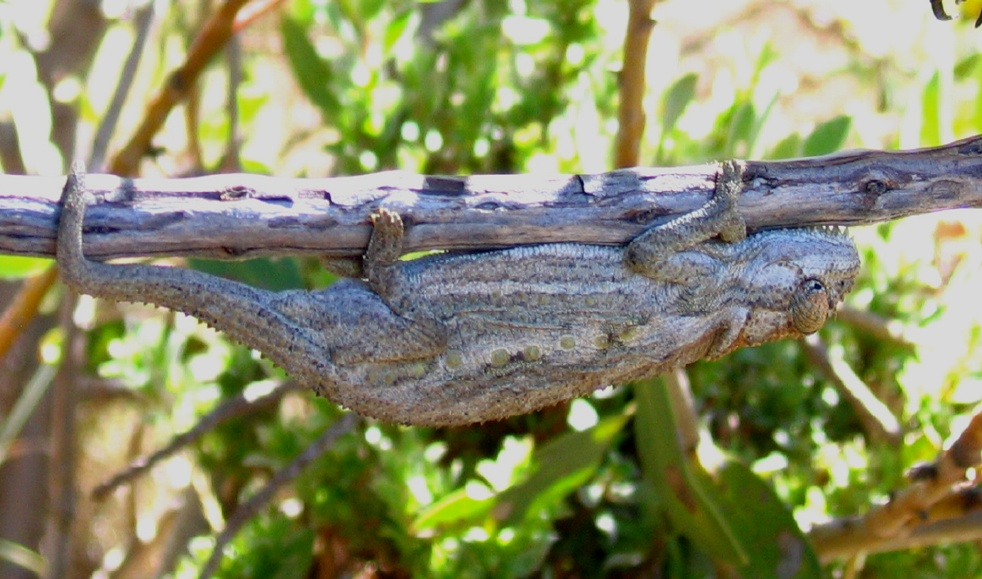

Conservation status
- Least Concern (IUCN 3.1)
- CITES Appendix II

Scientific classification
- Kingdom: Animalia
- Phylum: Chordata
- Class: Reptilia
- Order: Squamata
- Suborder: Iguania
- Family: Chamaeleonidae
- Genus: Bradypodion
- Species: B. atromontanum

Binomial name
- Bradypodion atromontanum Branch, Tolley, & Tilbury, 2006
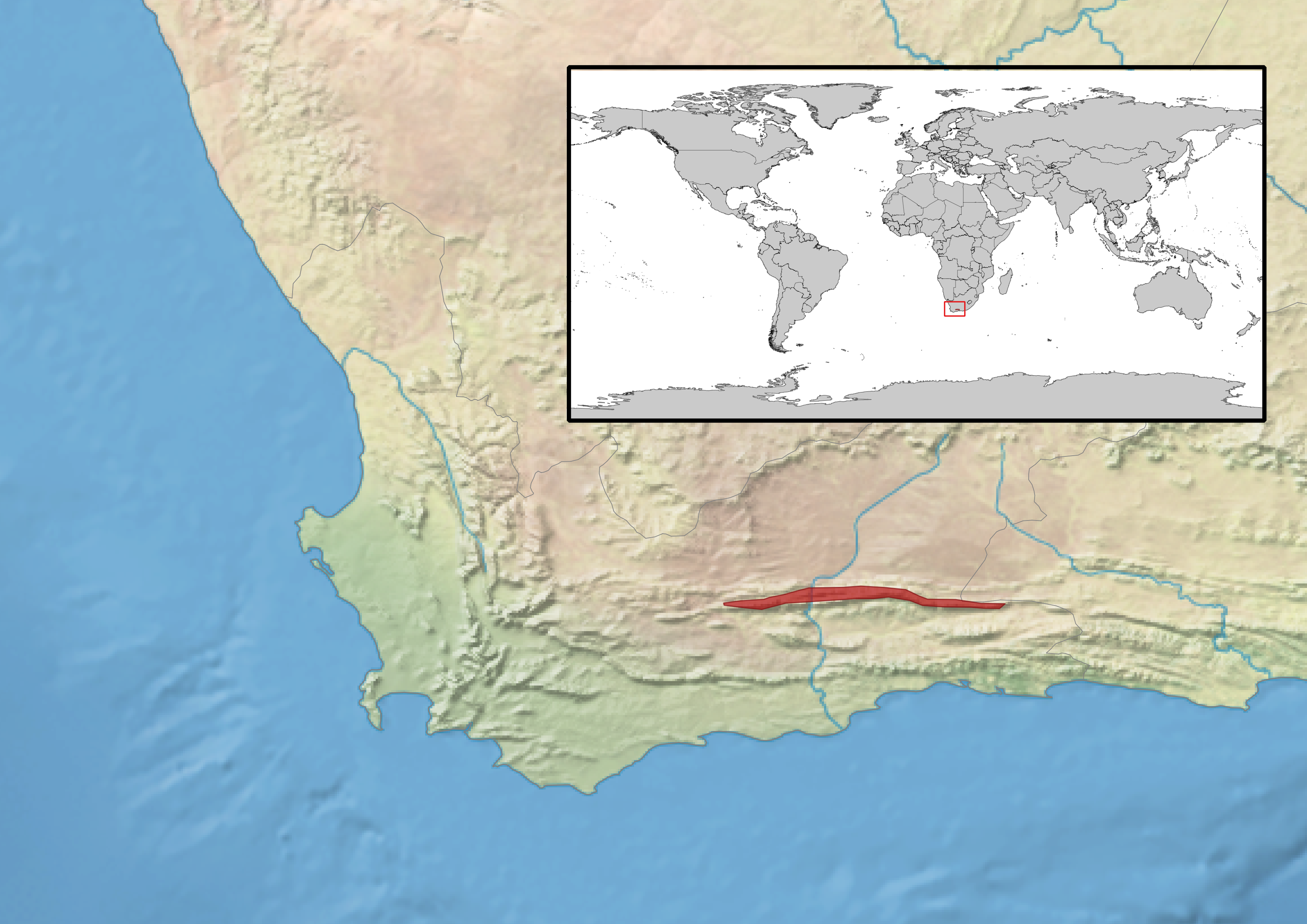

= Swartberg dwarf chameleon =

Species of lizard

The Swartberg dwarf chameleon (Bradypodion atromontanum) is a species of chameleon endemic to South Africa.

== Taxonomy ==
For many years a dwarf chameleon of undetermined taxonomic status was known from the Swartberg area. A subsequent phylogenetic study resulted in its description as a new species. Morphologically it can be confused with B. gutturale but the two species are allopatric.

== Description ==
It is a small chameleon not exceeding 12 cm. It is usually a pale yellow/brown with greenish hues.

== Distribution ==
It is endemic to the Swartberg mountains, Western Cape, South Africa. It occurs in the Swartberg Nature Reserve. It is also found at Groot Swartberg.

== Habitat ==
Swartberg dwarf chameleon is arboreal and inhabits mountain fynbos habitat.
