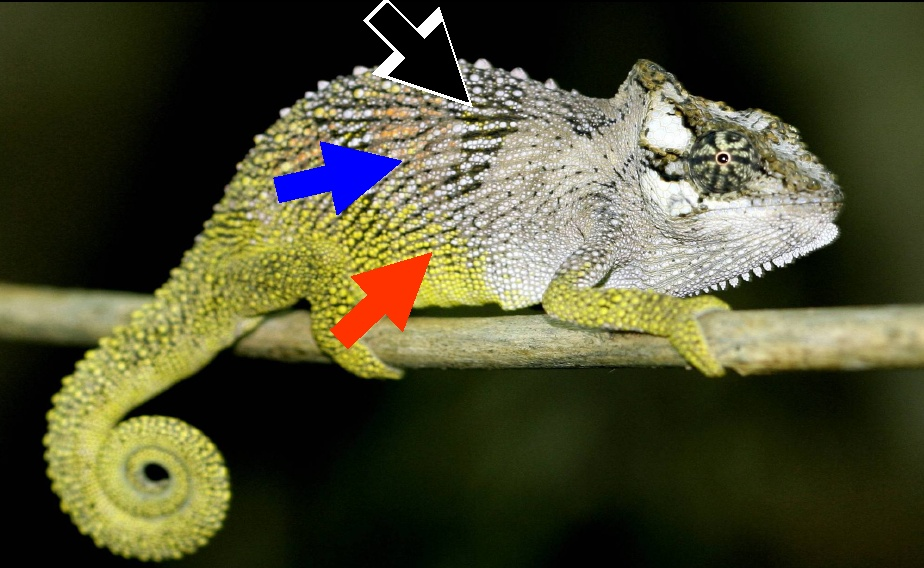
- Male Transkei dwarf chameleon, dominant coloration

Conservation status
- Endangered (IUCN 3.1)
- CITES Appendix II (CITES)

Scientific classification
- Kingdom: Animalia
- Phylum: Chordata
- Class: Reptilia
- Order: Squamata
- Suborder: Iguania
- Family: Chamaeleonidae
- Genus: Bradypodion
- Species: B. caffrum

Binomial name
- Bradypodion caffrum (Boettger, 1889)
- Transkei dwarf chameleon range Extant (resident)

Synonyms
- Chamaeleon caffer Boettger, 1889; Bradypodion caffrum (Boettger, 1889) (orthographic error)

= Transkei dwarf chameleon =

Species of lizard

The Transkei dwarf chameleon or Pondo dwarf chameleon (Bradypodion caffer) is a chameleon endemic to the Eastern Cape Province of South Africa.

== Reproduction ==
Transkei dwarf chameleon are ovoviviparous.

== Habitat and conservation ==
Transkei dwarf chameleon inhabit low coastal forests. This habitat is deteriorating because of overgrazing by domestic livestock, clearing of land for agriculture, fuel-wood collection, invasion by introduced plants, and urbanization. The species occurs in the Silaka Nature Reserve, but is not known from other protected areas.

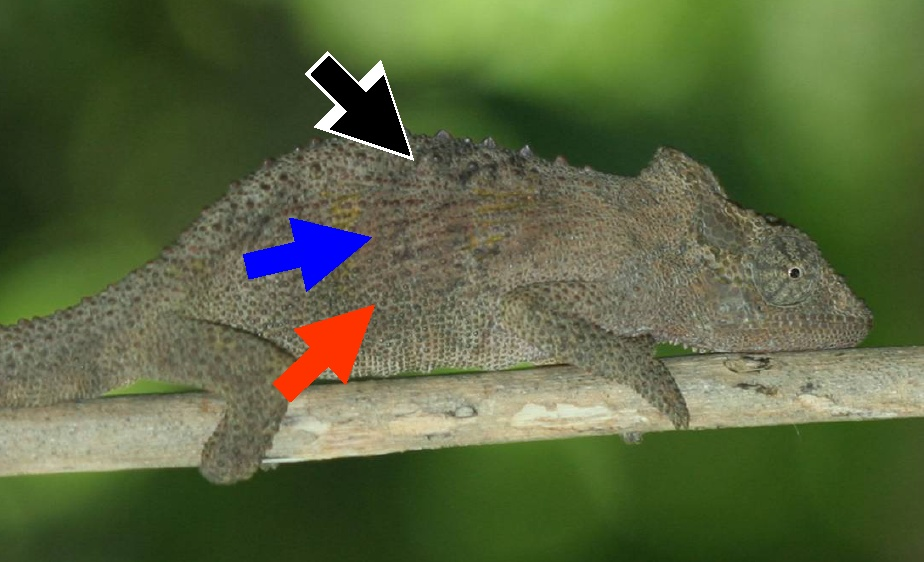
Male Transkei dwarf chameleon, submissive coloration
