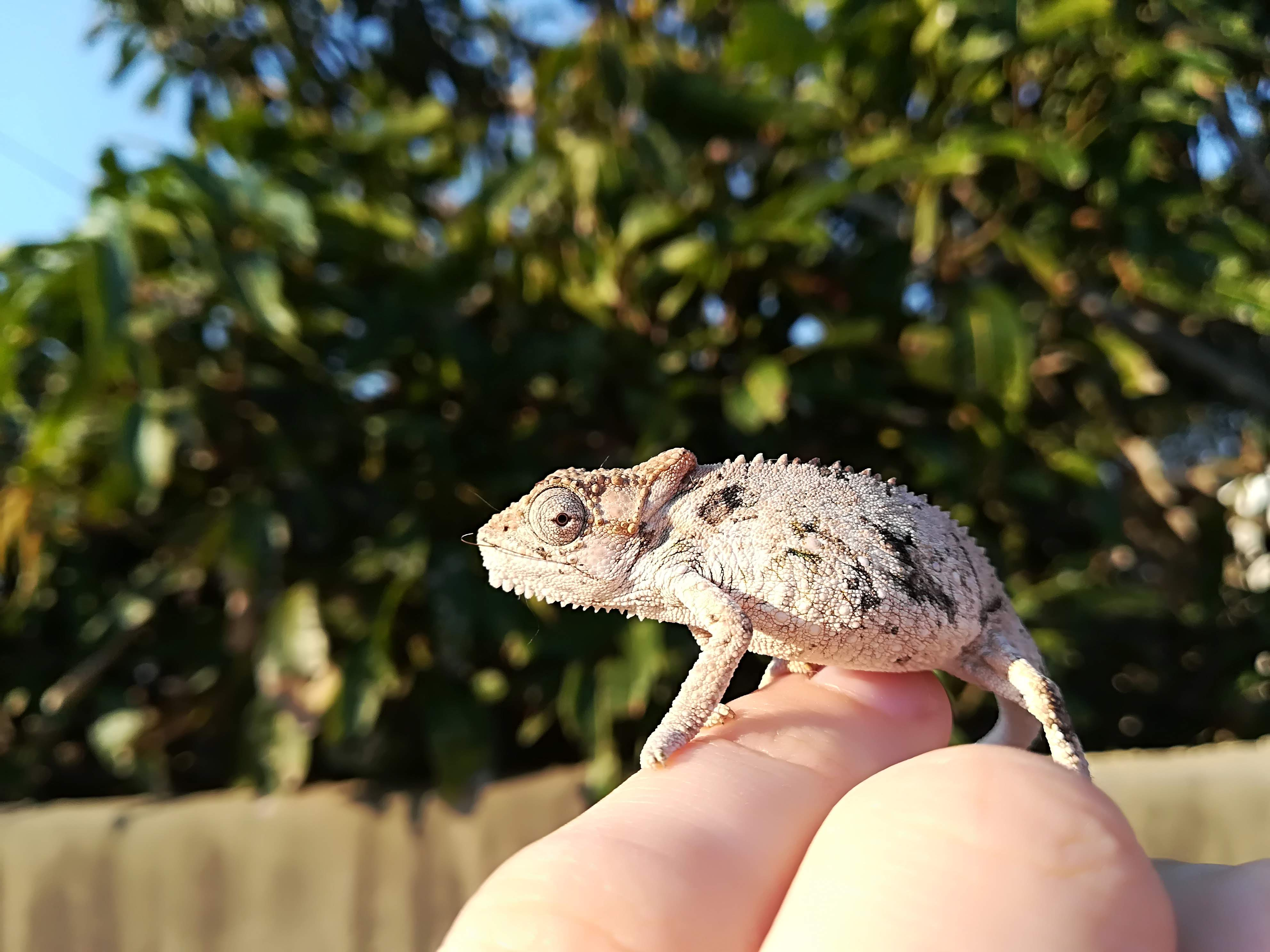
- White, grey and brown Southern dwarf chameleon found in Port Elizabeth, Eastern Cape, South Africa

Conservation status
- Least Concern (IUCN 3.1)
- CITES Appendix II

Scientific classification
- Kingdom: Animalia
- Phylum: Chordata
- Class: Reptilia
- Order: Squamata
- Suborder: Iguania
- Family: Chamaeleonidae
- Genus: Bradypodion
- Species: B. ventrale

Binomial name
- Bradypodion ventrale (JE Gray, 1845)
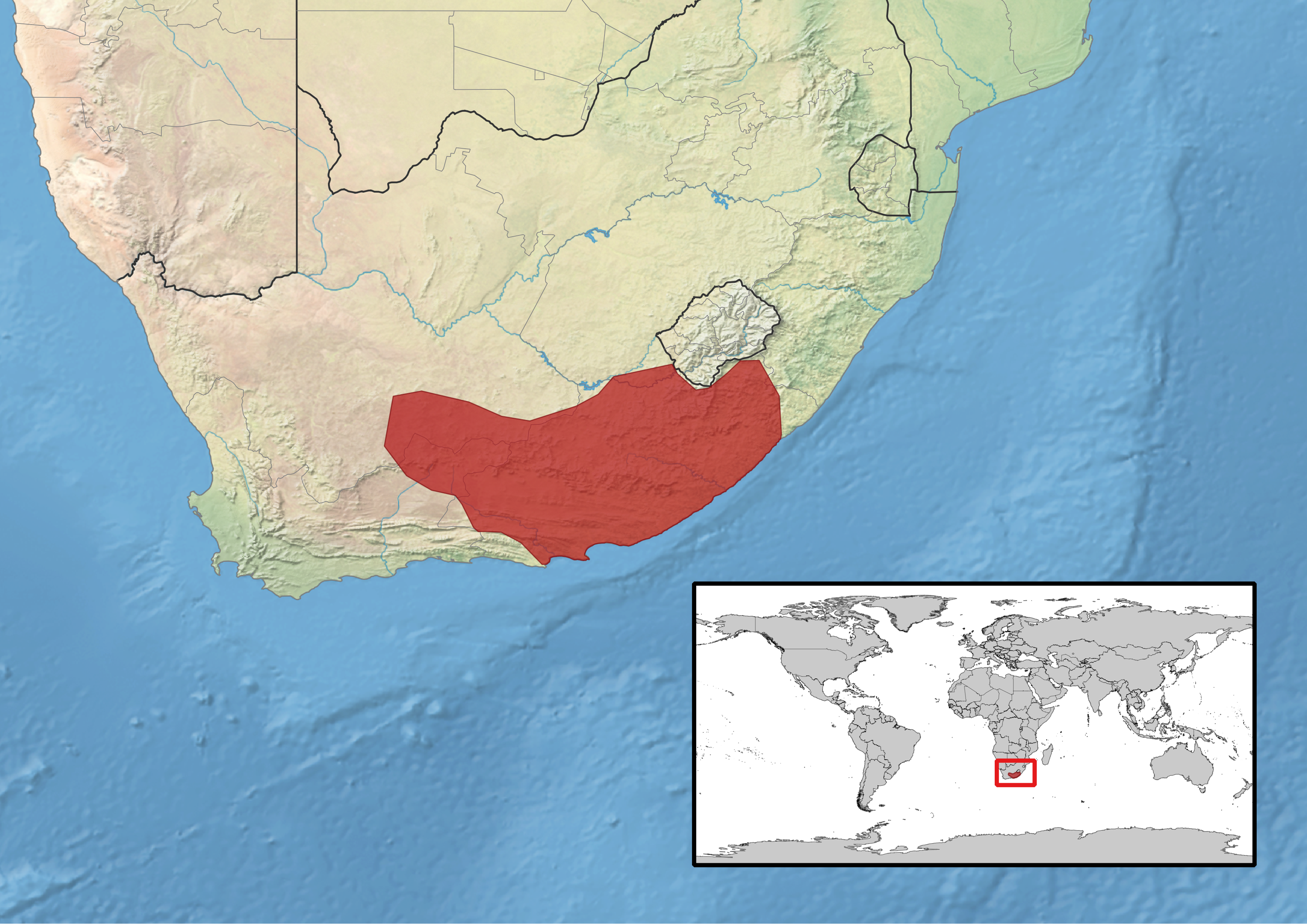

Synonyms
- Chamaeleo ventralis Gray, 1845; Bradypodion karrooicum Branch 1998

= Bradypodion ventrale =

Species of lizard

Bradypodion ventrale, the southern dwarf chameleon, occurs in the Eastern Cape, South Africa. It is also known as the eastern Cape dwarf chameleon. It is a relatively large species of dwarf chameleon, reaching lengths of 14 cm (5.5 in). It has a very prominent casque on the back of its head and a long, beard-like throat crest. It lives in dense thickets and shrub, and is usually very difficult to spot because of its colouring. It adapts very well to living in suburban gardens, but domestic cats – being introduced predators – will usually kill all chameleons in the immediate area. Consequently, one should not bring chameleons into a garden which is frequented by cats. It gives birth to litters of between 10 and 20 babies in the summer.
