= Ngome Forest =

Coordinates: 27°50′00″S 31°25′00″E

Ngome Forest is situated to the east of Vryheid, KwaZulu-Natal, South Africa. This is a unique forest, being transitional between Mistbelt Forest and Coastal Scarp Forest. The area has been protected since 1905, and forms part of the Ntendeka Wilderness Area.

Trees here grow up to 30m tall and include yellowwoods (Afrocarpus falcatus and Podocarpus latifolius), Natal hard pear (Olinia radiata), forest waterberry (Syzygium gerrardi), bastard stinkwood (Ocotea kenyensis), Terblanz beech (Faurea macnaughtonii) and green hazel (Trichocladus grandiflorus).

A species of dwarf chameleon (Bradypodion sp.) lives here known as the Ngome dwarf chameleon.

A survey of ground‐living spiders was conducted over a one‐year period at Ngome State Forest. Five different habitat types, namely grass, open forest, dense forest, ecotone and pine, were sampled with 180 pitfall traps. The grass, open forest and dense forest represented indigenous vegetation while the pine represented exotic vegetation. The ecotone consisted of a mixture of indigenous forest plants and pine trees. Pine had the lowest spider diversity while grass had the highest spider diversity. However, variation in spider diversity within habitat types was considerable and an analysis of variance found no significant difference in mean values of spider diversity between habitat types. Consequently, the results do not unambiguously support the hypothesis that exotic vegetation has lower ground‐living spider diversity than indigenous vegetation.

== See also ==
- Forests of KwaZulu-Natal
