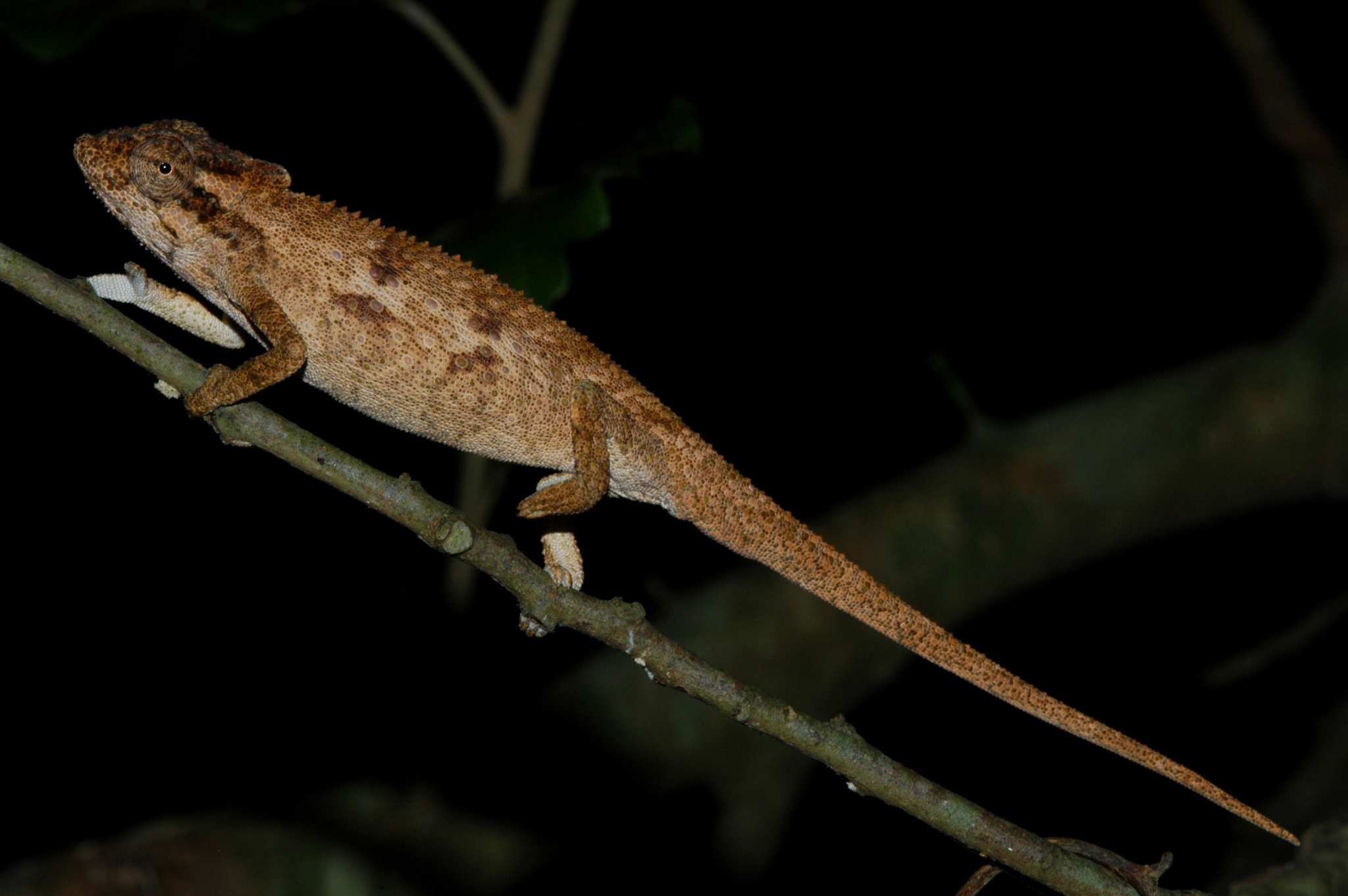

Conservation status
- Endangered (IUCN 3.1)
- CITES Appendix II (CITES)

Scientific classification
- Kingdom: Animalia
- Phylum: Chordata
- Class: Reptilia
- Order: Squamata
- Suborder: Iguania
- Family: Chamaeleonidae
- Genus: Bradypodion
- Species: B. kentanicum

Binomial name
- Bradypodion kentanicum (Hewitt, 1935)
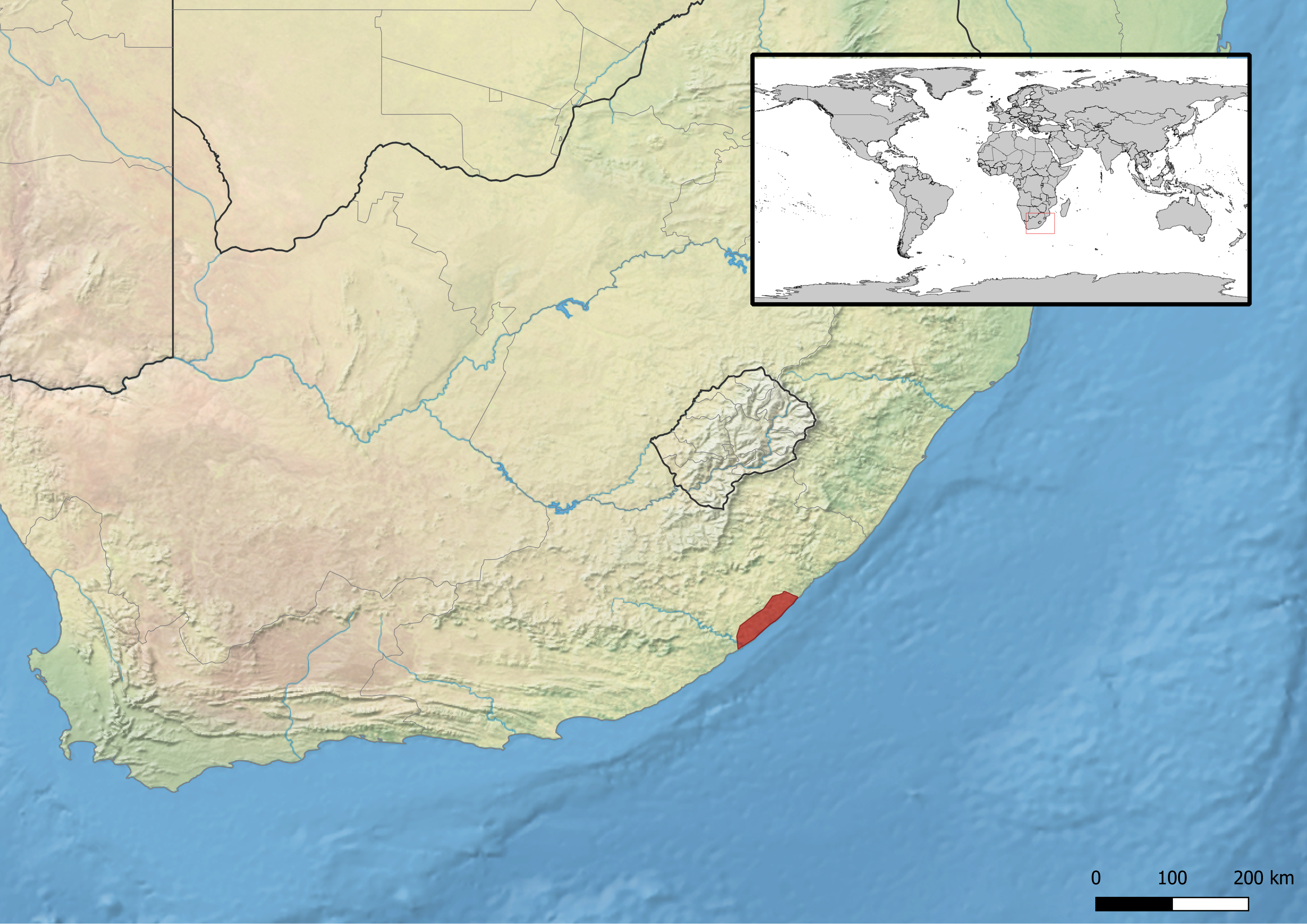

= Kentani dwarf chameleon =

Species of lizard

The Kentani dwarf chameleon (Bradypodion kentanicum) occurs in coastal area of the Eastern Cape, South Africa.
