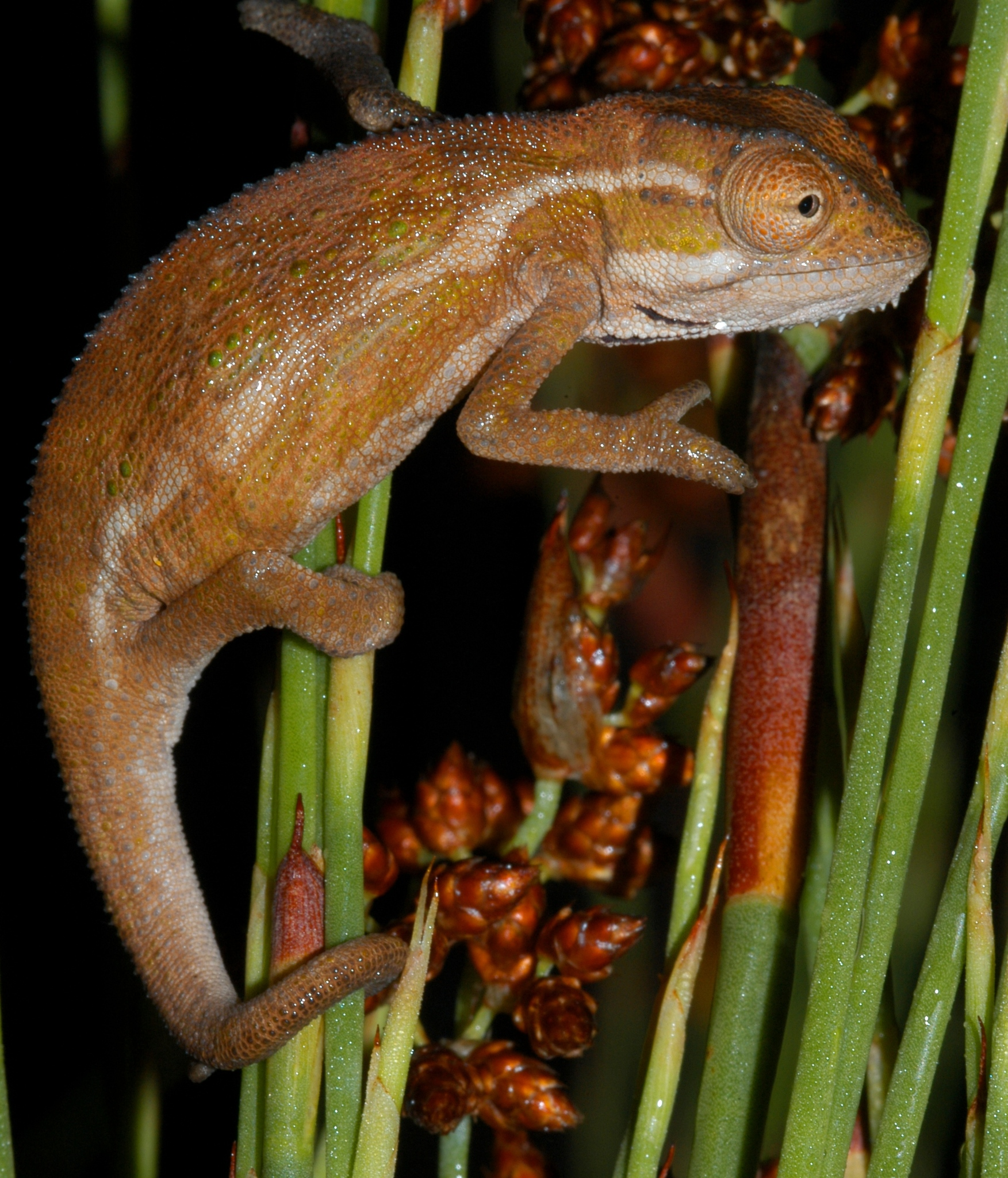

Conservation status
- Least Concern (IUCN 3.1)
- CITES Appendix II

Scientific classification
- Kingdom: Animalia
- Phylum: Chordata
- Class: Reptilia
- Order: Squamata
- Suborder: Iguania
- Family: Chamaeleonidae
- Genus: Bradypodion
- Species: B. taeniabronchum

Binomial name
- Bradypodion taeniabronchum Smith, 1831
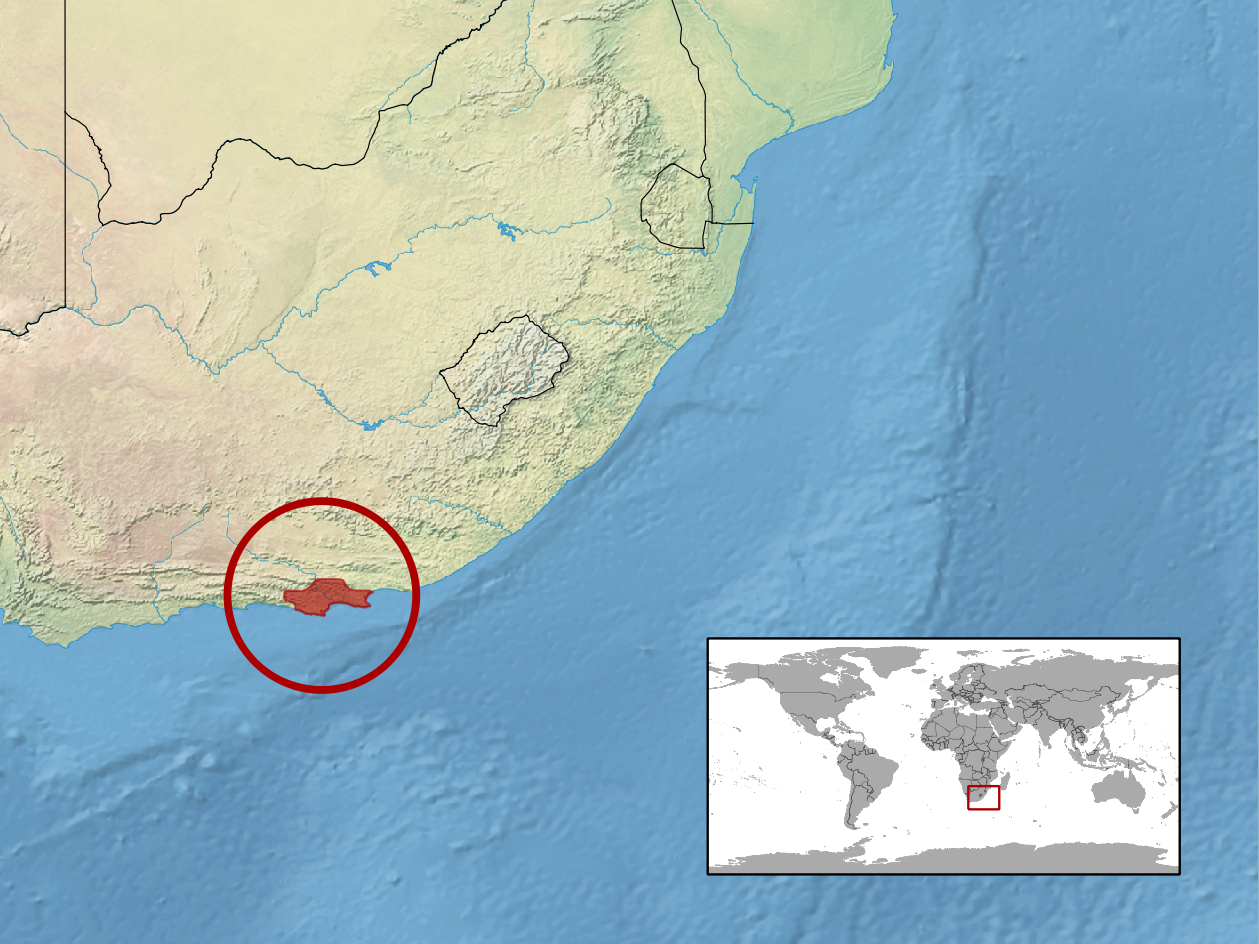

Synonyms
- Bradypodion pumilum taeniabronchum (Smith, 1831)

= Smith's dwarf chameleon =

Species of lizard

Smith's dwarf chameleon (Bradypodion taeniabronchum), also known as the Elandsberg dwarf chameleon, is a species of lizard in the family Chamaeleonidae endemic to Fynbos in South Africa's Eastern Cape. As in several species of chameleons in the genus Bradypodion, the Smith's dwarf chameleon can use its color-changing ability to actively camouflage itself depending on the vision of the specific predator species (for example, bird or snake) by which it is being threatened.
