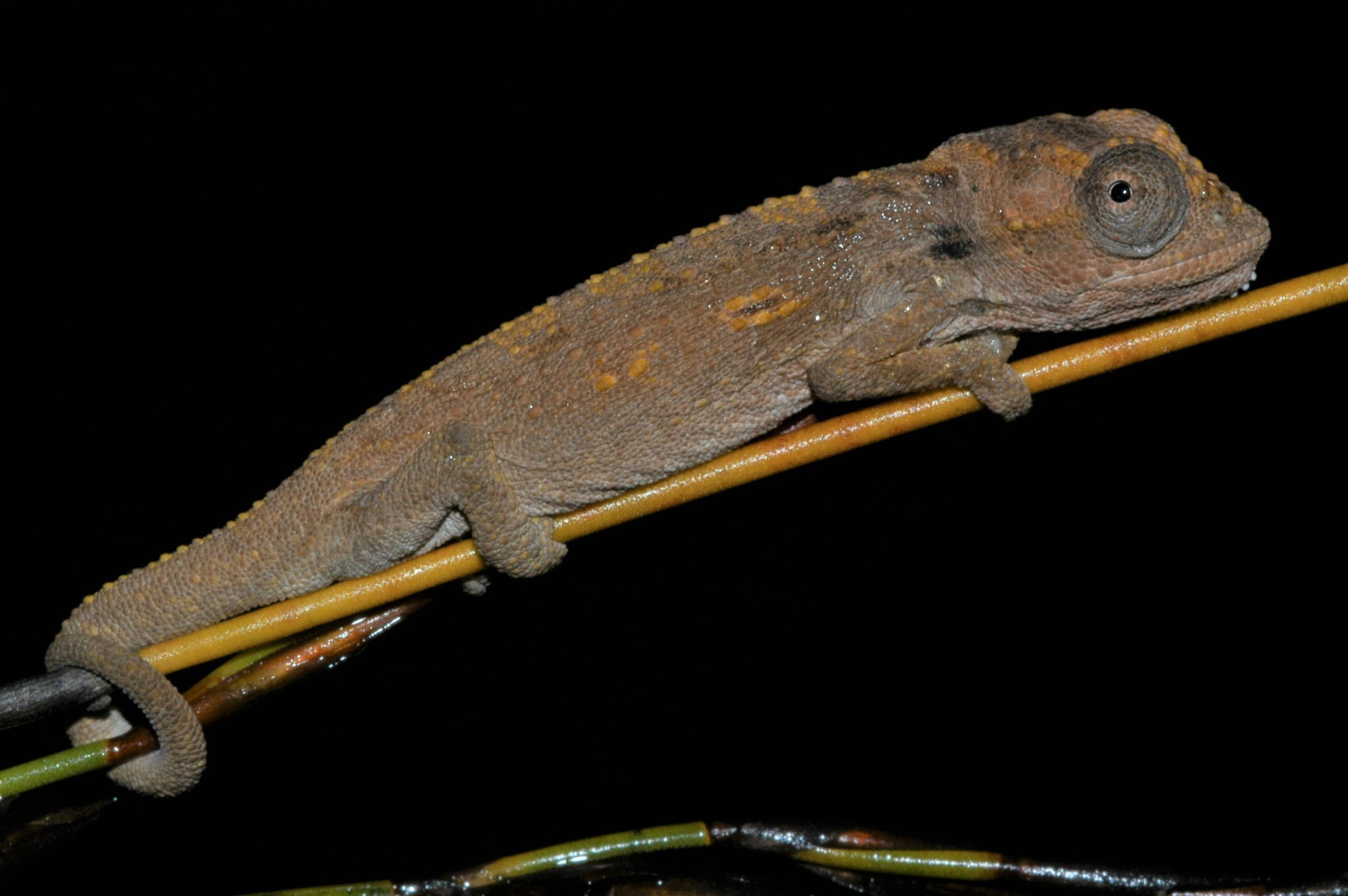

Scientific classification
- Kingdom: Animalia
- Phylum: Chordata
- Class: Reptilia
- Order: Squamata
- Suborder: Iguania
- Family: Chamaeleonidae
- Genus: Bradypodion
- Species: B. baviaanense

Binomial name
- Bradypodion baviaanense Tolley, Tilbury, & M Burger, 2022

= Bradypodion baviaanense =

Species of lizard

Bradypodion baviaanense is endemic to South Africa.
