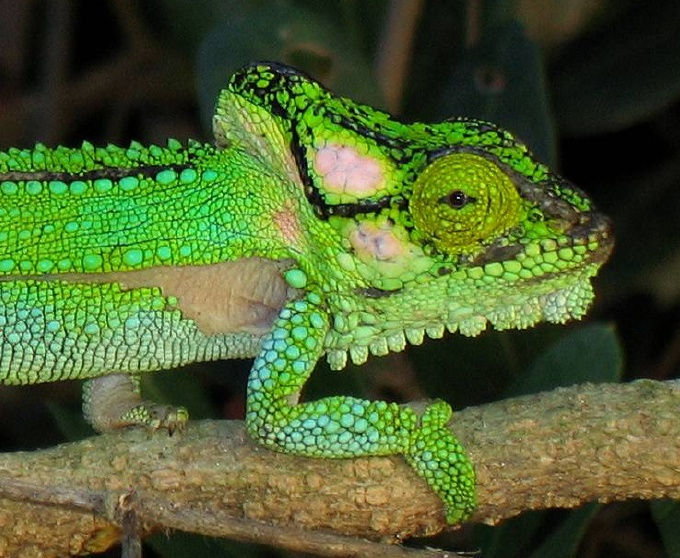

Conservation status
- Least Concern (IUCN 3.1)
- CITES Appendix II

Scientific classification
- Kingdom: Animalia
- Phylum: Chordata
- Class: Reptilia
- Order: Squamata
- Suborder: Iguania
- Family: Chamaeleonidae
- Genus: Bradypodion
- Species: B. damaranum

Binomial name
- Bradypodion damaranum (Boulenger, 1887)
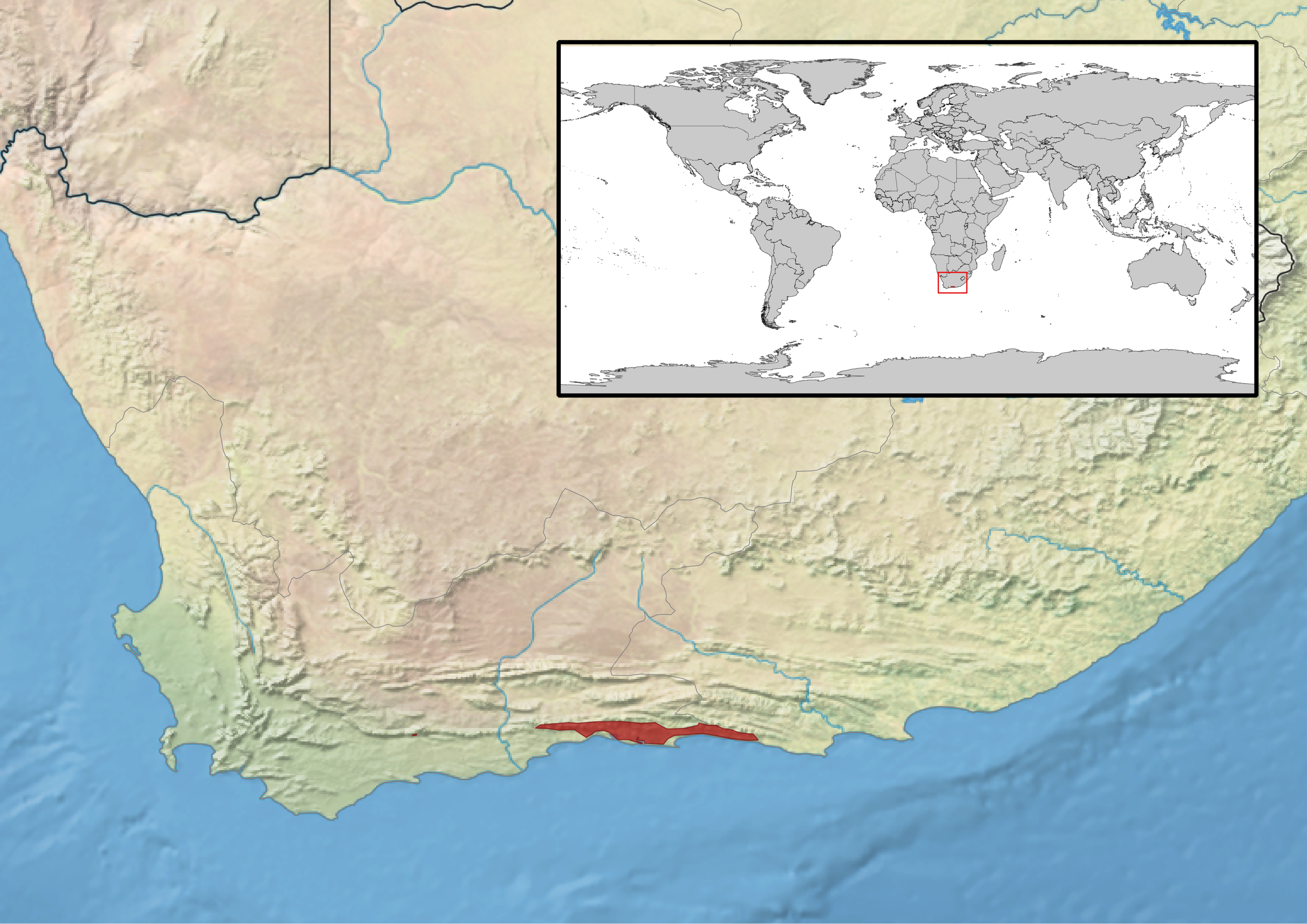

= Knysna dwarf chameleon =

Species of lizard

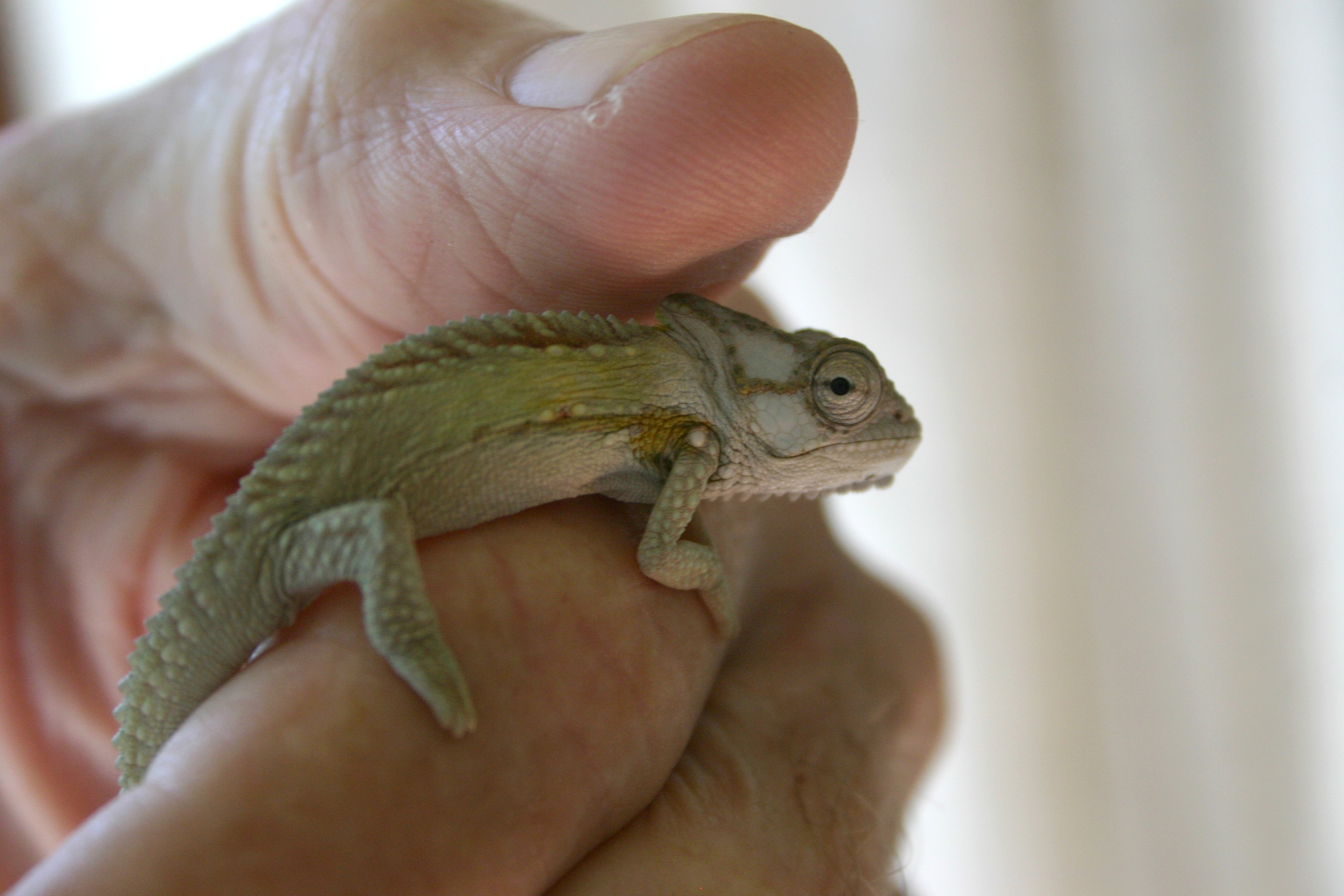
Knysna dwarf chameleon in a human hand

The Knysna dwarf chameleon (Bradypodion damaranum) is a species of dwarf chameleon in the Bradypodion ("slow footed") genus that is endemic to South Africa. It is a forest dweller, found only in a limited range in the afromontane forests near Knysna, South Africa, and in certain surrounding areas.

== Description ==
This species has the longest tail of all the Bradypodion species. As with most chameleons, its tongue is twice the length of its body and it can be shot out of its mouth using a special muscle in the jaw. This gives the chameleon the ability to catch insects some distance away. The Knysna dwarf chameleon has a prominent casque and has bright green to bluish skin, decorated with purple, yellow and pink hues. It is up to 180 mm (7.1 in) total length.

== Taxonomy ==
In the past, most South African dwarf chameleons were considered to be a subspecies of one Cape Bradypodion species This is now known to be wrong, however; B. damaranum does not appear to have any particularly close living relatives. Like the Cape dwarf chameleon, it seems to be a basal offshoot of the ancestral stock which gave rise to all Bradypodion chameleon species.

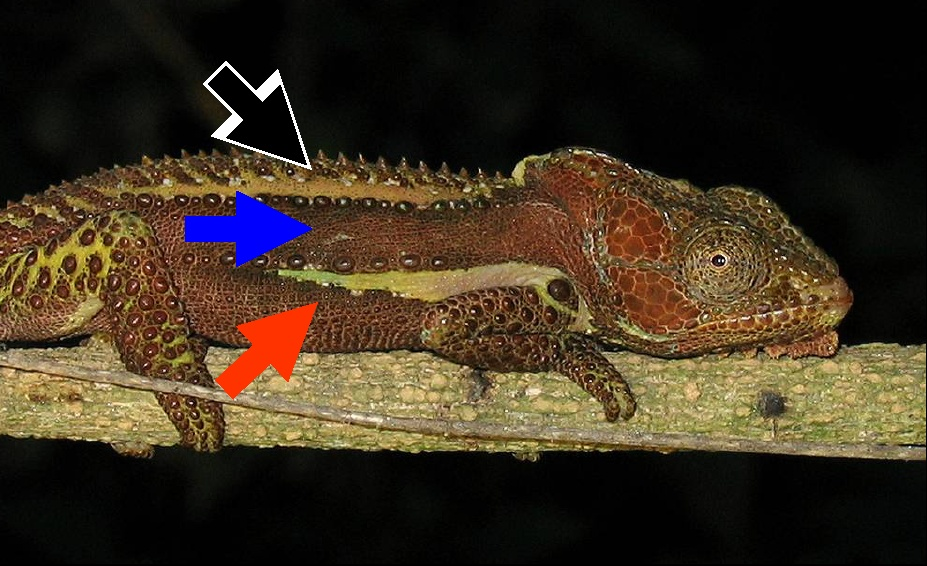
Male Knysna dwarf chameleon, submissive coloration

== Distribution ==
The Knysna dwarf chameleon is distributed on the south-facing slopes of the Outeniqua and Tsitsikamma Mountains down to the coast in the eastern Western Cape and western Eastern Cape.

== Habitat ==
The normal habitat of Bradypodion damaranum is Fynbos and Afromontane Forest; it is often found in gardens.

=== Urban environments ===
This chameleon also readily adapts to living in gardens. However, not all suburban areas are suitable. Chameleons can only survive in gardens with much bushy and varied vegetation. Most suitable are bushes and small trees which have fine foliage or thin twigs that chameleons can grasp with their hands and use as perches. Pruning or trimming of bushes will usually injure and kill the chameleons. They will avoid lawns too. Chameleons wander and, in suburbs with smaller gardens, they also avoid properties which are not connected to larger "green corridors" which extend over several properties.

In urban areas its predators are mainly domestic cats - a non-native, introduced predator, against which chameleons are relatively defenseless. Other predators include a range of urban and introduced bird species such as crows. Certain gardening practices such as using insecticides or hedge trimmers can also kill off urban populations.
