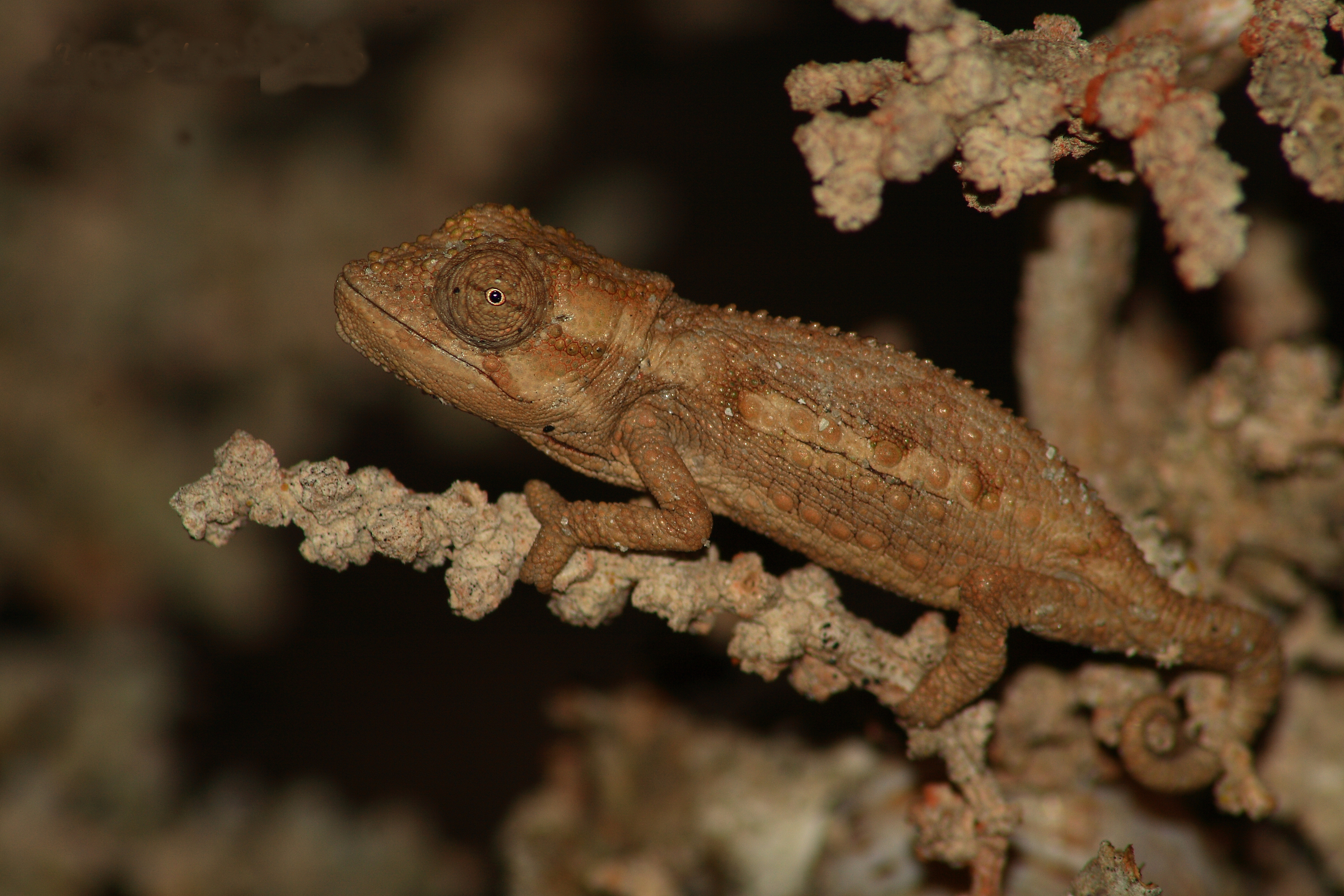

Conservation status
- Least Concern (IUCN 3.1)
- CITES Appendix II (CITES)

Scientific classification
- Kingdom: Animalia
- Phylum: Chordata
- Class: Reptilia
- Order: Squamata
- Suborder: Iguania
- Family: Chamaeleonidae
- Genus: Bradypodion
- Species: B. occidentale

Binomial name
- Bradypodion occidentale (Hewitt, 1935)
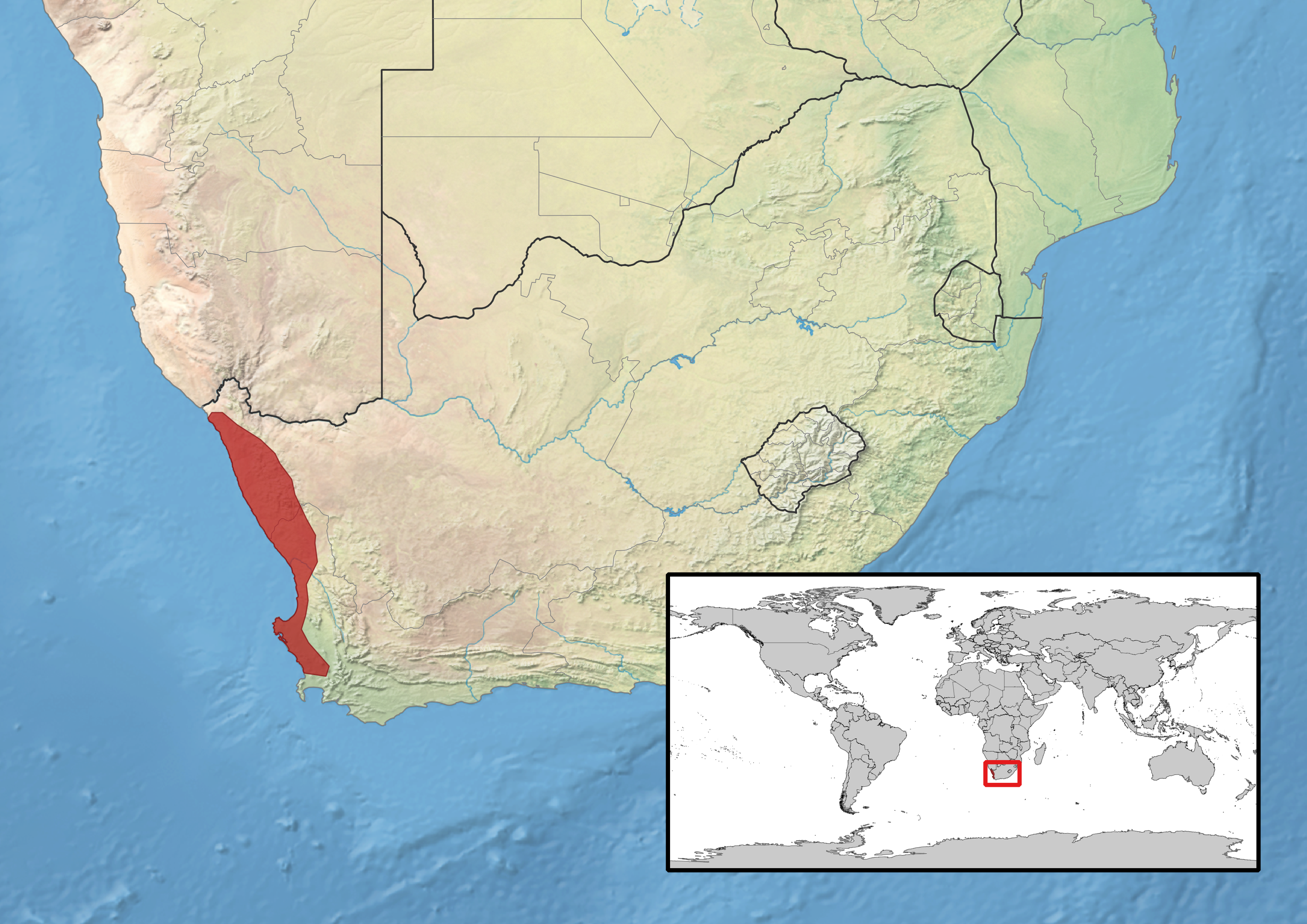

= Namaqua dwarf chameleon =

Species of lizard

The Namaqua dwarf chameleon or the western dwarf chameleon (Bradypodion occidentale) occurs in beach vegetation, along the west coast of South Africa and Namibia.

== Description ==
The Namaqua is relatively large for a Dwarf Chameleon, reaching up to 16 cm in length. It also has a relatively stocky build, and the shortest tail of its genus. It has several distinctive "gular" grooves under its chin, running from its mouth down to the top of its chest. In colour it is a dull, mottled brown-grey.

== Natural distribution ==
This species occurs along the coastal regions of the far west of South Africa. It is found in a belt from Melkbosstrand (near Cape Town) in the south, up to Lüderitz, Namibia.

In this range, it favours the coastal Strandveld vegetation and is only very rarely found further inland. In the south, near Cape Town, its range slightly overlaps with that of the Cape Dwarf Chameleon, but the two favour different habitats. They can also easily be distinguished as the Cape Dwarf Chameleon has far brighter colouration, with a lighter build, longer tail, and blunter nose and casque.

In the vicinity of human habitation, they have a tendency to fall victim to domestic cats. They are also threatened by habitat loss, as coastal vegetation is increasingly disturbed for development.
