= Grootvadersbosch Nature Reserve =

South African nature reserve

- Interactive map of Grootvadersbosch Nature Reserve
- Type: Nature reserve
- Location: Overberg
- Coordinates: 33°59′08.4″S 20°49′24.7″E
- Area: 250 hectares (620 acres)
- Website: Grootvadersbosch Nature Reserve - CapeNature

Grootvadersbosch is a historic farm in the Overberg, and the surrounding area is currently a nature reserve in the southern portion of the Boosmansbos Wilderness Area, in Western Cape, South Africa.

== Location ==
Grootvadersbosch is in the foothills of the Langeberg, east of Oude Post and the Tradouws Pass to Barrydale and north of the gravel road from Swellendam over the Buffeljags River to Suurbraak and Heidelberg. Both the Slang River (not the one in Mpumalanga) and the Duiwenhoks River spring from the region.

== Nature reserve ==
Grootvadersbosch is the largest remaining native forest in the Langeberg. Both a foot trail and a mountain bike trail have been developed in the reserve.

== Animal life ==
The Cape bushbuck was first seen by European scientists in this forest in 1776, when the Swede Anders Sparrman visited. After searching for more than 50 years, herpetologist John D. Visser finally found eggs of the frog species known as the Eastern ghost frog (Heleophyryne orientalis) here. The vulnerable Grootvadersbosch dwarf chameleon (Bradypodion venustum) is endemic to its forested region.

== History ==
Dutch East India Company soldiers began cutting trees in this forest early on. Trekboers settled in the area, and in 1724 Roelof Olofsz founded Grootvadersbosch farm. Later, it would be owned by Jacobus Steyn. In 1744, Dutch Cape Colony Governor Hendrik Swellengrebel founded as school here where Abraham Schietekat worked as a teacher and ministered to the local Boers. Benjamin Moodie purchased the farm in 1817, and the Moodie family cradle in Southern Africa would become one of the leading farms in the Overberg. It supplied wood, wheat, fruit, tobacco, wine, and brandy. The farm was visited by several famous people over the years: the botanists Carl Peter Thunberg and Francis Masson in 1772, traveler and explorer François Levaillant in 1782, the missionary botanist James Backhouse, and the missionary John Philip in 1830.

== Bibliography ==
- Burrows, Edmund H.: Overberg Outspan: A chronicle of people and places in the south western districts of the Cape. Swelllendam: Swellendam Trust, 1988. ISBN 0-620-12930-1
