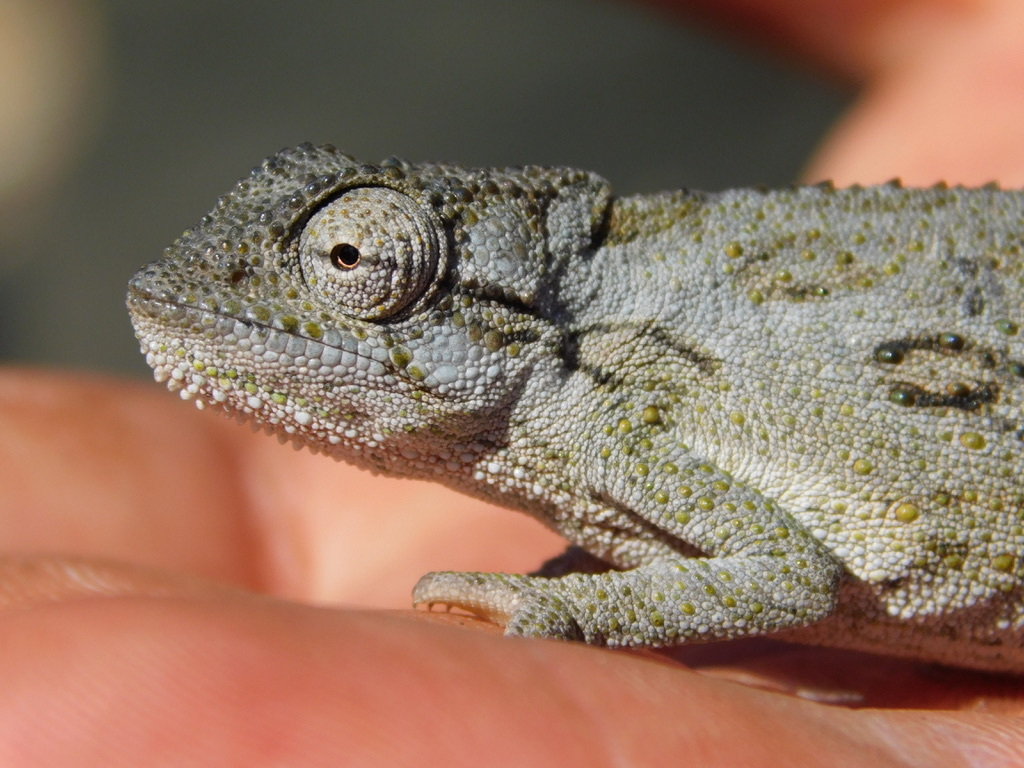

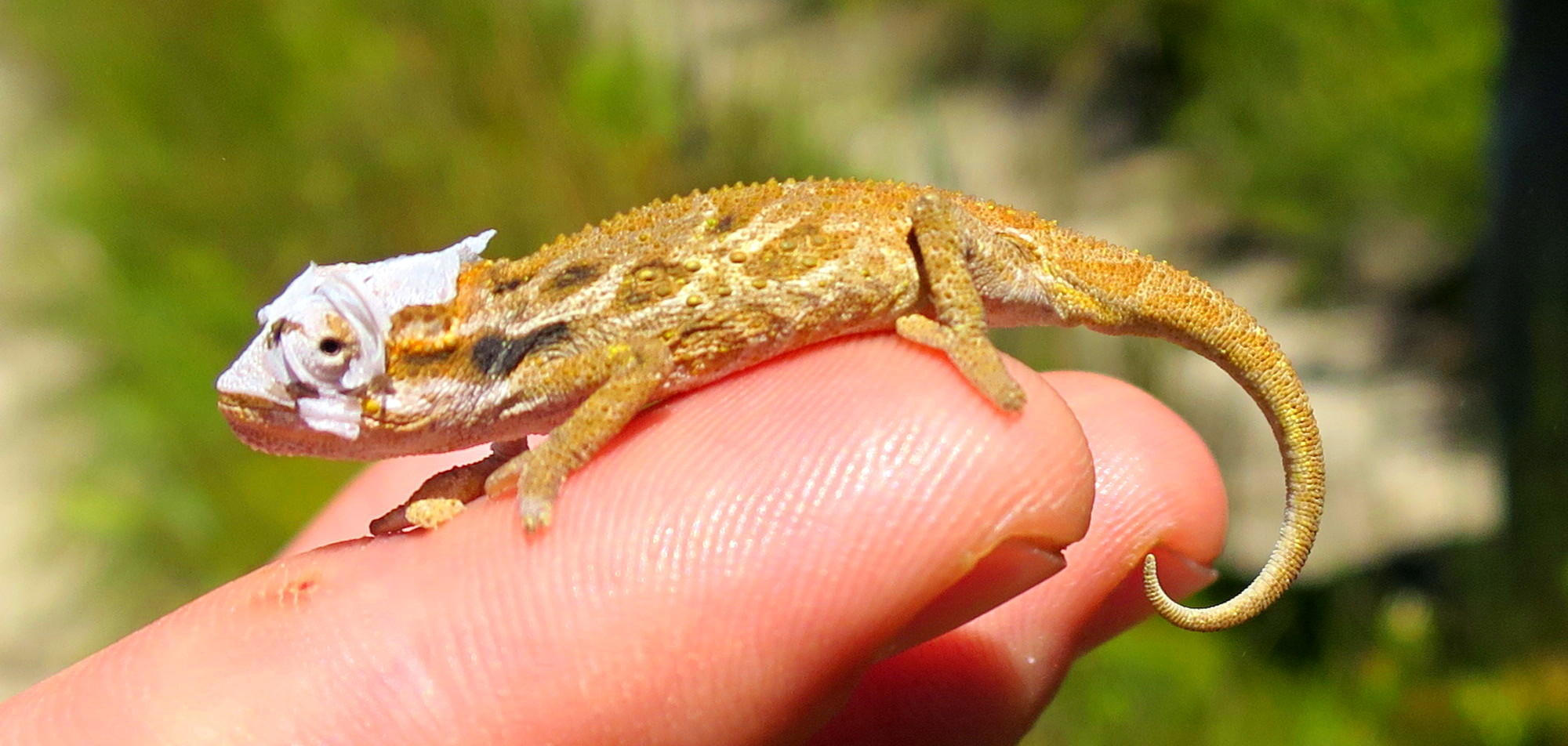

Conservation status
- Least Concern (IUCN 3.1)

Scientific classification
- Kingdom: Animalia
- Phylum: Chordata
- Class: Reptilia
- Order: Squamata
- Suborder: Iguania
- Family: Chamaeleonidae
- Genus: Bradypodion
- Species: B. barbatulum

Binomial name
- Bradypodion barbatulum Tolley, Tilbury, & M Burger, 2022

= Bradypodion barbatulum =

Species of lizard

Bradypodion barbatulum is a beardless dwarf chameleon endemic to South Africa. Bradypodion (meaning "slow-footed" in Greek) is one of six genera of chameleons that are native to southern Africa, sometimes collectively called South African dwarf chameleons.
