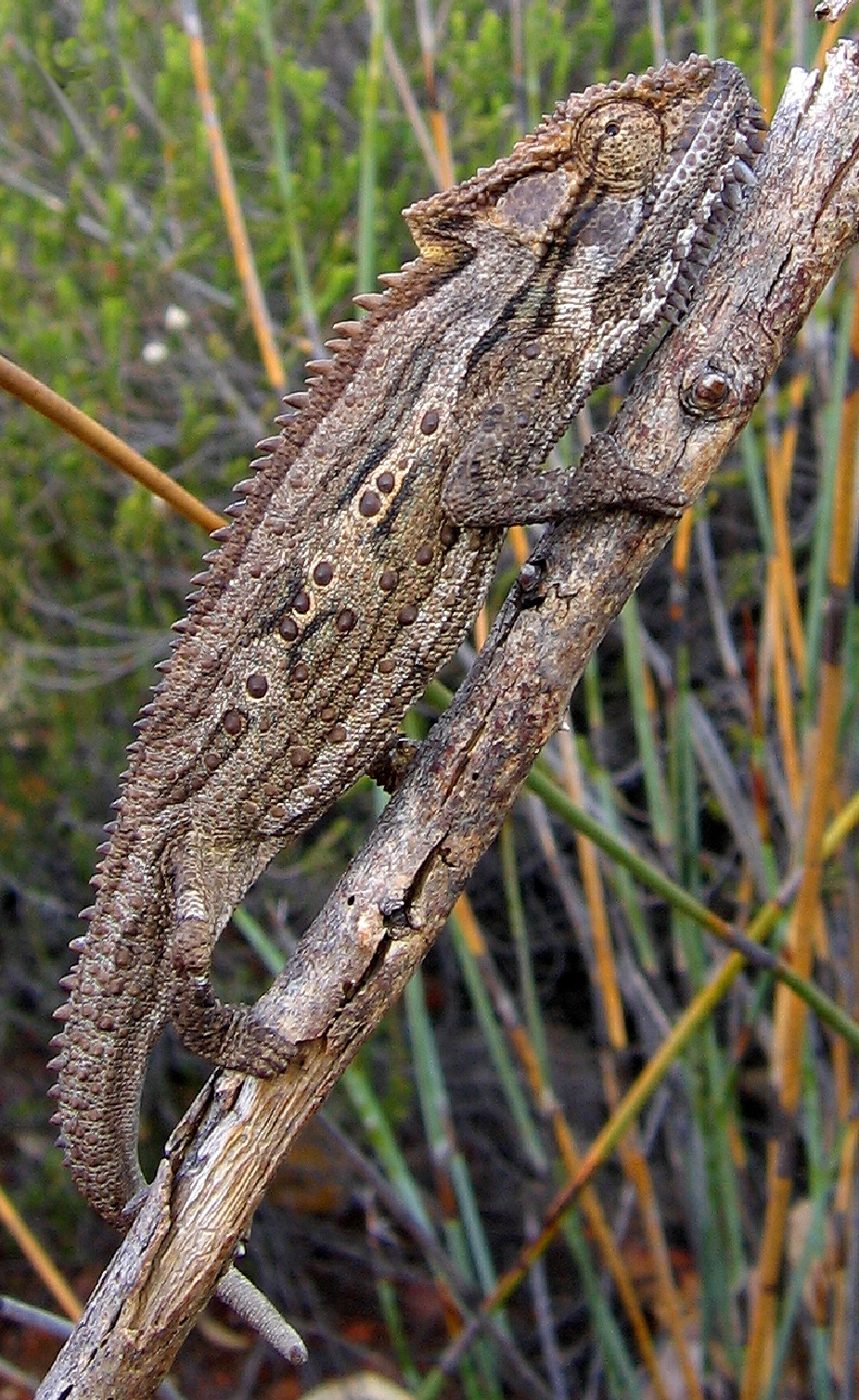
- Robertson dwarf chameleon (Bradypodion gutturale) at Anysberg Nature Reserve

Scientific classification
- Kingdom: Animalia
- Phylum: Chordata
- Class: Reptilia
- Order: Squamata
- Suborder: Iguania
- Family: Chamaeleonidae
- Subfamily: Chamaeleoninae
- Genus: Bradypodion; Fitzinger, 1843

Type species
- Chamaeleo pumilus Daudin, 1802

Diversity
- 20 species

= Bradypodion =

Genus of lizards

Bradypodion (meaning "slow-footed" in Greek) is a genus of chameleons in the family Chamaeleonidae, collectively called South African dwarf chameleons. All species are found in South Africa and most are endemic to this country, but a few can also be found in Eswatini, Lesotho, southernmost Namibia and possibly southernmost Mozambique. They are quite small chameleons, and different species often can be difficult to separate by appearance, although exact location (each species tends to have a small distribution) and the intense breeding colours of males are useful for their identification. They are arboreal, but some species are mostly found low in the vegetation.

Bradypodion feed on small invertebrates, especially insects. They rapidly reach sexual maturity, typically at an age between half a year and one year, but sometimes up to two years. Adult males are territorial. It is the only genus of chameleon where females of all species give birth to live young rather than lay eggs (the only other chameleons that give birth to live young are certain Trioceros species). This is likely an adaption to the relatively cold climate of southern Africa in comparison to tropical Africa. Colder temperatures slow the development of eggs laid in the ground; when instead retained inside the body until birth, a female can actively sun bask to increase the temperature. A female can give birth to up to 20 young per time, twice or rarely even three times in a year.

Up until the early 2000s, some other chameleons from eastern and central Africa were occasionally placed herein, but they are now placed in Kinyongia and Nadzikambia.

== Species ==
20 species are currently recognized:

Image	Common name	Scientific name	Distribution
	Swartberg dwarf chameleon	B. atromontanum	Western Cape, South Africa
	Beardless dwarf chameleon	B. barbatulum	South Africa
	Baviaanskloof mountains dwarf chameleon	B.baviaanense	South Africa
	uMlalazi dwarf chameleon	B. caeruleogula	KwaZulu-Natal, South Africa.
	Transkei dwarf chameleon	B. caffrum	Eastern Cape Province of South Africa
	Knysna dwarf chameleon	B. damaranum	Knysna, South Africa
	Drakensberg dwarf chameleon	B. dracomontanum	Drakensberg, South Africa
	Robertson dwarf chameleon	B. gutturale (may be several species)	Western Cape province, South Africa.
	Kentani dwarf chameleon	B. kentanicum	Eastern Cape, South Africa.
	Black-headed dwarf chameleon	B. melanocephalum	KwaZulu-Natal, South Africa.
	Zululand dwarf chameleon	B. nemorale (probably several species)	South Africa.
	Ngome dwarf chameleon	B. ngomeense	Ngome Forest, Kwa-Zulu Natal.
	Namaqua dwarf chameleon	B. occidentale	South Africa and Namibia.
	Cape dwarf chameleon	B. pumilum	South African province of the Western Cape
	Setaro's dwarf chameleon	B. setaroi	northern Kwazulu Natal, South Africa
	Smith's dwarf chameleon	B. taeniabronchum	South Africa
	Natal Midlands dwarf chameleon	B. thamnobates	South African province of KwaZulu-Natal.
	Transvaal dwarf chameleon	B. transvaalense	Mpumalanga and Limpopo provinces, South Africa
	Southern dwarf chameleon	B. ventrale	Eastern Cape, South Africa.
	Grootvadersbosch dwarf chameleon	B. venustum	South Africa

== Undescribed species ==
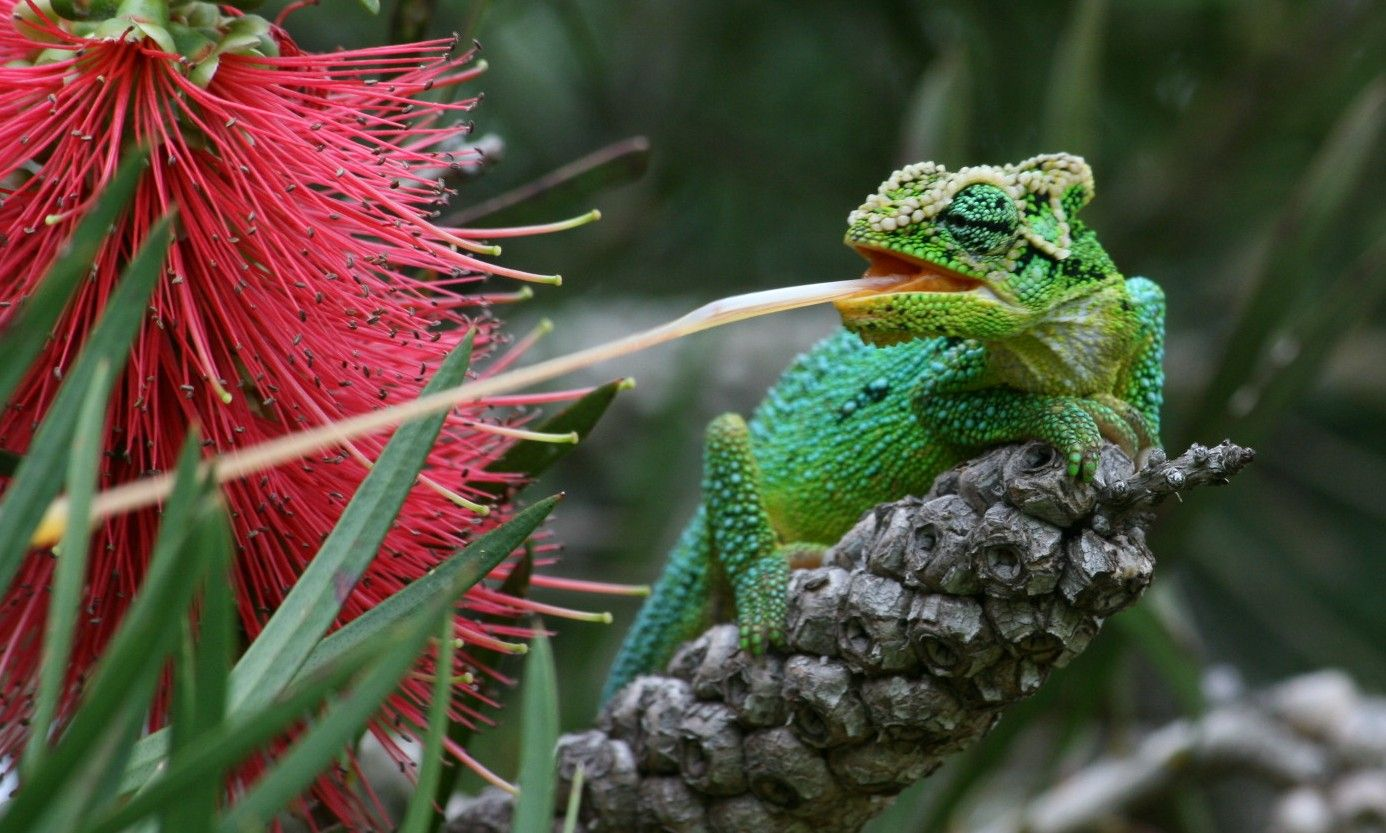
An emerald dwarf chameleon

- Emerald dwarf chameleon, Bradypodion sp. (Emerald)
- Bradypodion sp. (Groendal)
- Bradypodion sp. (Grootvadersbosch)
- Bradypodion sp. (Jagersbos)

== Systematics ==
Delimitation of Bradypodion has been controversial for some time. Most species seem readily distinguishable by morphological characteristics, but for some time the genus was used as a wastebin taxon for smaller chameleons from sub-Saharan Africa with plesiomorphic hemipenises. Alternatively, many of the present species were reduced to subspecies status. This has since been refuted, but several more species seem recognizable judging from morphological and mitochondrial 16S rRNA and NADH dehydrogenase subunit 2 sequence data.

The phylogeny and biogeography of this group is quite consistently resolved. The Cape dwarf chameleon and the Knysna dwarf chameleon (and possibly one new species close to it) are basal lineages with unclear relationships; they seem a bit closer to each other than to any other species, but altogether are quite distant. They occur in isolated ranges in coastal Western Cape and western Eastern Cape provinces. Inhabiting a wide range of habitats, they are (for the genus) large, and have brilliant, predominantly green coloration and long tails - just as in many Chamaeleo. These characters are plesiomorphic, retained from the genus' ancestor.

The remaining species form a well-supported clade, which in turn can be divided into smaller groups. One consists of forms that radiated on the seawards slopes of the Drakensberg Mountains: the southern Drakensberg dwarf chameleon, the northern Transvaal dwarf chameleon, and what appears to be undescribed species from the Ngome Forest on the southeastern slopes. These are also plesiomorphic in habitus and habits.

Another group of taxa occurs from easternmost Eastern Cape to central KwaZulu-Natal provinces, between Gilboa Forest and the Tugela River. These inhabit a wide range of habitat and contain the plesiomorphic Natal Midlands dwarf chameleon from the namesake region, the small black-headed dwarf chameleon which inhabits fynbos and other low forest on slopes of mainly coastal KwaZulu-Natal, and another probable new species from the Gilboa Forest area. These appear to be a quite recent radiation from a single ancestor, and the group requires more research as regards species limits, and geographical delimitation from the Drakensberg dwarf chameleon.

Several largish but short-tailed and cryptic taxa inhabit more arid habitats such as karoo. The Karroo and southern dwarf chameleons seem to have considerable gene flow range from Northern Cape to coastal Eastern Cape provinces. The small and nearly extinct Smith's dwarf chameleon is close to these; it occurs on the escarpment inland from Jeffreys Bay. Less closely related is the Robertson dwarf chameleon, another aridland species which is found in Western Cape province inland from the range of the Cape dwarf chameleon and may be a cryptic species complex, and an undescribed population from the Swartberg Mountains. The last species with aridland apomorphies, the Namaqua dwarf chameleon, is quite distant to the others; it occurs in coastal regions from north of the Cape species through Namaqualand. This is probably still a part of a single radiation which brought about all the aridland taxa, and eventually Smith's dwarf chameleon.

The remaining species are all small inhabitants of forested slopes and fynbos, such as the black-headed and Smith's dwarf chameleons. However, as already indicated by the distinctness of these two, their morphologies seem to be a convergent adaptation. The Kentani and Transkei dwarf chameleons from the east coasts of Eastern Cape may or may not be each other's closest relatives. Setaro's dwarf chameleon from northeastern coastal KwaZulu-Natal is not close to these. The Zululand dwarf chameleon from western uThungulu apparently consists of two or more species, one that may be closer to the preceding, and one that might be an early offshoot of the ancestral Drakensberg stock, and which are distinguishable by morphological and mtDNA characteristics.

In conclusion, of the three basic morphotypes found in this genus, one (bright, long-tailed, large) is plesiomorphic, another (large, short-tailed, drab) apparently only evolved once, and the third (the small, slope-inhabiting forms) are convergent in morphology. The ancestors of Bradypodion thus were mid-sized chameleons with vivid color, which settled the Cape region from roughly north-northwestwards. Due to climate changes with fluctuating aridity, the basal lineages inhabiting humid fynbos in the southwest became isolated from each other and from the animals living around the border region between Northern and Eastern Cape and Free State, and Lesotho. The aridland habitat fluctuates in extent during climate shifts, and mountainous habitat becomes fragmented or consolidates accordingly. Consequently, the Drakensberg, the B. thamnobates-B. melanocephalum, and the aridland group, as well as several coastal lineages, diverged and evolved to their present-day ranges and diversity.
