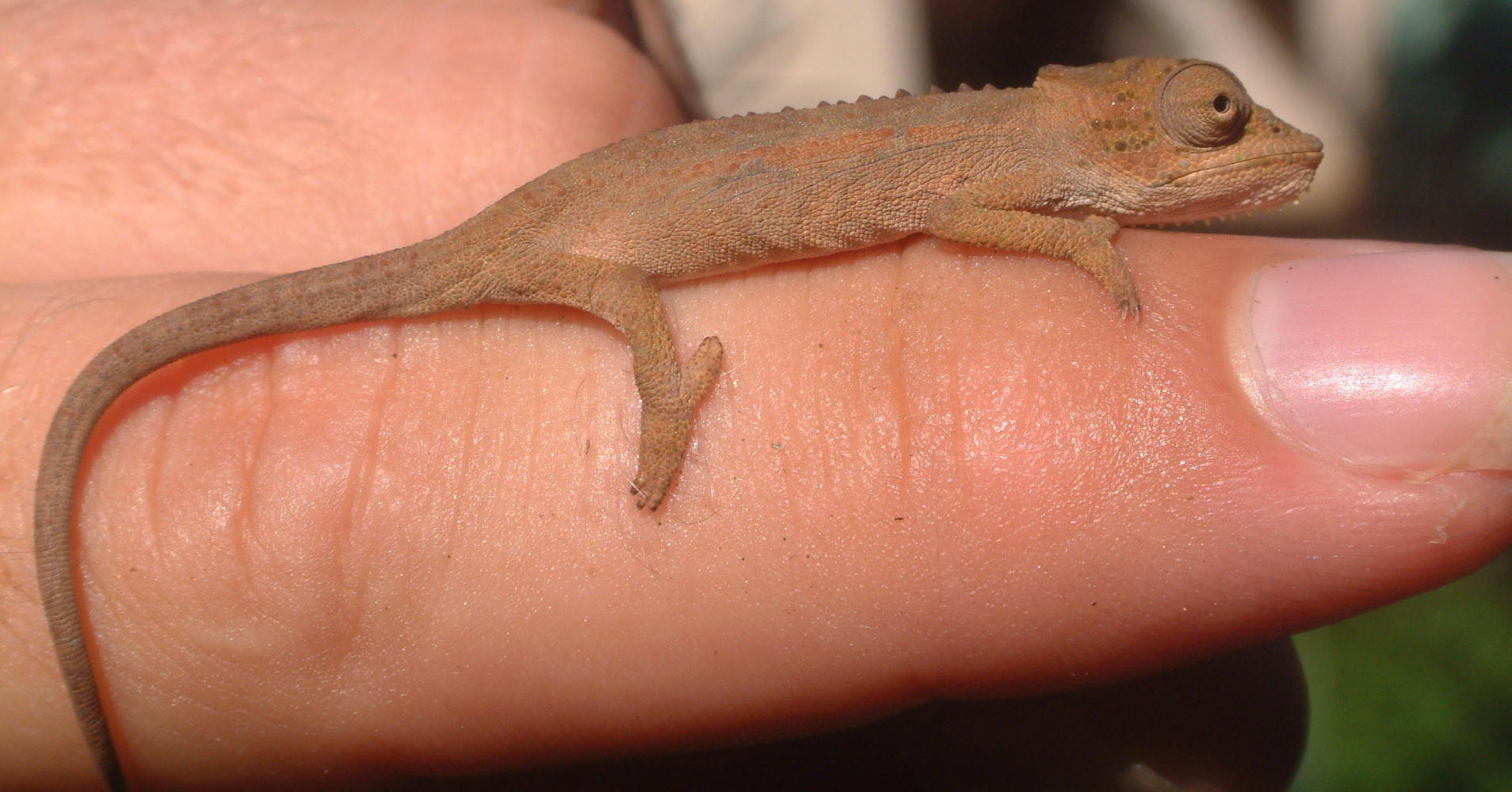

Conservation status
- Near Threatened (IUCN 3.1)
- CITES Appendix II

Scientific classification
- Kingdom: Animalia
- Phylum: Chordata
- Class: Reptilia
- Order: Squamata
- Suborder: Iguania
- Family: Chamaeleonidae
- Genus: Bradypodion
- Species: B. setaroi

Binomial name
- Bradypodion setaroi Raw, 1976
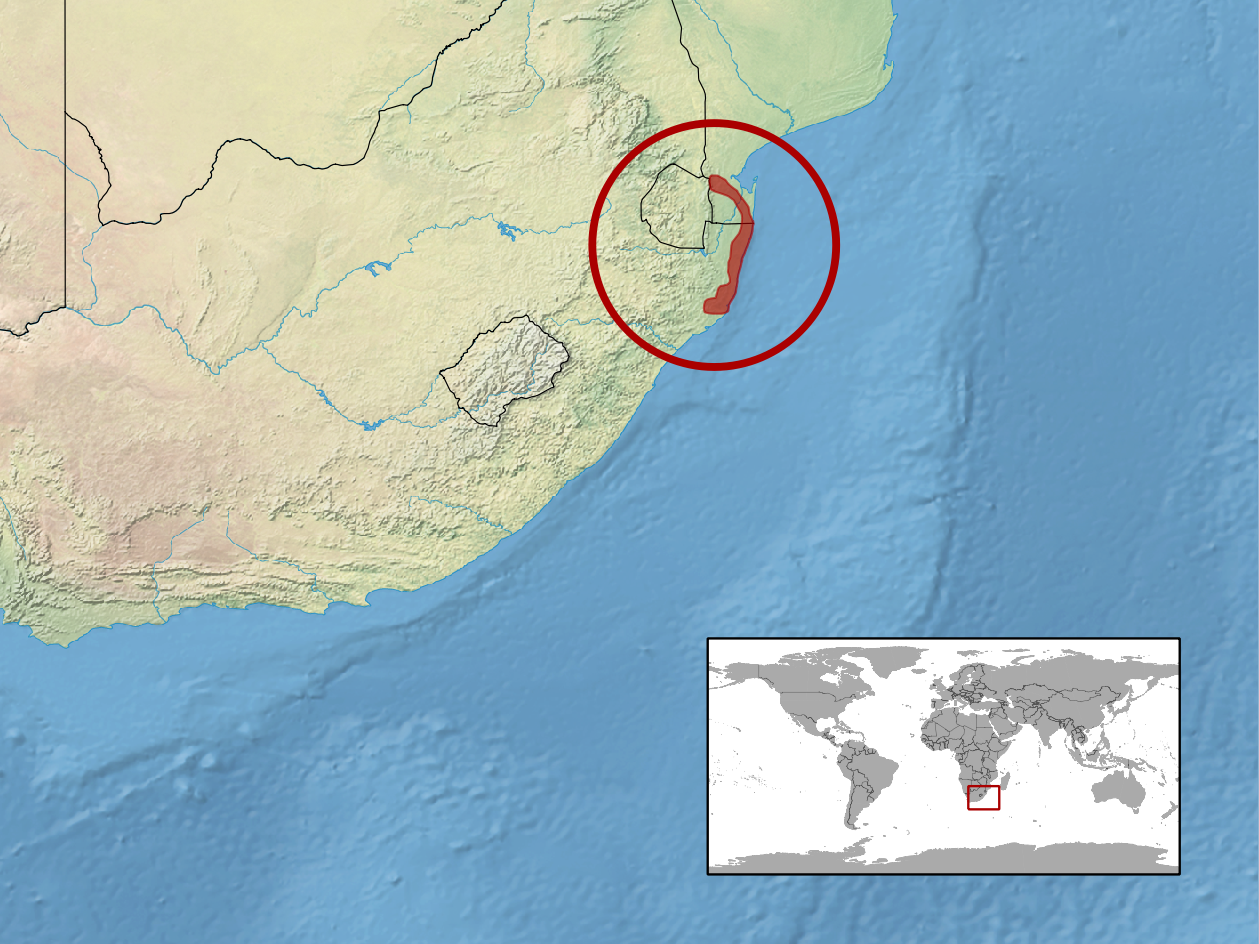

= Setaro's dwarf chameleon =

Species of lizard

Setaro's dwarf chameleon (Bradypodion setaroi) is a species of lizard in the family Chamaeleonidae.

== Etymology ==
The specific name, setaroi, is in honor of Gordon Setaro who collected the holotype with Raw.

== Description ==
With a total length (including tail) of about 10 cm (3.9 in), B. setaroi is one of the smallest of all the dwarf chameleons. It has a reduced throat crest and a tail that is longer than the body in males, and shorter than the body in females.

== Geographic range and habitat ==
B. setaroi is endemic to South Africa, where it is restricted to coastal dune forests in northern Kwazulu Natal. It adapts well to suburban gardens, but domestic cats — as introduced predators — will usually kill all chameleons in the immediate area.
