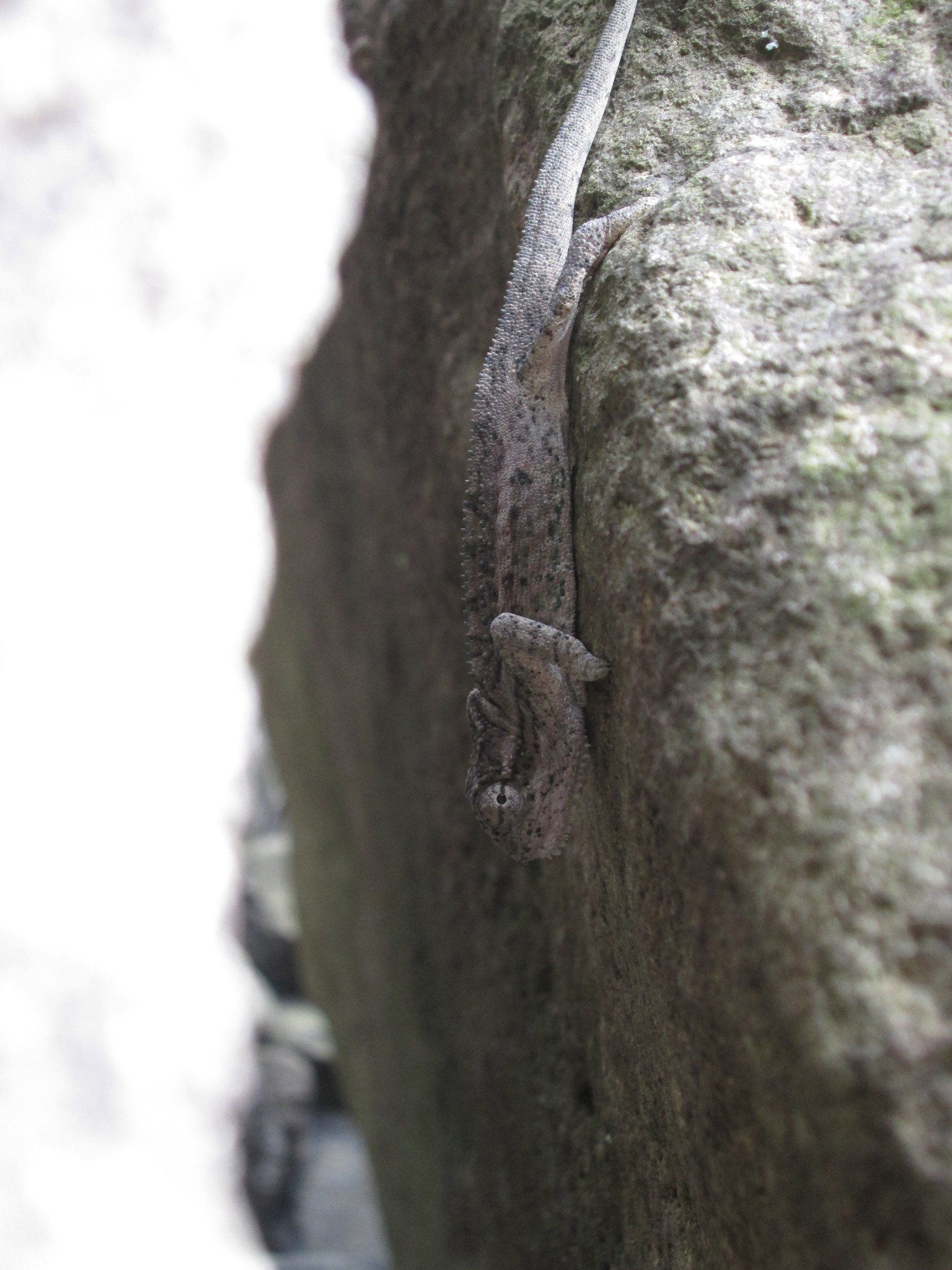

Conservation status
- Near Threatened (IUCN 3.1)
- CITES Appendix II (CITES)

Scientific classification
- Kingdom: Animalia
- Phylum: Chordata
- Class: Reptilia
- Order: Squamata
- Suborder: Iguania
- Family: Chamaeleonidae
- Genus: Bradypodion
- Species: B. dracomontanum

Binomial name
- Bradypodion dracomontanum (Raw, 1976)
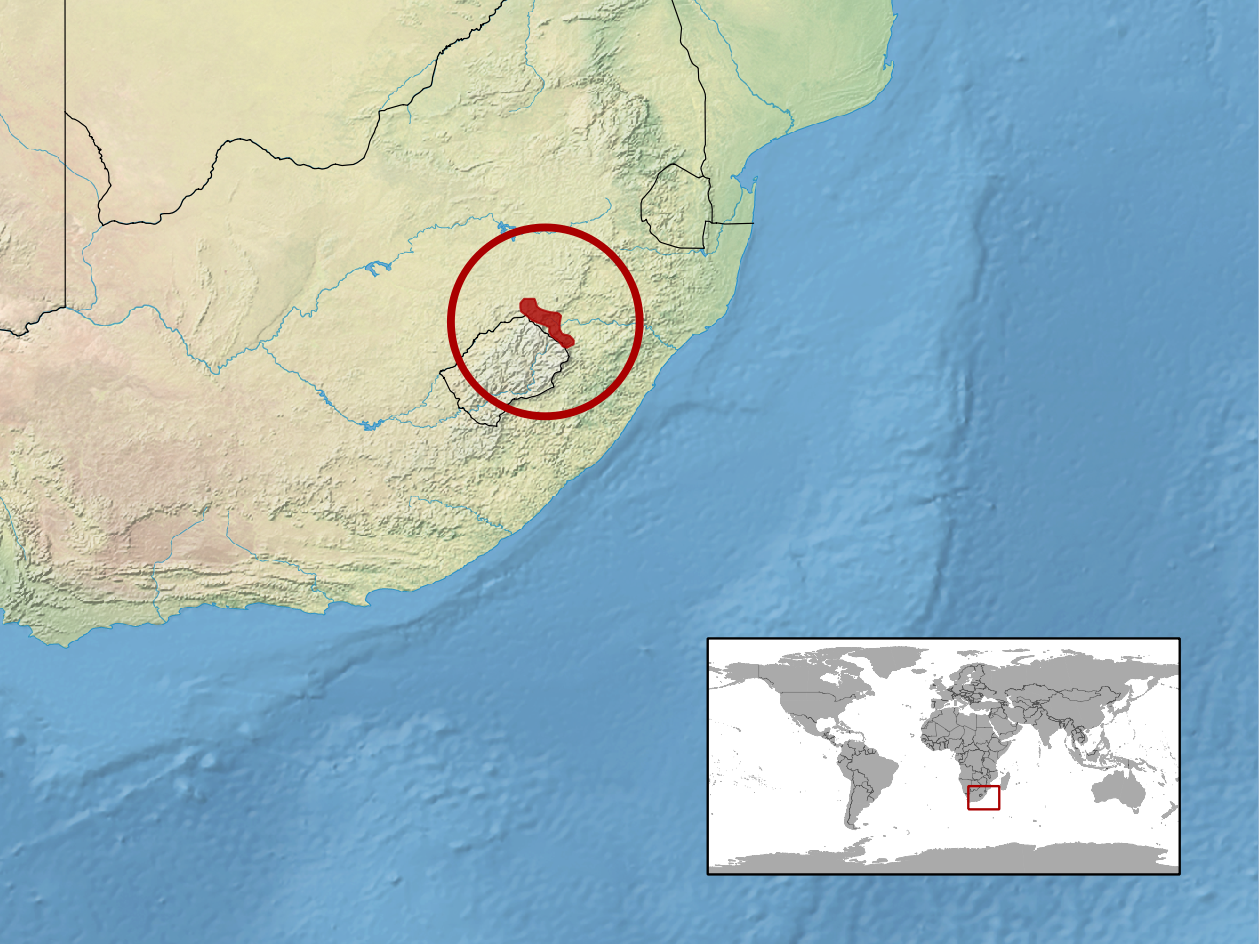

= Drakensberg dwarf chameleon =

Species of lizard

The Drakensberg dwarf chameleon (Bradypodion dracomontanum) occurs in the Drakensberg, South Africa, between the latitudes of 27°45′ and 29°15′. Bright green dwarf chameleons (emerald dwarf chameleon) found in the Drakensberg south of 29°15′ are now known to be more closely related to the Natal Midlands dwarf chameleon (Bradypodion thamnobates) and may yet be described as a separate species.

== Bibliography ==
- Tolley, K. and Burger, M. 2007. Chameleons of Southern Africa. ISBN 978-1-77007-375-3.
