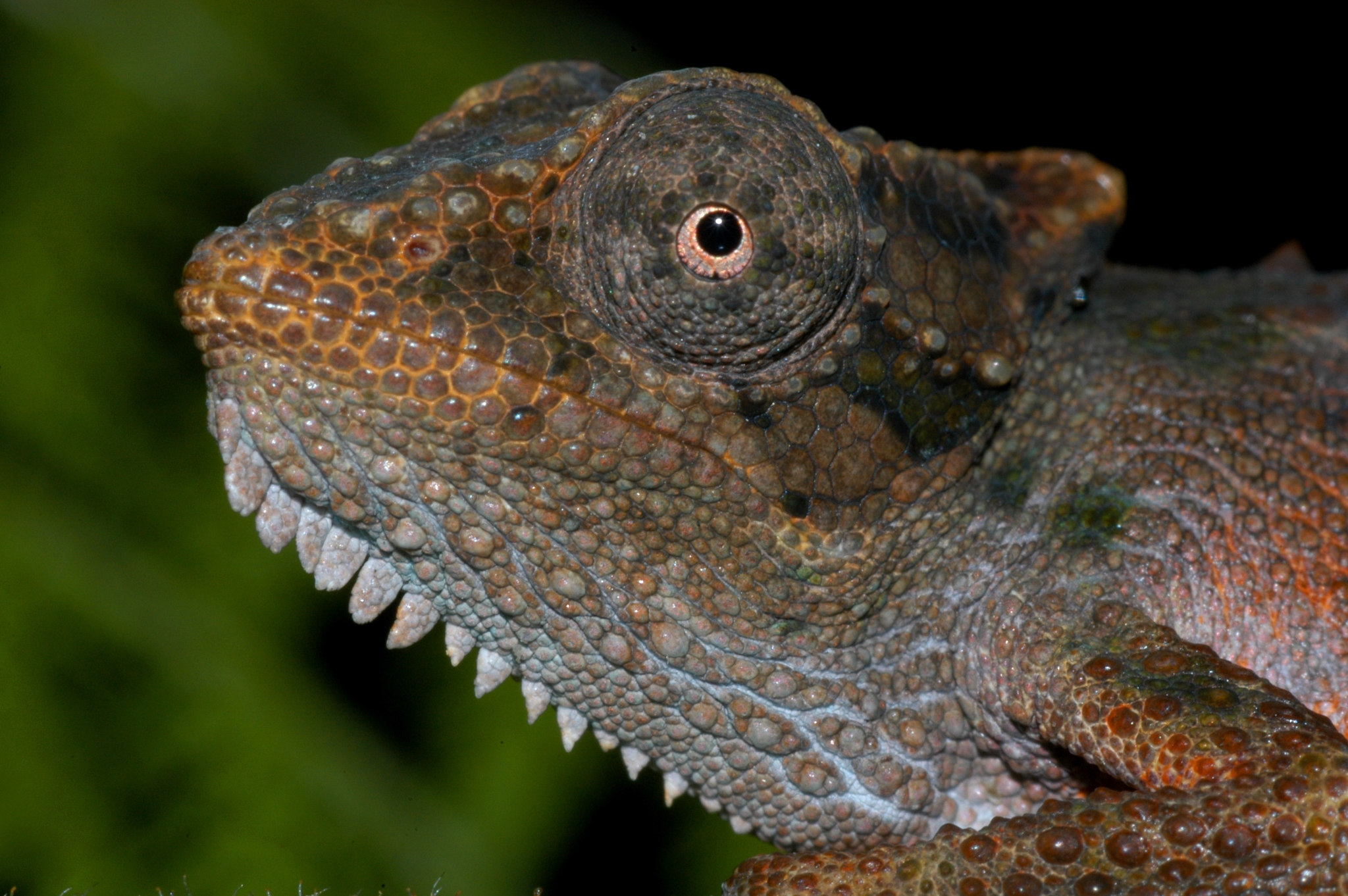

Conservation status
- Vulnerable (IUCN 3.1)
- CITES Appendix II (CITES)

Scientific classification
- Kingdom: Animalia
- Phylum: Chordata
- Class: Reptilia
- Order: Squamata
- Suborder: Iguania
- Family: Chamaeleonidae
- Genus: Bradypodion
- Species: B. nemorale

Binomial name
- Bradypodion nemorale Raw, 1978

= Zululand dwarf chameleon =

Species of lizard

The Zululand dwarf chameleon (Bradypodion nemorale) is a species of lizard in the family Chamaeleonidae. It is also known as the Qudeni dwarf chameleon. It is endemic to South Africa.
