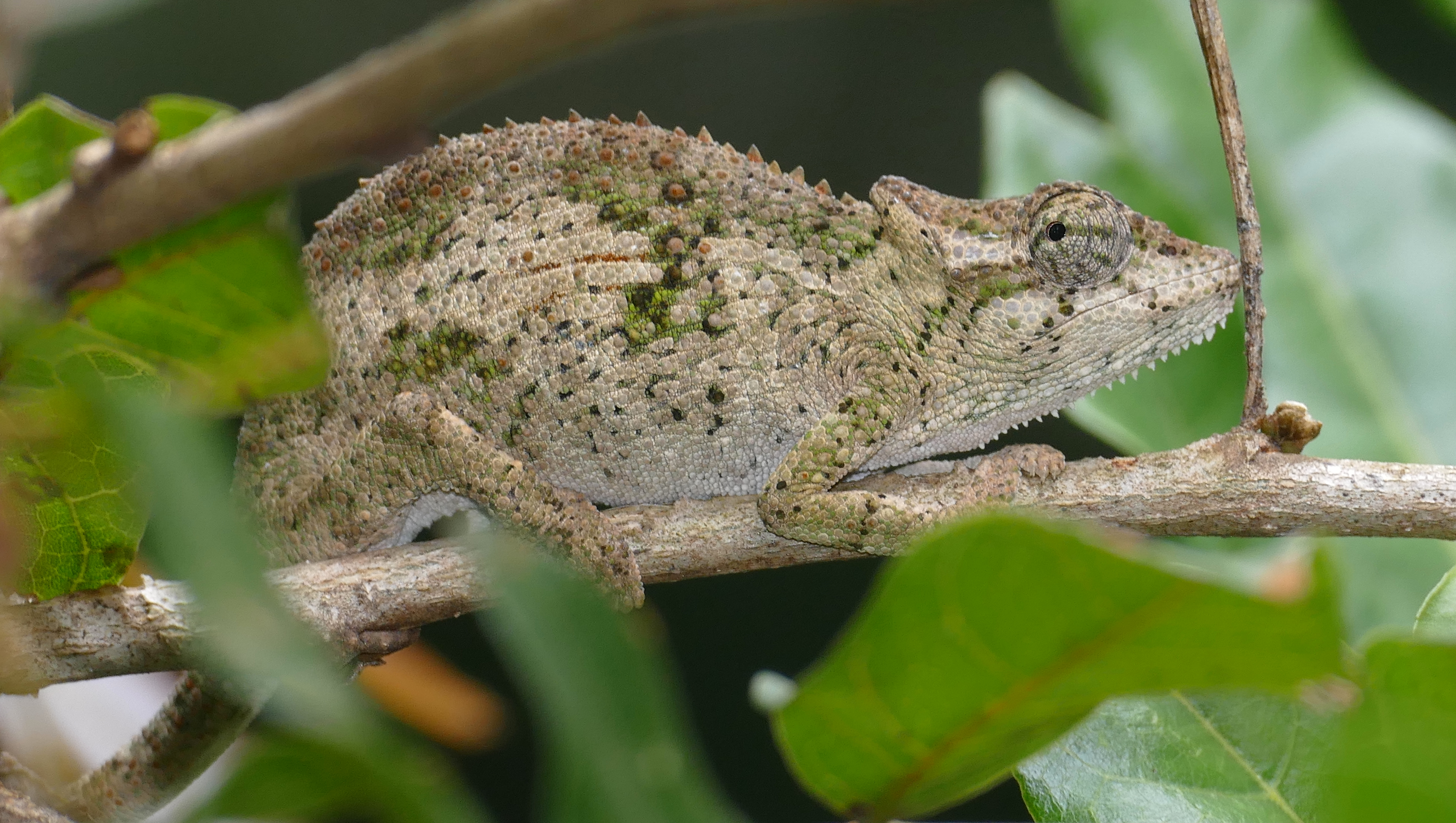

Conservation status
- Endangered (IUCN 3.1)
- CITES Appendix II

Scientific classification
- Kingdom: Animalia
- Phylum: Chordata
- Class: Reptilia
- Order: Squamata
- Suborder: Iguania
- Family: Chamaeleonidae
- Genus: Bradypodion
- Species: B. caeruleogula

Binomial name
- Bradypodion caeruleogula Raw & Brothers, 2008
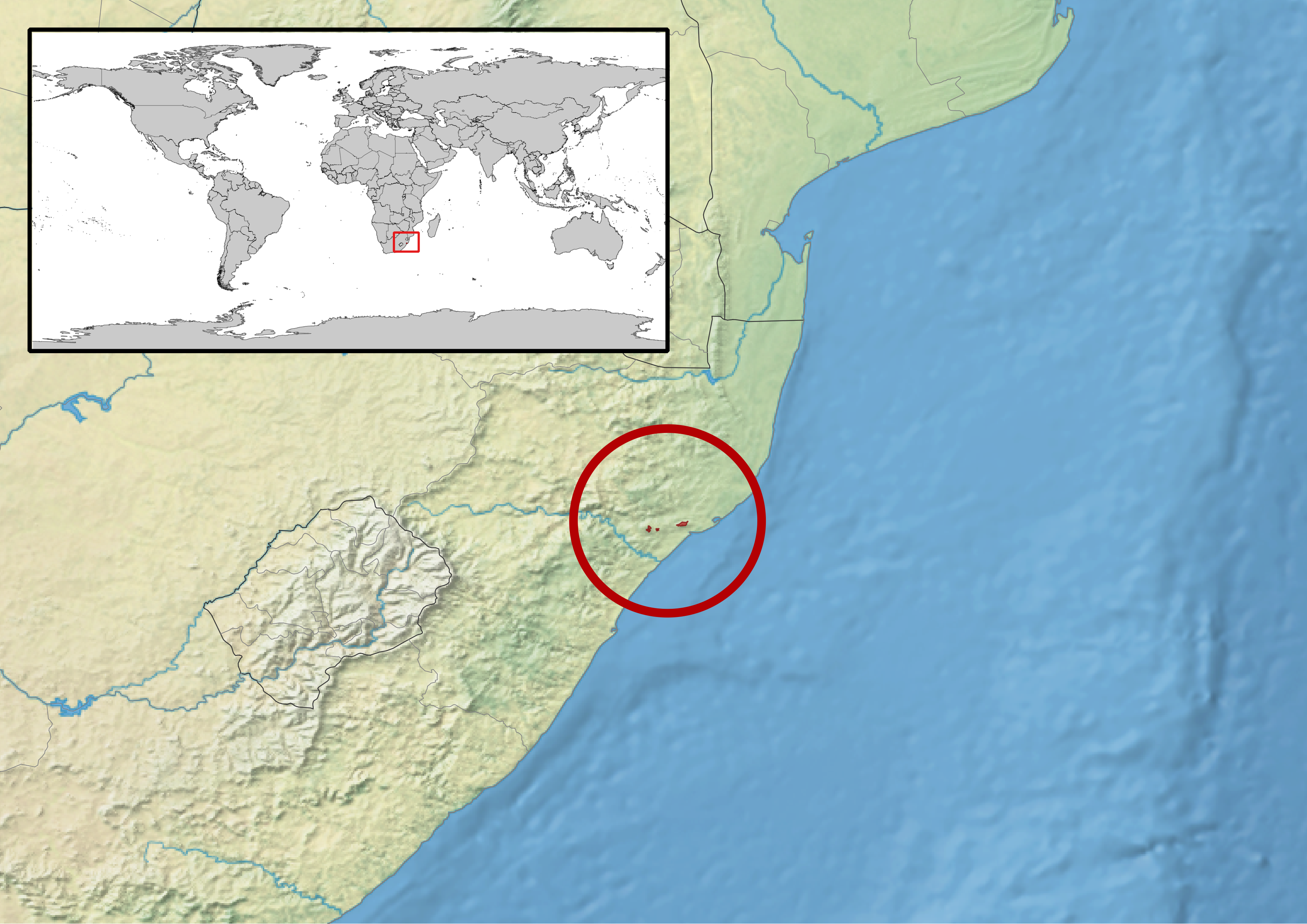

= Bradypodion caeruleogula =

Dhlinza dwarf chameleon

Species of lizard

Bradypodion caeruleogula, the Dhlinza dwarf chameleon, Eshowe dwarf chameleon, or uMlalazi dwarf chameleon, is endemic to KwaZulu-Natal, South Africa. It is found in Dhlinza, Entumeni and Ongoye Forests.
