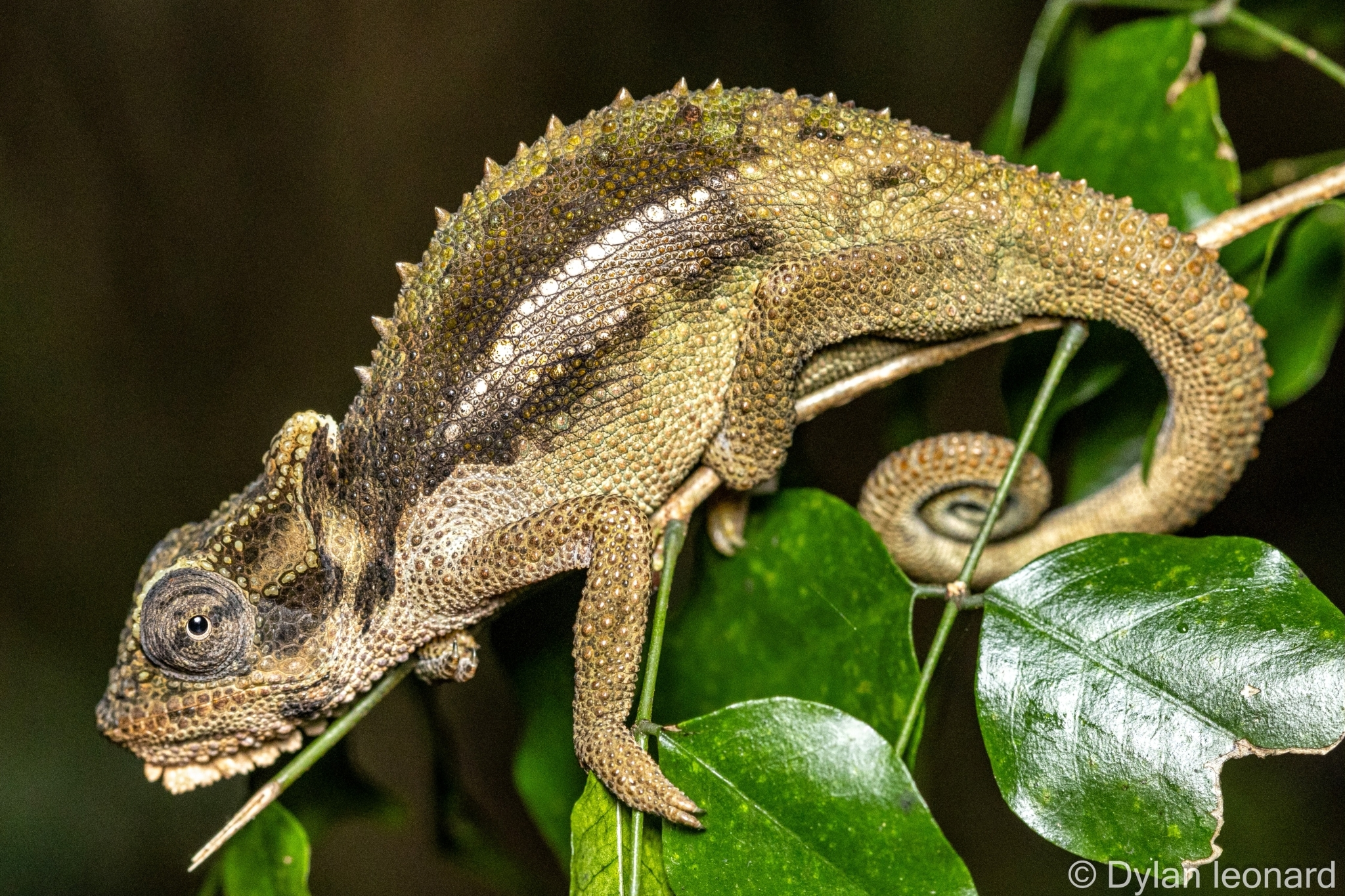

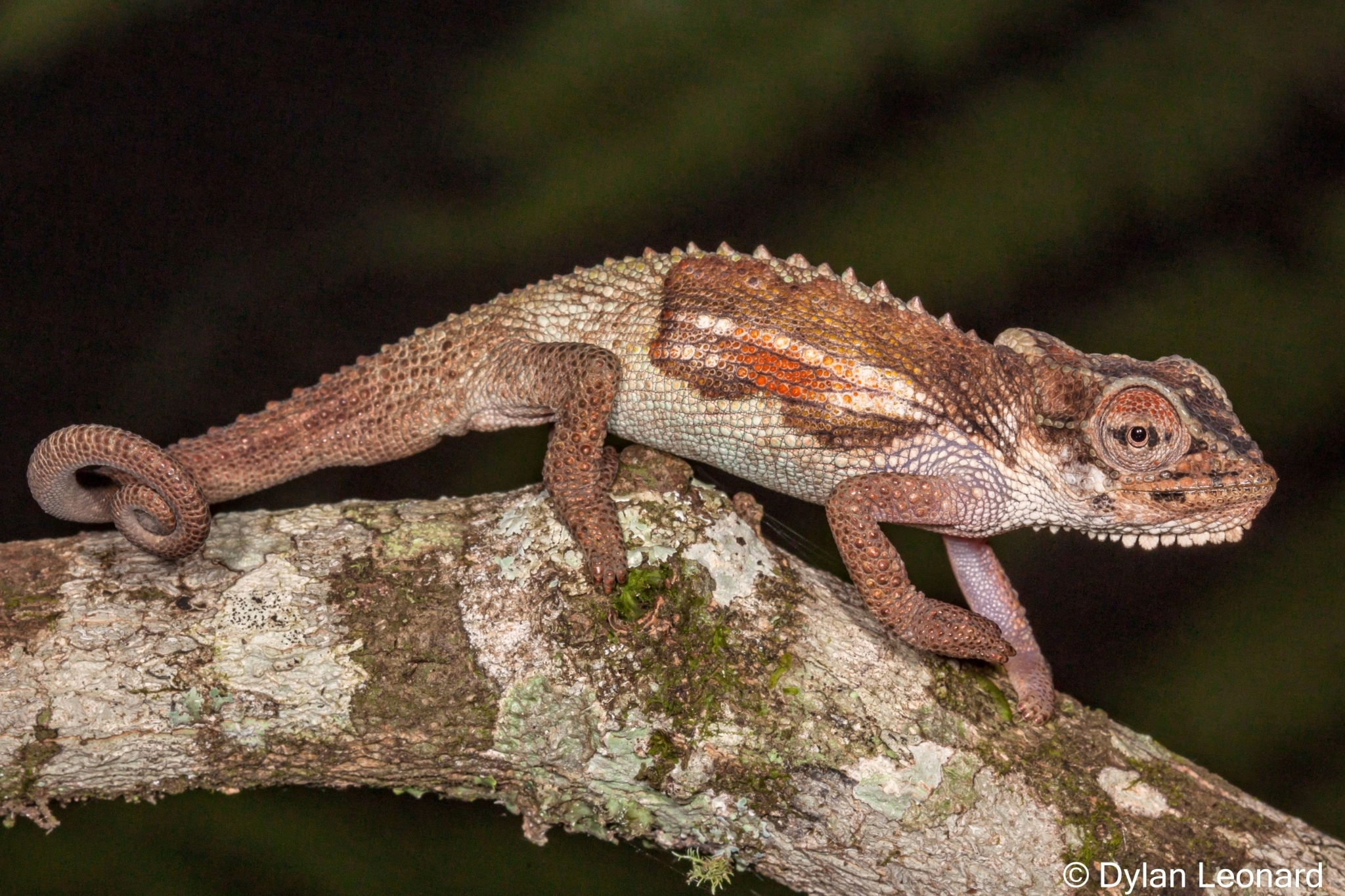

Conservation status
- Vulnerable (IUCN 3.1)
- CITES Appendix II (CITES)

Scientific classification
- Kingdom: Animalia
- Phylum: Chordata
- Class: Reptilia
- Order: Squamata
- Suborder: Iguania
- Family: Chamaeleonidae
- Genus: Bradypodion
- Species: B. ngomeense

Binomial name
- Bradypodion ngomeense Tilbury & Tolley, 2009

= Ngome dwarf chameleon =

Species of lizard

The Ngome dwarf chameleon (Bradypodion ngomeense) is a species of chameleon found in South Africa.
