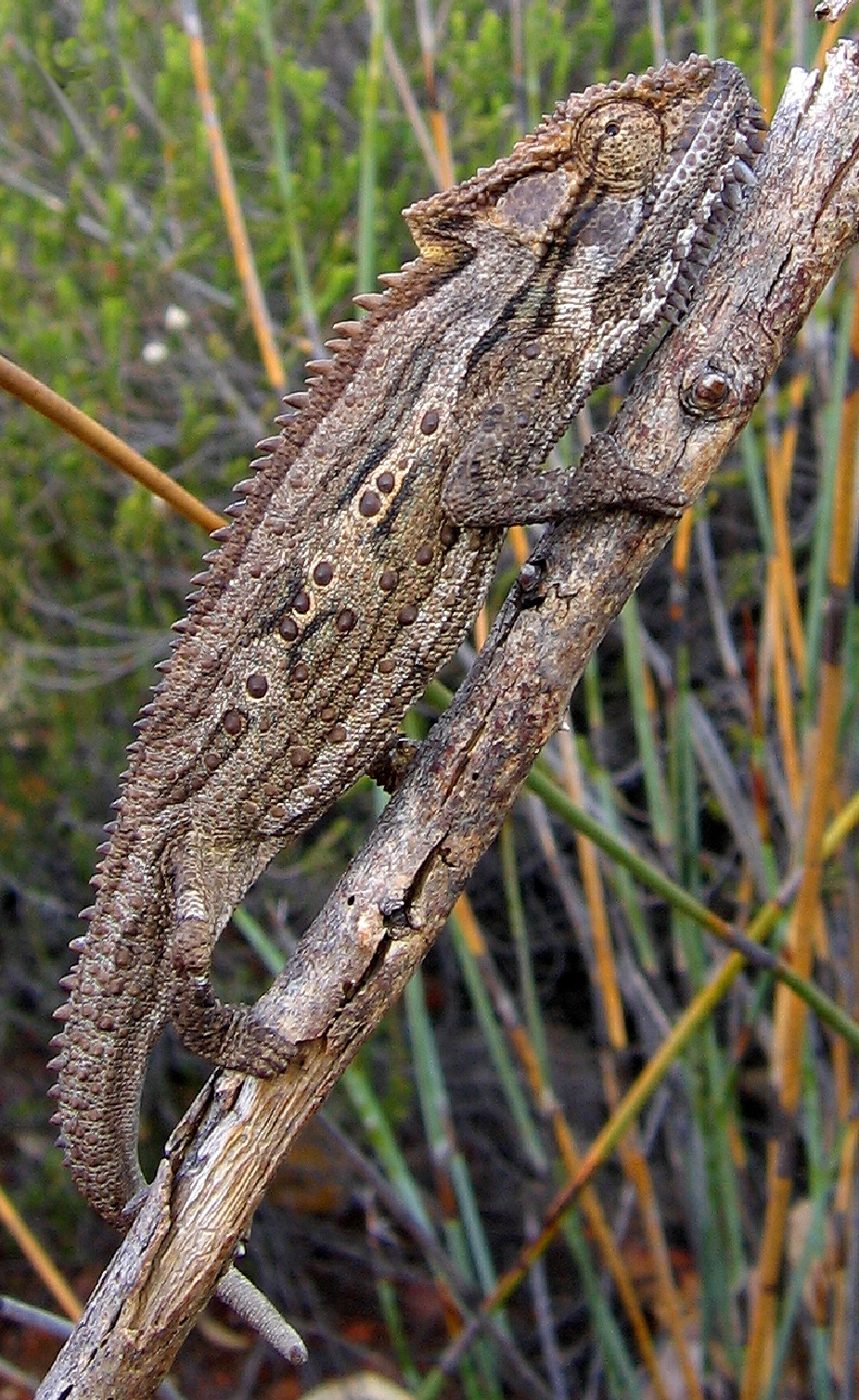

Conservation status
- Least Concern (IUCN 3.1)
- CITES Appendix II (CITES)

Scientific classification
- Kingdom: Animalia
- Phylum: Chordata
- Class: Reptilia
- Order: Squamata
- Suborder: Iguania
- Family: Chamaeleonidae
- Genus: Bradypodion
- Species: B. gutturale

Binomial name
- Bradypodion gutturale (Smith, 1849)
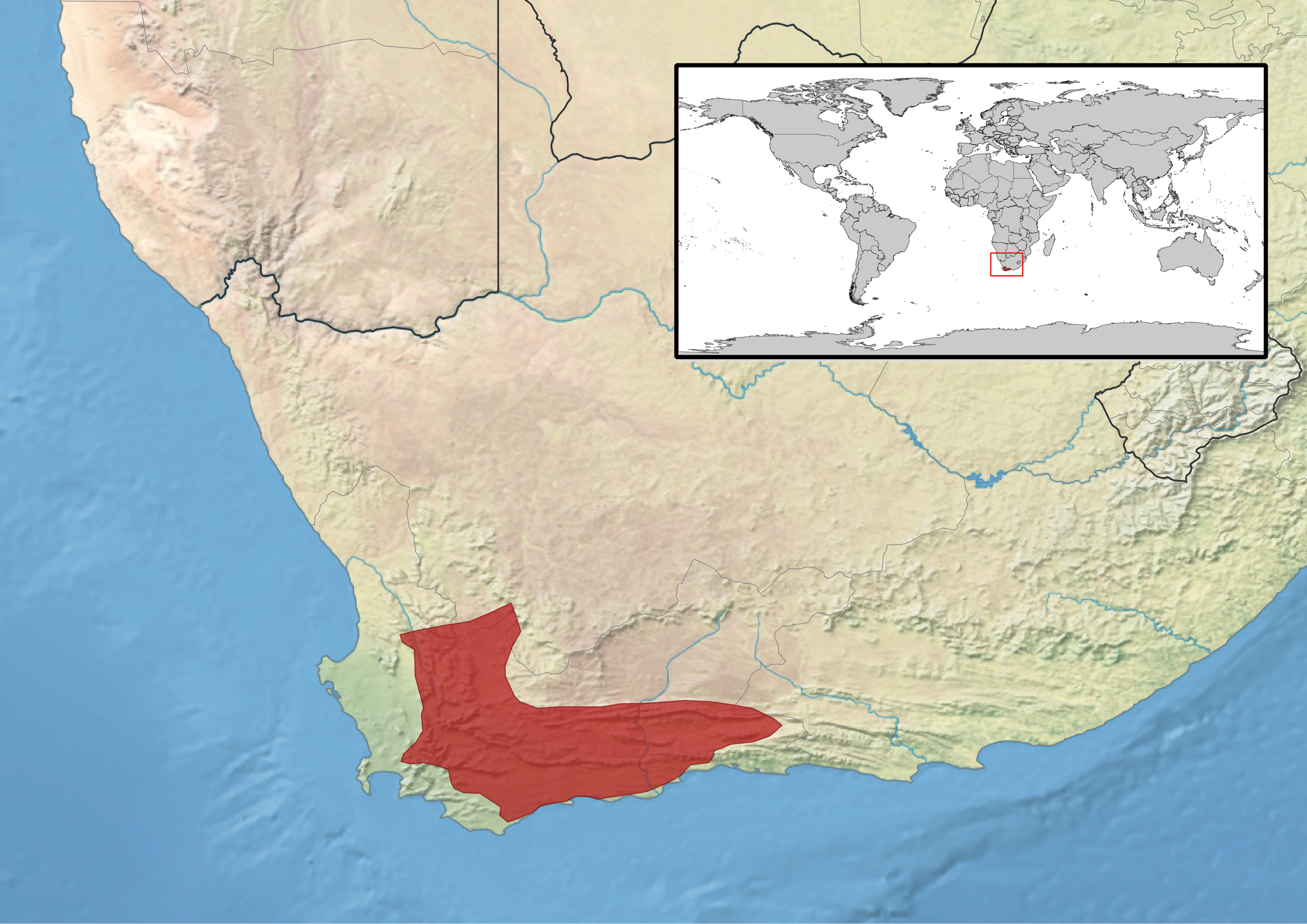

Synonyms
- Chamaeleo gutturalis Smith, 1849; Chamaeleon gutturalis Werner, 1911; Lophosaura gutturalis Power, 1932; Microsaura gutturalis Fitzsimons, 1943; Chamaeleo pumilus gutturalis Hillenius, 1959; Bradypodion gutturale Raw, 1976

= Robertson dwarf chameleon =

Species of lizard

The Robertson dwarf chameleon, also known as the Little Karoo dwarf chameleon, (Bradypodion gutturale) is a chameleon in the genus Bradypodion. It is found in the dry Fynbos and Renosterveld shrub vegetation, in the centre of the Western Cape province, South Africa.

== Description ==
A medium-sized dwarf chameleon, with a relatively robust build and a long prehensile tail, it can grow up to 15 cm in length. It is generally grey-olive in colour, but individuals have been found that vary.

== Natural range ==
This species occurs in the Little Karoo, and the surrounding mountain ranges, within the Western Cape, South Africa.

It is recorded as far west as the border of the Cederberg mountains, and as far east as Uniondale. In the south it occurs near the coast in the area of Robertson and on the Agulhas plain.

== Habitat ==
It prefers the fynbos vegetation, unlike some other species of dwarf chameleons that are forest-dwellers. It is particularly adapted to dry fynbos, renosterveld and is even found in the transition zones to arid succulent Karoo vegetation. DNA evidence suggests the Robertson chameleon may have diverged from the forest-dwellers several million years ago, coinciding with the retreat of the forests and the spread of dry fynbos.

== Sources ==
- Tolley K. and Burger M. 2007. Chameleons of Southern Africa. Struik, Cape Town
- Tolley, K.A. et al. 2006. Biogeographic patterns and phylogeography of dwarf chameleons (Bradypodion) in an African biodiversity hotspot. Molecular Ecology 15:781-793.
- The Dwarf Chameleon Project at Wildcliff Nature Reserve
