= Boosmansbos Wilderness Area =

Wilderness area in the Western Cape, South Africa

- Boosmansbos Wilderness Area, with Grootberg in the background
- Map of Western Cape
- Location: Western Cape Province, South Africa
- Nearest city: Heidelberg
- Coordinates: 33°55′S 20°52′E
- Area: 142 km^{2} (55 sq mi)

UNESCO World Heritage Site
- Part of: Cape Floral Region Protected Areas
- Criteria: Natural: (ix), (x)
- Reference: 1007bis
- Inscription: 2004 (28th Session)
- Extensions: 2015
- Boosmansbos Wilderness Area (Western Cape)

The Boosmansbos Wilderness Area of 142 km^{2} (55 sq mi) is situated 20 km (12 mi) north of Heidelberg in the eastern Langeberg mountain chain of the Western Cape Province, South Africa. Boosmansbos, i.e. 'angry man's forest', is named after a resident hermit of the early 19th century who had been known to scare youngsters who visited his apiaries.

The elevation reaches 1,637 m (5,371 ft) at Grootberg peak, located at the centre of the wilderness area. The tributaries of the Duiwenhoks River, which drain its southern slopes, tumble along precipitous gorges to 200 m (660 ft) above sea level on the southern perimeter. In the southwest the wilderness area encloses the Grootvadersbosch Nature Reserve of 250 ha (620 acres), the most western natural forest in South Africa.

The wilderness area conserves mountain fynbos and valley forest. Among the special fynbos plants conserved are Erica and everlasting species as well as the rare Langeberg rambling aloe. Important forest tree species occurring in the valleys are sickle-leaved yellowwood, stinkwood and red alder.

The area receives rain in any month of the year, although mid summer and mid winter are the driest, when hot bergwind conditions may occur. 64 km (40 mi) of footpaths allow access to the wilderness, among which a circular 27 km (17 mi) section which can be completed in two days.

== See also ==
- Protected areas of South Africa
- South African National Parks
