= List of reptiles of Lesotho =

This is a list of the reptile species recorded in Lesotho. There are 17 reptile species in Lesotho, of which 2 are classified as near threatened. This list is derived from the Reptile Database which lists species of reptile and includes those reptiles that have recently been classified as extinct (since 1500 AD). The taxonomy and naming of the individual species is based on those currently used by the Reptile Database as of 22 September 2011 and supplemented by the common names and taxonomy from the IUCN where no Reptile Database article was available.

The following tags are used to highlight species' conservation status as assessed by the International Union for Conservation of Nature:

EX	Extinct	No reasonable doubt that the last individual has died.
EW	Extinct in the wild	Known only to survive in captivity or as a naturalised populations well outside its previous range.
CR	Critically endangered	The species is in imminent risk of extinction in the wild.
EN	Endangered	The species is facing an extremely high risk of extinction in the wild.
VU	Vulnerable	The species is facing a high risk of extinction in the wild.
NT	Near threatened	The species does not meet any of the criteria that would categorise it as risking extinction but it is likely to do so in the future.

== Order: Squamata (snakes and lizards) ==
- Family: Gekkonidae (geckos)
  - Genus: Afroedura
    - Inland rock gecko (Afroedura karroica)
    - Drakensberg gecko (Afroedura nivaria)
- Family: Cordylidae (spinytail lizards)
  - Genus: Cordylus
    - Lang's crag lizard (Cordylus langi)
    - Drakensberg crag lizard (Cordylus melanotus)
      - Sub-species Cordylus melanotus subviridis
- Family: Lacertidae (true lizards)
  - Genus: Pedioplanis
    - Burchell's sand lizard (Pedioplanis burchelli)
  - Genus: Trachylepis
    - Montane speckled skink (Trachylepis punctatissima)
  - Genus: Tropidosaura
    - Cottrell's mountain lizard (Tropidosaura cottrelli) NT
    - Essex's mountain lizard (Tropidosaura essexi) NT
- Family: Colubridae
  - Genus: Dasypeltis
    - Common egg-eater (Dasypeltis scabra)
- Family: Lamprophiidae
  - Genus: Lycodonomorphus
    - Common brown water snake (Lycodonomorphus rufulus)
      - Sub-species Lycodonomorphus rufulus mlanjensis
  - Genus: Montaspis
    - Cream-spotted mountain snake (Montaspis gilvomaculata)
  - Genus: Prosymna
    - Sundevall's shovel-snout (Prosymna sundevalli)
  - Genus: Psammophylax
    - Spotted skaapsteker (Psammophylax rhombeatus)
- Family: Elapidae
  - Genus: Hemachatus
    - Rinkhals (Hemachatus haemachatus)
  - Genus: Naja
    - Western barred spitting cobra (Naja nigricincta)
      - Sub-species Naja nigricincta woodi
    - Cape cobra (Naja nivea)
- Family: Viperidae (adders and vipers)
  - Genus: Bitis
    - Mountain adder (Bitis atropos)

== See also ==
- List of chordate orders
- List of regional reptiles lists
