= Oyster blenny =

Oyster blenny may refer to:

- Hypleurochilus aequipinnis
- Hypleurochilus pseudoaequipinnis
- Omobranchus anolius
