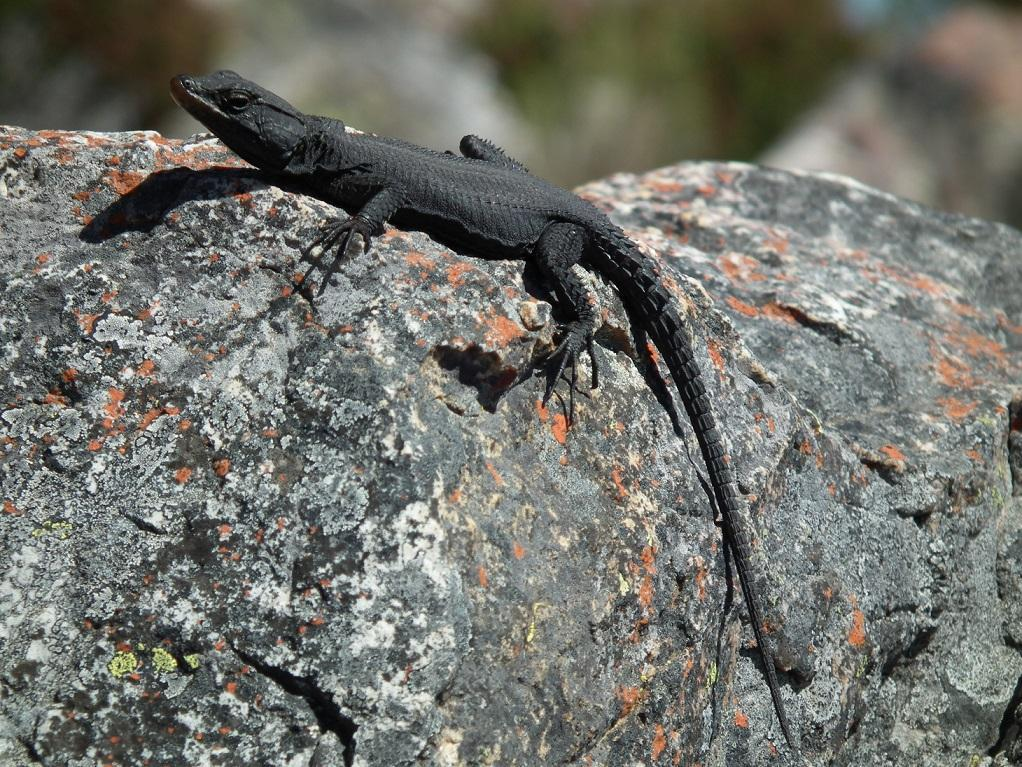

Conservation status
- Least Concern (IUCN 3.1)

Scientific classification
- Kingdom: Animalia
- Phylum: Chordata
- Class: Reptilia
- Order: Squamata
- Suborder: Scinciformata
- Infraorder: Scincomorpha
- Family: Cordylidae
- Genus: Hemicordylus
- Species: H. capensis

Binomial name
- Hemicordylus capensis (Smith, 1838)

Synonyms
- Cordylus capensis; Pseudocordylus capensis; Hemicordylus robertsi

= Hemicordylus capensis =

Cape Cliff Lizard

Species of lizard

The Cape Cliff Lizard (Hemicordylus capensis) is a lizard species endemic to the Cape Fold Belt of southern South Africa.

== Description ==
The maximum snout-to-vent length is about 76 mm. Like its sister species Hemicordylus nebulosus, it has gracile features, with a phenotype described as intermediate between typical Cordylus and the larger, more robust Pseudocordylus. They have long limbs, and long slender digits. Some populations are melanistic and sexually dichromatic.

== Habits ==
Their specialized adaptation to steep rock faces is believed to have favoured their agility and lightly armored anatomy. They give live birth to one to three young.
