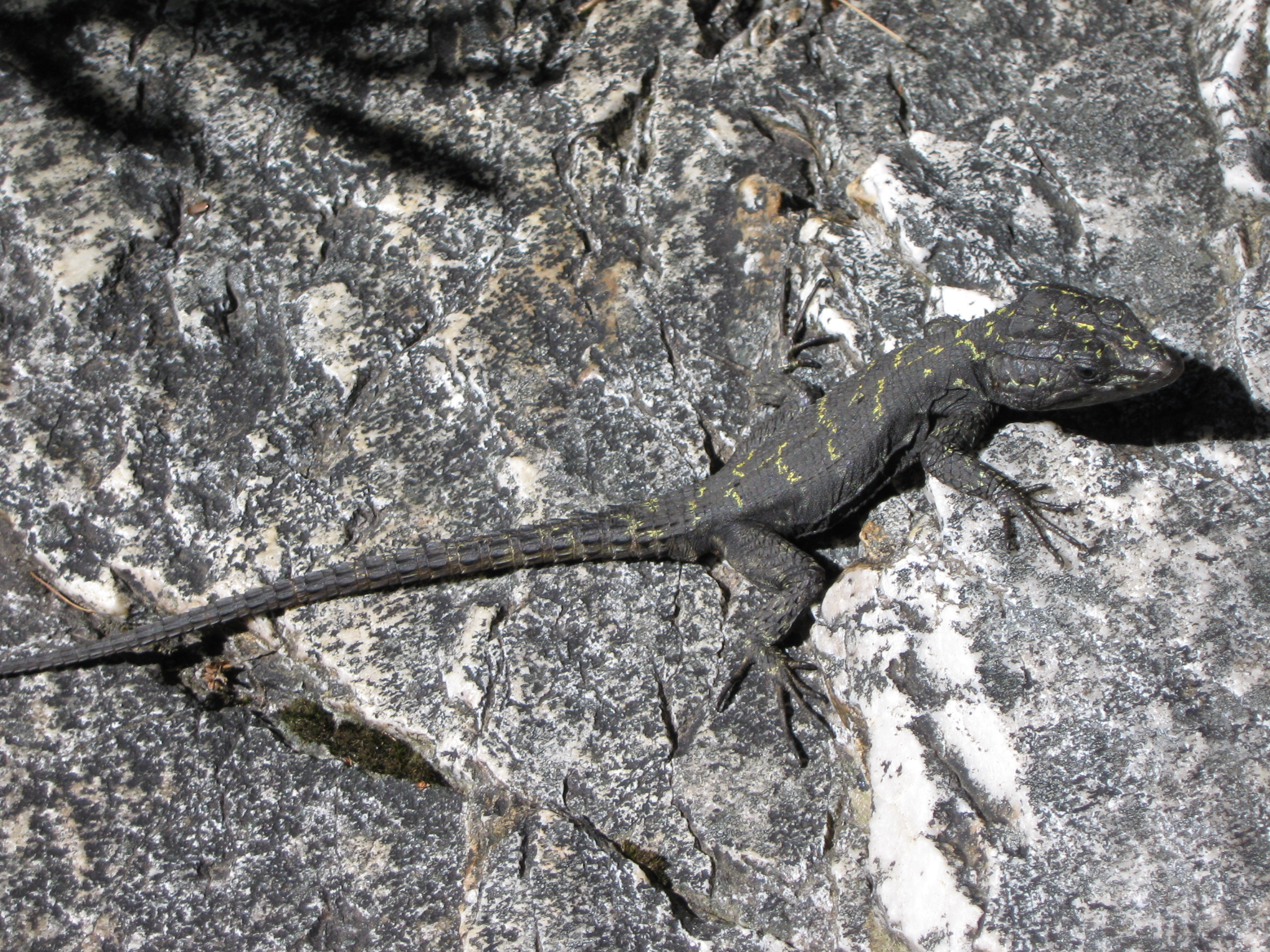
- H. capensis in the Hottentots-Holland

Scientific classification
- Domain: Eukaryota
- Kingdom: Animalia
- Phylum: Chordata
- Class: Reptilia
- Order: Squamata
- Family: Cordylidae
- Genus: Hemicordylus; Smith, 1838

= Hemicordylus =

Genus of lizards

Hemicordylus, the false girdled lizards, is a genus comprising two lizard species endemic to the Cape Fold Belt of southern South Africa.

== Description ==
Their maximum snout-to-vent length is about 76 mm. They have gracile features, with a phenotype which is described as intermediate between typical Cordylus and the larger, more robust Pseudocordylus. They have long limbs, and long slender digits. Some populations are melanistic and sexually dichromatic. The melanistic populations have been shown to be ecotypes rather than relics in the related genus Karusasaurus.

== Habits ==
Their specialized adaptation to steep rock faces, is believed to have favoured their agility and lightly armored anatomy. They give live birth to 1–3 young.

== Species ==
- Hemicordylus capensis (Smith, 1838) – false girdled lizard
- Hemicordylus nebulosus (Mouton & van Wyk, 1995)
