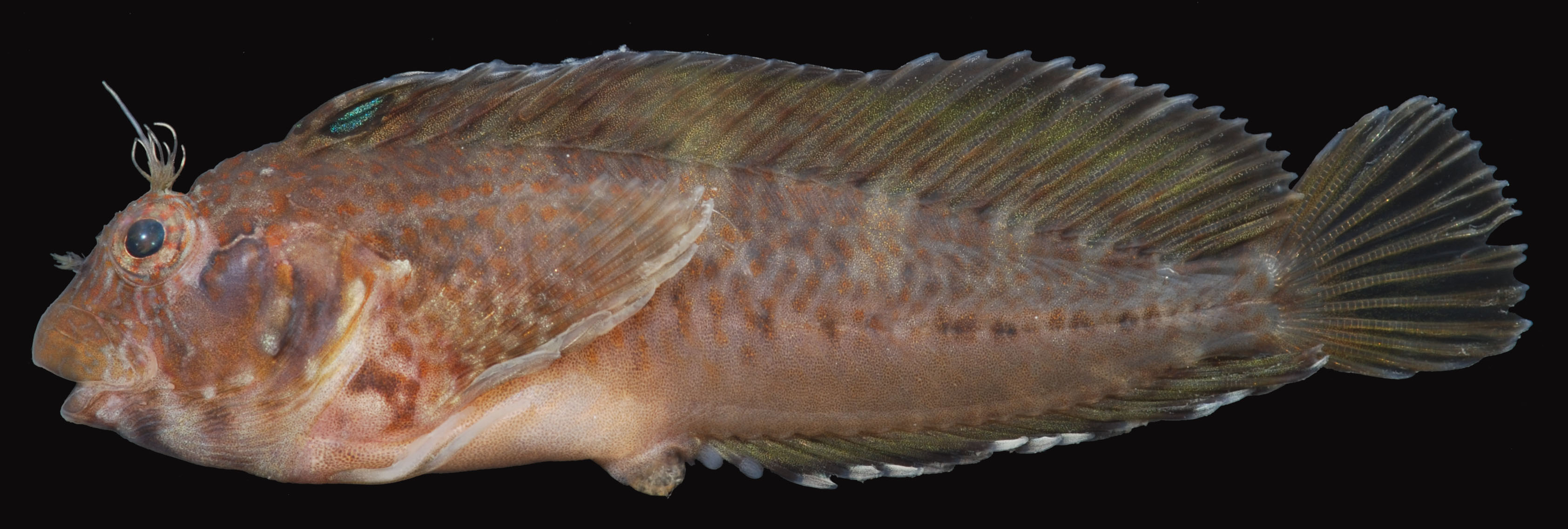

Conservation status
- Least Concern (IUCN 3.1)

Scientific classification
- Kingdom: Animalia
- Phylum: Chordata
- Class: Actinopterygii
- Order: Blenniiformes
- Family: Blenniidae
- Genus: Hypleurochilus
- Species: H. geminatus

Binomial name
- Hypleurochilus geminatus (W. W. Wood, 1825)

Synonyms
- Blennius geminatus Wood, 1825

= Hypleurochilus geminatus =

Species of fish

Hypleurochilus geminatus, the crested blenny, is a species of combtooth blenny found in the western Atlantic ocean. This species grows to a length of 10 centimetres (3.9 in) TL.

== Location ==
Hypleurochilus geminatusis found along the coastal waters of the Northern Gulf of Mexico on up to the Western part of the Atlantic Ocean, from Cuba north to New Jersey. The crested blenny is sometimes reef associated in the subtropical climates. They live on hard bottoms such as oyster reefs and rock areas in estuaries.

== Morphology ==
Hypleurochilus geminatus has a morphology consistent with most Blenniids. It is a small, slender fish with eyes on top of its head and a ventral mouth with a non protractile upper jaw. It also has an elongated body that is laterally compressed with long anal and dorsal fins with spines that are often flexible. The body and fins are dark brown with spots of marbling. The female has square dark blotches and a lighter body. Breeding males develop a brightly colored chin and throat. The crested blenny also has fleshy tabs on its forehead that are called cirri. These cirri are long in males and short in females. They can also have enlarged canine teeth present on both sides of one or both jaws. The crested blenny also lacks scales. Crested blennies use their fine and flexible teeth to pick invertebrates from the substrate.

== Reproduction ==
Hypleurochilus geminatus is oviparous and experience district pairing. Their eggs are demersal and adhesive and attach to the substrate with filamentous adhesive pads or pedestals. The larvae are planktonic and are often found in shallow, coastal waters.

== Conservation ==
There are no known conservation measures in place for this species and the IUCN classify it as Least Concern.
