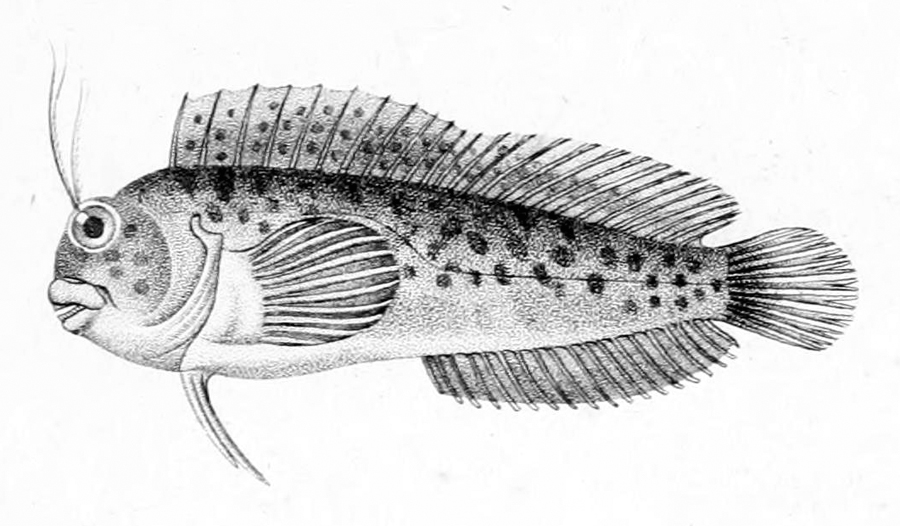
- (H. fissicornis)

Scientific classification
- Kingdom: Animalia
- Phylum: Chordata
- Class: Actinopterygii
- Order: Blenniiformes
- Family: Blenniidae
- Subfamily: Salariinae
- Genus: Hypleurochilus; T. N. Gill, 1861

Type species
- Blennius multifilis Girard, 1858

= Hypleurochilus =

Genus of fishes

Hypleurochilus is a genus of combtooth blennies found throughout the Atlantic Ocean.

== Species ==
There are currently 11 recognized species in this genus:

- Hypleurochilus aequipinnis (Günther, 1861) (Oyster blenny)
- Hypleurochilus bananensis (Poll, 1959)
- Hypleurochilus bermudensis Beebe & Tee-Van, 1933 (Barred blenny)
- Hypleurochilus brasil Pinheiro, Gasparini & Rangel, 2013
- Hypleurochilus caudovittatus Bath, 1994 (Zebratail blenny)
- Hypleurochilus fissicornis (Quoy & Gaimard, 1824)
- Hypleurochilus geminatus (W. W. Wood, 1825) (Crested blenny)
- Hypleurochilus langi (Fowler, 1923)
- Hypleurochilus multifilis (Girard, 1858) (Featherduster blenny)
- Hypleurochilus pseudoaequipinnis Bath, 1994
- Hypleurochilus springeri J. E. Randall, 1966 (Orange-spotted blenny)
