= Herbert Lang =

German zoologist (1879–1957)

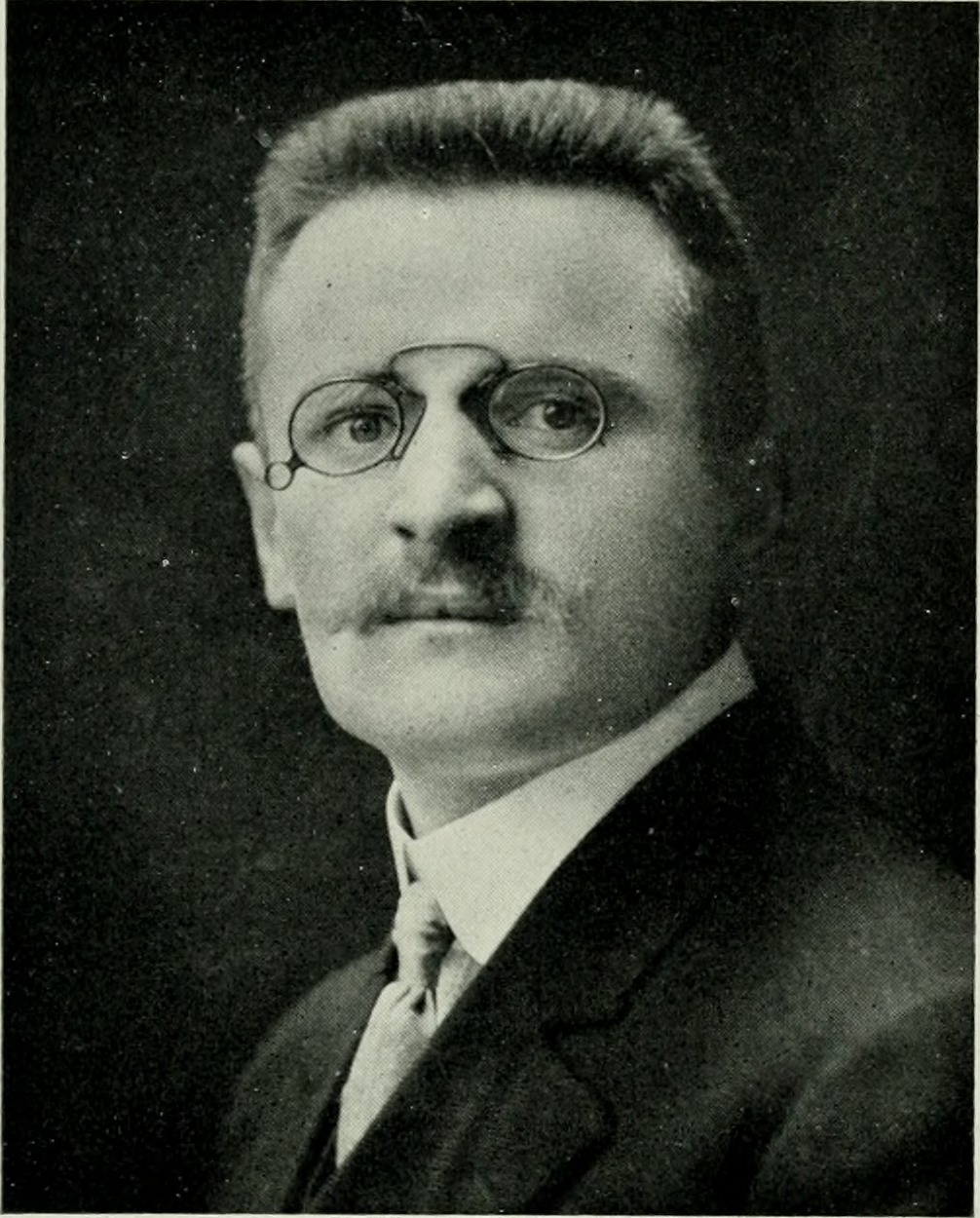
Herbert Lang

Herbert Lang (March 24, 1879 – May 29, 1957) was a German zoologist.

Lang was born in Oehringen, Württemberg, Germany. His childhood interest in nature led to a job as a taxidermist and later work at the natural history museum at the University of Zurich.

In 1903, Lang, then 24, emigrated to the U.S. and began working at the American Museum of Natural History. He made his first field expedition to Kenya in 1906, returning with 178 mammal and 232 avian samples.

After his successful expedition, Lang was put in charge of the museum's Congo expedition, accompanied by ornithologist James Chapin. Lang led the expedition, until the outbreak of World War I in 1914. In 1919, he became the assistant curator in the museum's Department of Mammalogy.

Lang returned to Africa, accompanied by Rudyerd Boulton, in 1925 and collected 1,200 mammal specimens, including the rare giant sable antelope. In 1935, he married the widow of a close friend. He died in Pretoria in 1957.

A species of African lizard, Pseudocordylus langi, is named in his honor, as is the combtooth blenny, Hypleurochilus langi
