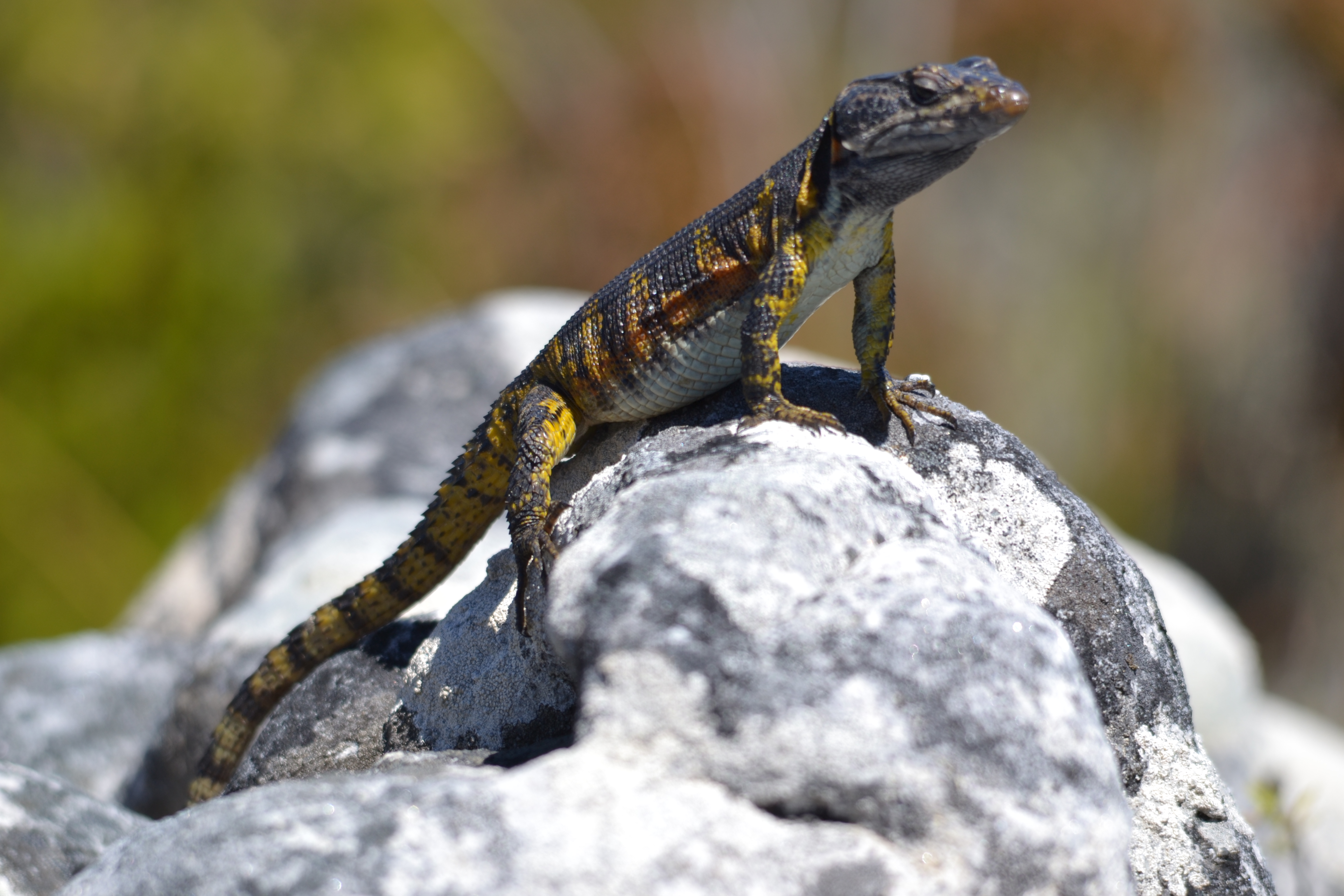
- Pseudocordylus microlepidotus microlepidotus on Table Mountain

Conservation status
- Least Concern (IUCN 3.1)

Scientific classification
- Domain: Eukaryota
- Kingdom: Animalia
- Phylum: Chordata
- Class: Reptilia
- Order: Squamata
- Family: Cordylidae
- Genus: Pseudocordylus
- Species: P. microlepidotus

Binomial name
- Pseudocordylus microlepidotus (Cuvier, 1829)

= Pseudocordylus microlepidotus =

Species of lizard

Pseudocordylus microlepidotus, or the Cape crag lizard, is a species of lizard native to shrublands and grasslands of South Africa. Three subspecies have been named: Pseudocordylus microlepidotus microlepidotus, Pseudocordylus microlepidotus fasciatus, and Pseudocordylus microlepidotus namaquensis. The species' gestation type is ovoviviparous. The species is protected under Convention on International Trade in Endangered Species of Wild Fauna and Flora (CITES).

== Description ==
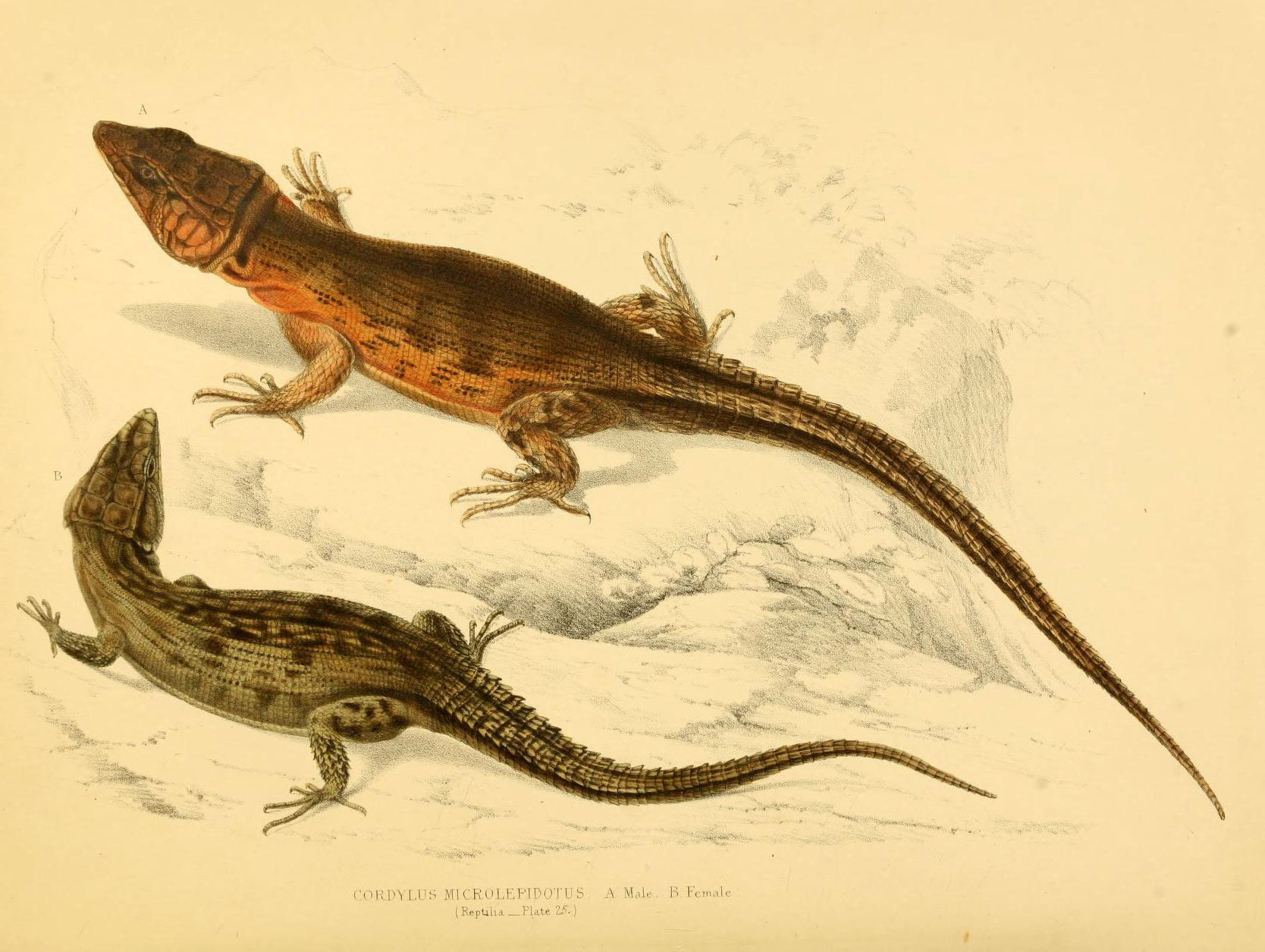
Male and female.

The two sexes are similar in size; however, males have larger heads and develop more glands than females. The sexes begin to differentiate before sexual maturity.
