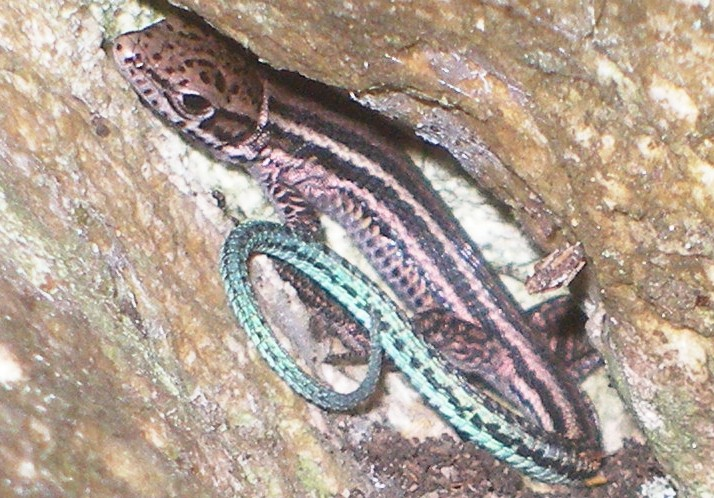

Conservation status
- Least Concern (IUCN 3.1)

Scientific classification
- Kingdom: Animalia
- Phylum: Chordata
- Class: Reptilia
- Order: Squamata
- Family: Lacertidae
- Genus: Tropidosaura
- Species: T. gularis

Binomial name
- Tropidosaura gularis Hewitt, 1927

= Tropidosaura gularis =

Species of lizard

Tropidosaura gularis, also known commonly as the Cape mountain lizard and the yellow-striped mountain lizard, is a species of lizard in the family Lacertidae. The species is endemic to South Africa.

== Habitat ==
The preferred natural habitat of T. gularis is shrubland.

== Description ==
Adults of T. gularis have a snout-to-vent length (SVL) of 5–6 cm (2.0–2.4 in).

== Diet ==
T. gularis is insectivorous, preying predominantly on bees and flies.

== Reproduction ==
T. gularis is oviparous. An adult female may lay a clutch of 4–8 eggs, each of which measures on average 11.5 x 7.5 mm (0.45 x 0.30 in).
