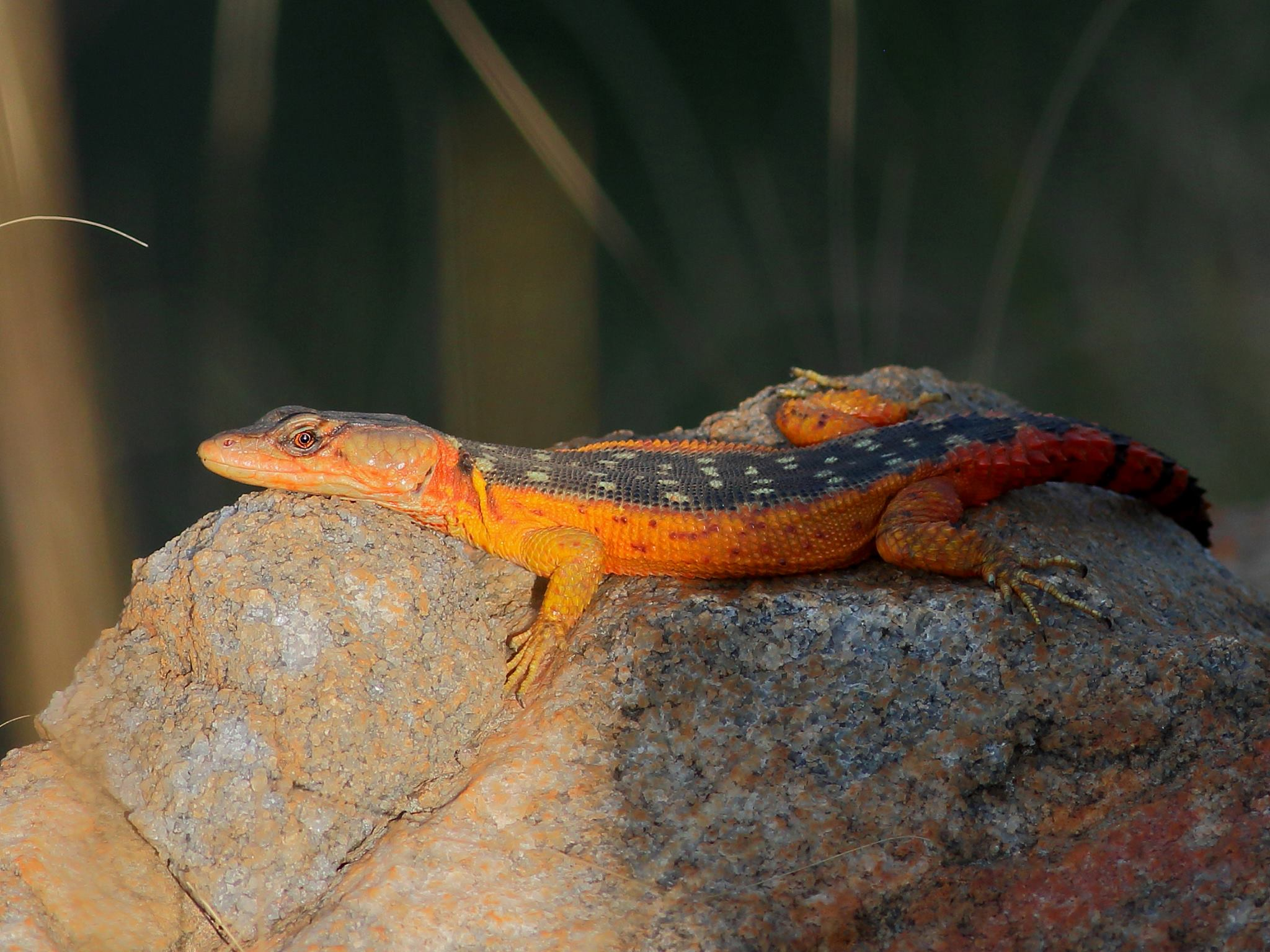
- P. melanotus in the Magaliesberg

Conservation status
- Least Concern (IUCN 3.1)

Scientific classification
- Kingdom: Animalia
- Phylum: Chordata
- Class: Reptilia
- Order: Squamata
- Family: Cordylidae
- Genus: Pseudocordylus
- Species: P. melanotus

Binomial name
- Pseudocordylus melanotus (A. Smith, 1838)

Synonyms
- Cordylus melanotus Smith, 1838; Pseudocordylus microlepidotus melanotus – Loveridge, 1944; Pseudocordylus melanotus melanotus – De Waal, 1978; Pseudocordylus melanotus melanotus – Visser, 1984; Cordylus melanotus – Frost et al., 2001; Pseudocordylus melanotus – Stanley et al., 2011

= Pseudocordylus melanotus =

Species of lizard

Pseudocordylus melanotus, also known as the common crag lizard or Highveld crag lizard, is a species of lizard found in Eswatini, Lesotho, and South Africa. Pseudocordylus subviridis is considered a distinct species by the Reptile Database, but a subspecies of Pseudocordylus melanotus by IUCN.

Pseudocordylus melanotus an ovoviviparous lizard, tolerant of temperatures no lower than –5 °C, and consequently occurring on rocky outcrops, hills and mountains throughout southern Africa. Various subspecies are found in the inland mountains of the Eastern Cape (Amatole–Great Winterberg) and Cape Fold Mountains, the Natal and Transvaal Drakensberg and foothills, Lesotho and Eswatini with an isolated population at Suikerbosrand, and also at the Magaliesberg. The type specimen was collected by the Scots zoologist Andrew Smith in 1838 in the hills between the main branches of the Orange River east of Philippolis, Orange Free State.
