= Hypleurochilus caudovittatus =

Conservation status
- Least Concern (IUCN 3.1)

Scientific classification
- Kingdom: Animalia
- Phylum: Chordata
- Class: Actinopterygii
- Order: Blenniiformes
- Family: Blenniidae
- Genus: Hypleurochilus
- Species: H. caudovittatus

Binomial name
- Hypleurochilus caudovittatus Bath, 1994

Species of fish

Hypleurochilus caudovittatus, the zebratail blenny, is a species of combtooth blenny found in the western central Atlantic ocean, in the Gulf of Mexico off the western coast of Florida.
