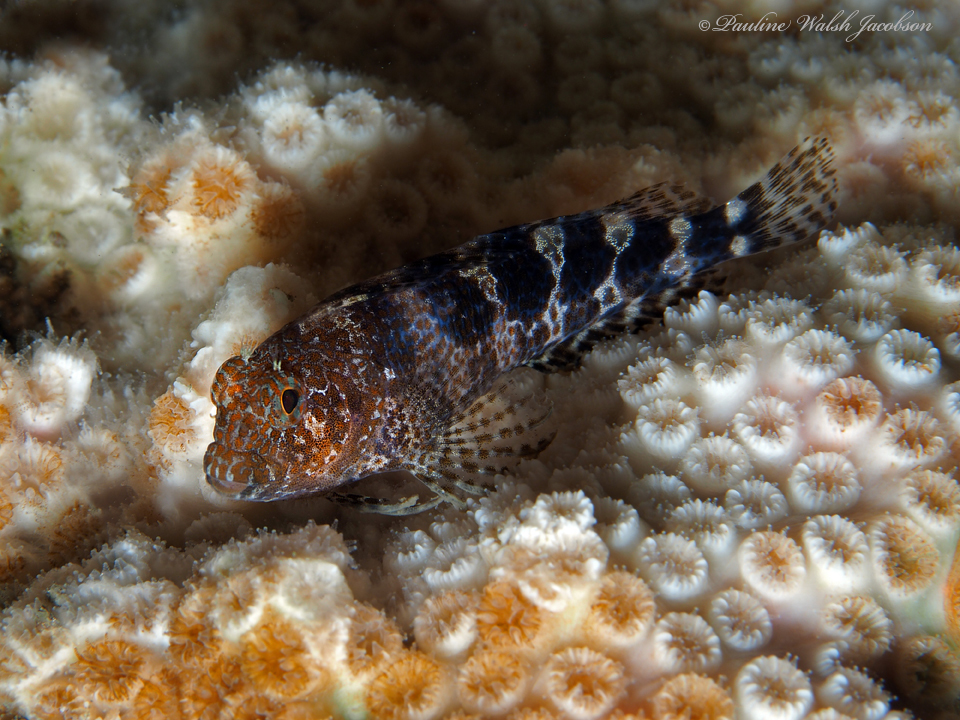

Conservation status
- Least Concern (IUCN 3.1)

Scientific classification
- Kingdom: Animalia
- Phylum: Chordata
- Class: Actinopterygii
- Order: Blenniiformes
- Family: Blenniidae
- Genus: Hypleurochilus
- Species: H. bermudensis

Binomial name
- Hypleurochilus bermudensis Beebe & Tee-Van, 1933

= Hypleurochilus bermudensis =

Species of fish

Hypleurochilus bermudensis, the barred blenny, is a species of combtooth blenny found in coral reefs in the western Atlantic Ocean. This species grows to a length of 10 centimetres (3.9 in) TL.
