= Hypleurochilus multifilis =

Conservation status
- Least Concern (IUCN 3.1)

Scientific classification
- Kingdom: Animalia
- Phylum: Chordata
- Class: Actinopterygii
- Order: Blenniiformes
- Family: Blenniidae
- Genus: Hypleurochilus
- Species: H. multifilis

Binomial name
- Hypleurochilus multifilis (Girard, 1858)

Synonyms
- Blennius multifilis Girard, 1858

Species of fish

Hypleurochilus multifilis, the featherduster blenny, is a species of combtooth blenny found in the western Atlantic ocean, in the Gulf of Mexico around Texas, USA. Its distribution extends from central Florida to Tabasco, Mexico.
