= Hypleurochilus brasil =

Scientific classification
- Kingdom: Animalia
- Phylum: Chordata
- Class: Actinopterygii
- Order: Blenniiformes
- Family: Blenniidae
- Genus: Hypleurochilus
- Species: H. brasil

Binomial name
- Hypleurochilus brasil Pinheiro, Gasparini & Rangel, 2013

Species of fish

Hypleurochilus brasil is a species of combtooth blenny from the subfamily Salarinae of the family Blenniidae. It is endemic to the reefs around Trindade and Martin Vaz off Brazil in the western South Atlantic Ocean.

== Description ==
Hypleurochilus brasil is distinguished from other species in the genus Hypleurochilus by having 3 rays in the pelvic fin, an average of 123 spines and 12 soft rays in the dorsal fin and 2 spines and 15-16 rays in the anal fin. It also lacks any blackened stripes and has a green or white nape and many, small red spots along its body, these spots decrease in size towards the tail. In life the body of this blenny is translucent, tinted faintly brown in juveniles and orange in adults, the adults having pae, transverse bars on the head and close to the tail. It is a small species which grows to a maximum recorded standard length of 3.1 centimetres (1.2 in).

== Distribution and habitat ==
Hypleurochilus brasil occurs only off the Brazilian archipelago of Trindade and Martin Vaz in the South Atlantic Ocean, some 1,160 kilometres (720 miles) from the mainland. It was found at depths of 3–15 metres (9.8–49.2 ft), either solitarily or in small groups and was normally recorded in small holes associated with sponges and sea urchins among rocky reefs.

== Etymology ==
The specific name brasil is the Portuguese spelling of Brazil, the country's name being derived from the red coloured wood of the tree Caesalpinia echinate and so the name refers both to the country of its origin and to the red spots along this fish's body.
