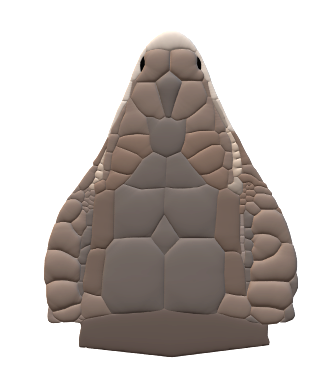
- dorsal view of head

Conservation status
- Least Concern (IUCN 3.1)

Scientific classification
- Kingdom: Animalia
- Phylum: Chordata
- Class: Reptilia
- Order: Squamata
- Suborder: Scinciformata
- Infraorder: Scincomorpha
- Family: Cordylidae
- Genus: Pseudocordylus
- Species: P. spinosus

Binomial name
- Pseudocordylus spinosus Fitzsimons, 1947

= Spiny crag lizard =

Species of lizard

The spiny crag lizard or prickly girdled lizard (Pseudocordylus spinosus) is a species of lizard in the family Cordylidae.

== Range ==
It is found in the northern Drakensberg escarpment of Lesotho and adjacent South Africa, besides a population in southern KwaZulu-Natal.
