= Tropidosaura montana =

Conservation status
- Least Concern (IUCN 3.1)

Scientific classification
- Kingdom: Animalia
- Phylum: Chordata
- Class: Reptilia
- Order: Squamata
- Family: Lacertidae
- Genus: Tropidosaura
- Species: T. montana

Binomial name
- Tropidosaura montana (Gray, 1831)

Synonyms
- Lacerta (Tropidosaurus) montanus Gray in Griffith, 1831; Tropidosaura montana — A.M.C. Duméril & Bibron, 1839

Species of lizard

Tropidosaura montana, also known commonly as the common mountain lizard and the green-striped mountain lizard, is a species of lizard in the family Lacertidae. The species is endemic to South Africa. There are three recognized subspecies.

== Habitat ==
The preferred natural habitats of T. montana are grassland and shrubland.

== Description ==
Adults of T. montana have a snout-to-vent length (SVL) of 4.5–5.5 cm (1.8–2.2 in). Compared to other species of its genus, the head is shorter, and the tail is longer.

== Behavior ==
T. montana is terrestrial.

== Reproduction ==
T. montana is oviparous. An adult female may lay a clutch of 4–5 eggs, each egg measuring on average 10.5 x 6.5 mm (0.41 x 0.26 in). Eggs are laid in November and hatch in a little more than a month. Each hatchling has a total length (including tail) of about 6 cm (2.4 in).

== Subspecies ==
Three subspecies are recognized as being valid, including the nominotypical subspecies.

- Tropidosaura montana montana (Gray, 1831)

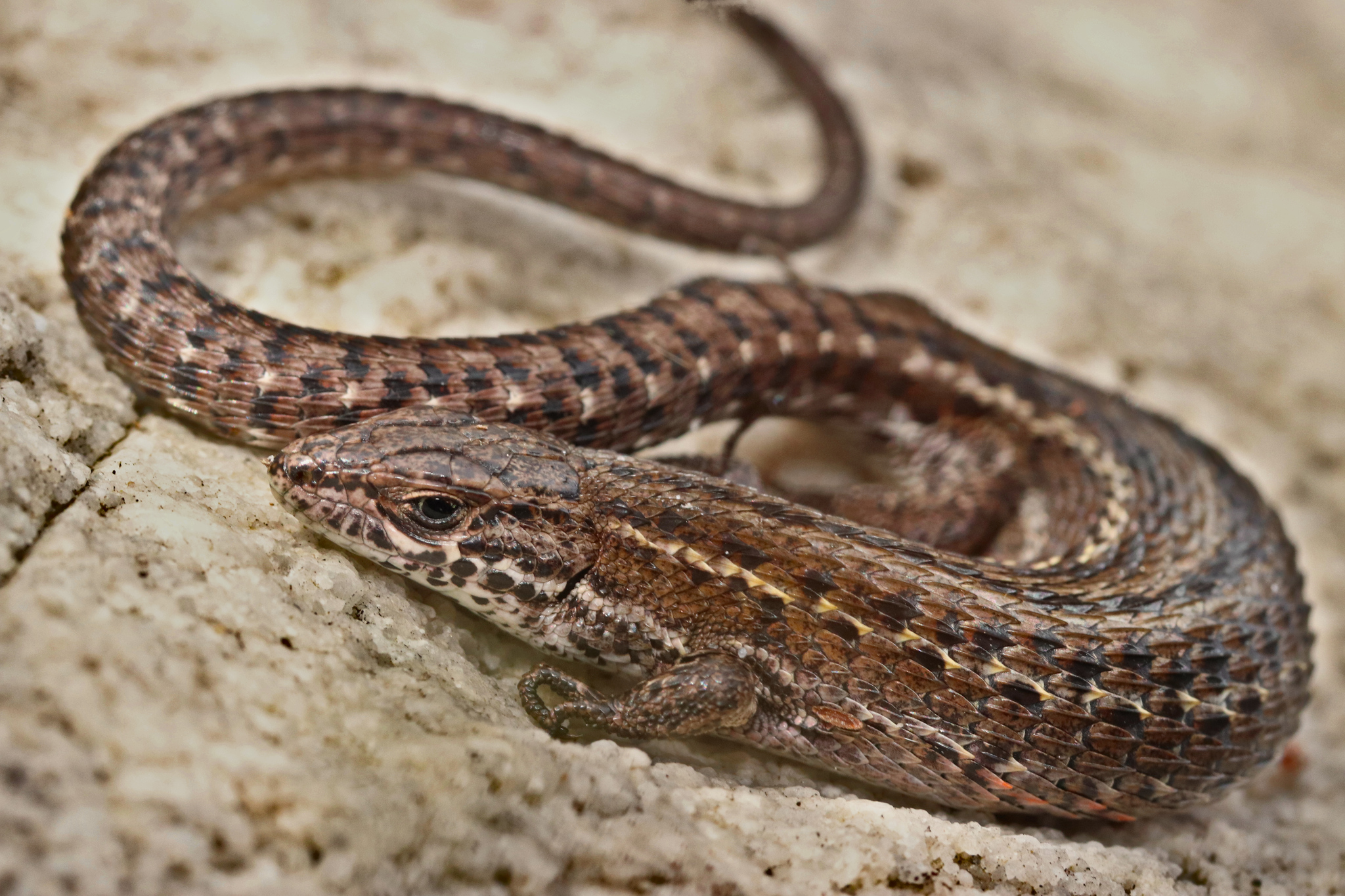
T. m. montana

- Tropidosaura montana natalensis V. FitzSimons, 1947
- Tropidosaura montana rangeri Hewitt, 1926

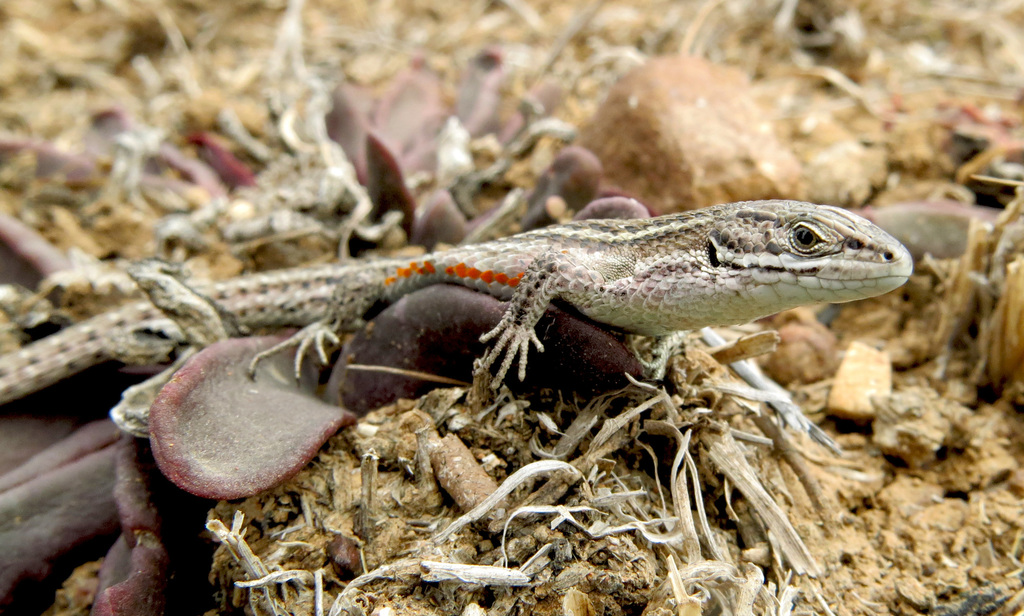
T. m. rangeri white morph

Nota bene: A trinomial authority in parentheses indicates that the subspecies was originally described in a genus other than Tropidosaura.

== Etymology ==
The subspecific name, rangeri, is in honor of Gordon Ranger who collected the holotype.
