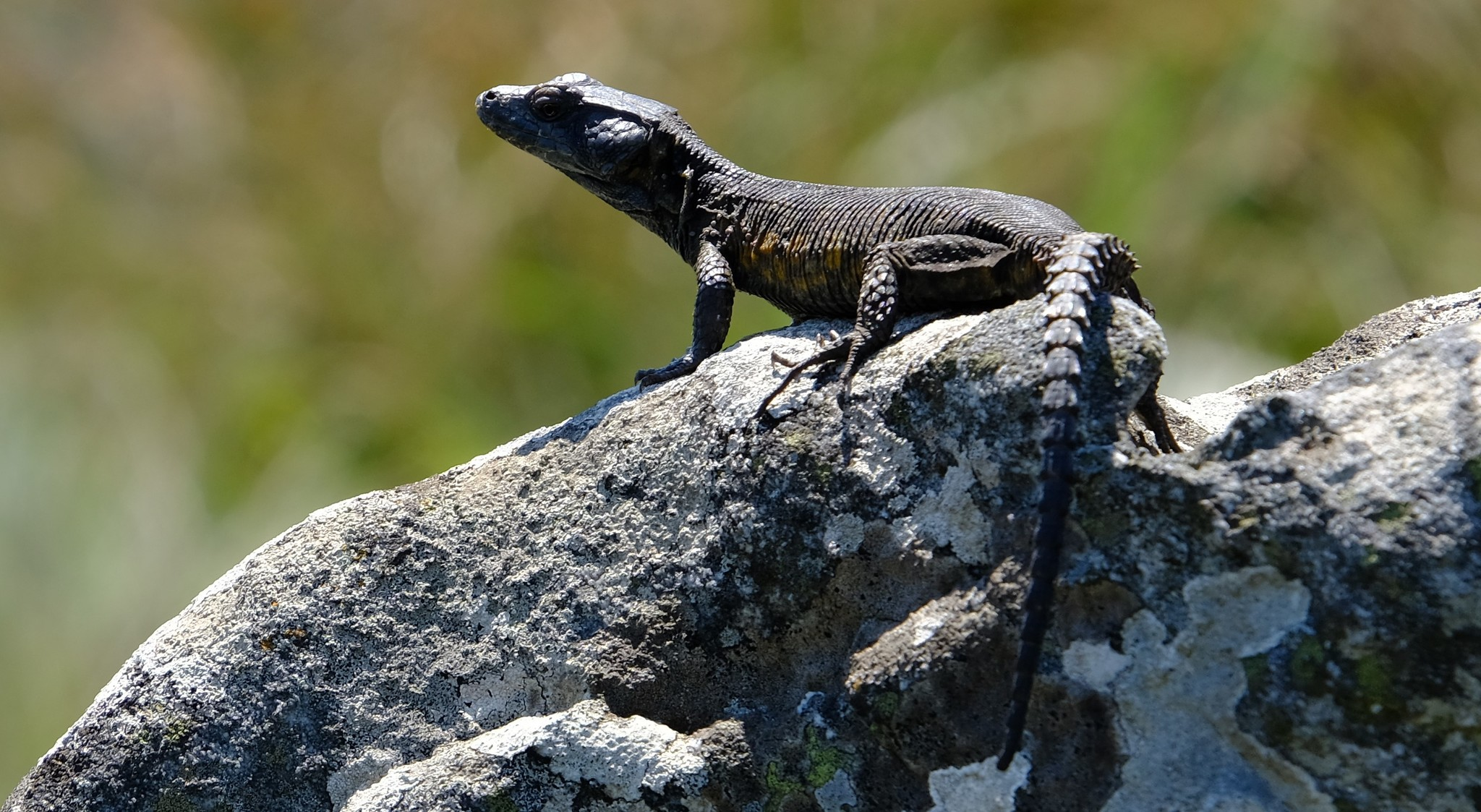

Conservation status
- Least Concern (IUCN 3.1)

Scientific classification
- Kingdom: Animalia
- Phylum: Chordata
- Class: Reptilia
- Order: Squamata
- Suborder: Scinciformata
- Infraorder: Scincomorpha
- Family: Cordylidae
- Genus: Pseudocordylus
- Species: P. transvaalensis

Binomial name
- Pseudocordylus transvaalensis FitzSimons, 1943

= Pseudocordylus transvaalensis =

Northern crag lizard

Species of lizard

Pseudocordylus transvaalensis (also known as the northern crag lizard) is a species of lizard in the family Cordylidae. It is a small lizard found in South Africa.
