= Hypleurochilus langi =

Conservation status
- Least Concern (IUCN 3.1)

Scientific classification
- Kingdom: Animalia
- Phylum: Chordata
- Class: Actinopterygii
- Division: Teleostei
- Order: Blenniiformes
- Family: Blenniidae
- Genus: Hypleurochilus
- Species: H. langi

Binomial name
- Hypleurochilus langi (Fowler, 1923)

Synonyms
- Blennius langi Fowler, 1923; Nypleurochilus langi (Fowler, 1923)

Species of fish

Hypleurochilus langi is a species of combtooth blenny found in the eastern Atlantic ocean, from Senegal to the mouth of the Congo River. This species grows to a length of 7 centimetres (2.8 in) SL. This blenny is euryhaline and it enters mouths of large rivers and occurs among mangroves, it prefers brackish water. The specific name of this blenny honours the German zoologist and taxidermist Herbert Lang (1879-1957) of the American Museum of Natural History, who helped to collect the type.
