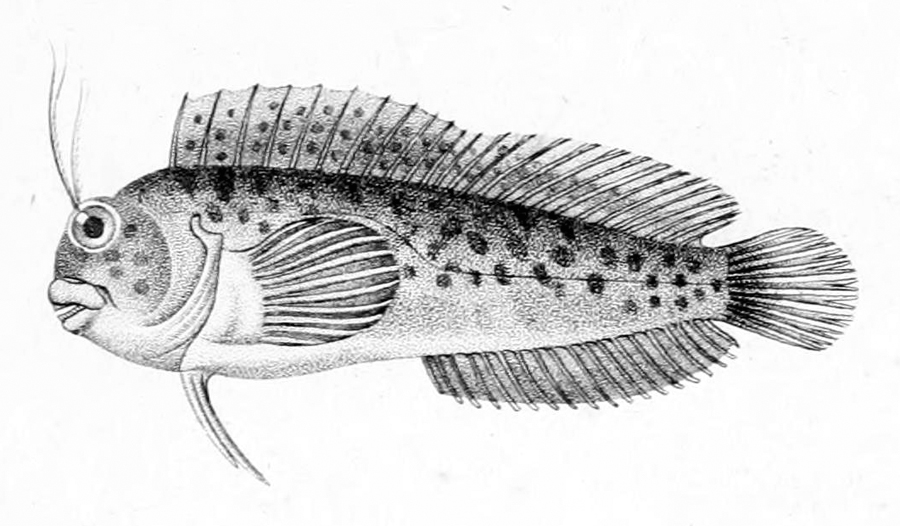

Conservation status
- Least Concern (IUCN 3.1)

Scientific classification
- Kingdom: Animalia
- Phylum: Chordata
- Class: Actinopterygii
- Order: Blenniiformes
- Family: Blenniidae
- Genus: Hypleurochilus
- Species: H. fissicornis

Binomial name
- Hypleurochilus fissicornis (Quoy & Gaimard, 1824)

Synonyms
- Blennius fissicornis Quoy & Gaimard, 1824; Blennius fucorum Valenciennes, 1836; Parablennius fucorum (Valenciennes, 1836); Blennius oceanicus Valenciennes, 1836

= Hypleurochilus fissicornis =

Species of fish

Hypleurochilus fissicornis is a species of combtooth blenny found in the Azores and southwest Atlantic ocean off eastern South America from Paraíba to Uruguay. This species grows to a length of 8.7 centimetres (3.4 in).
