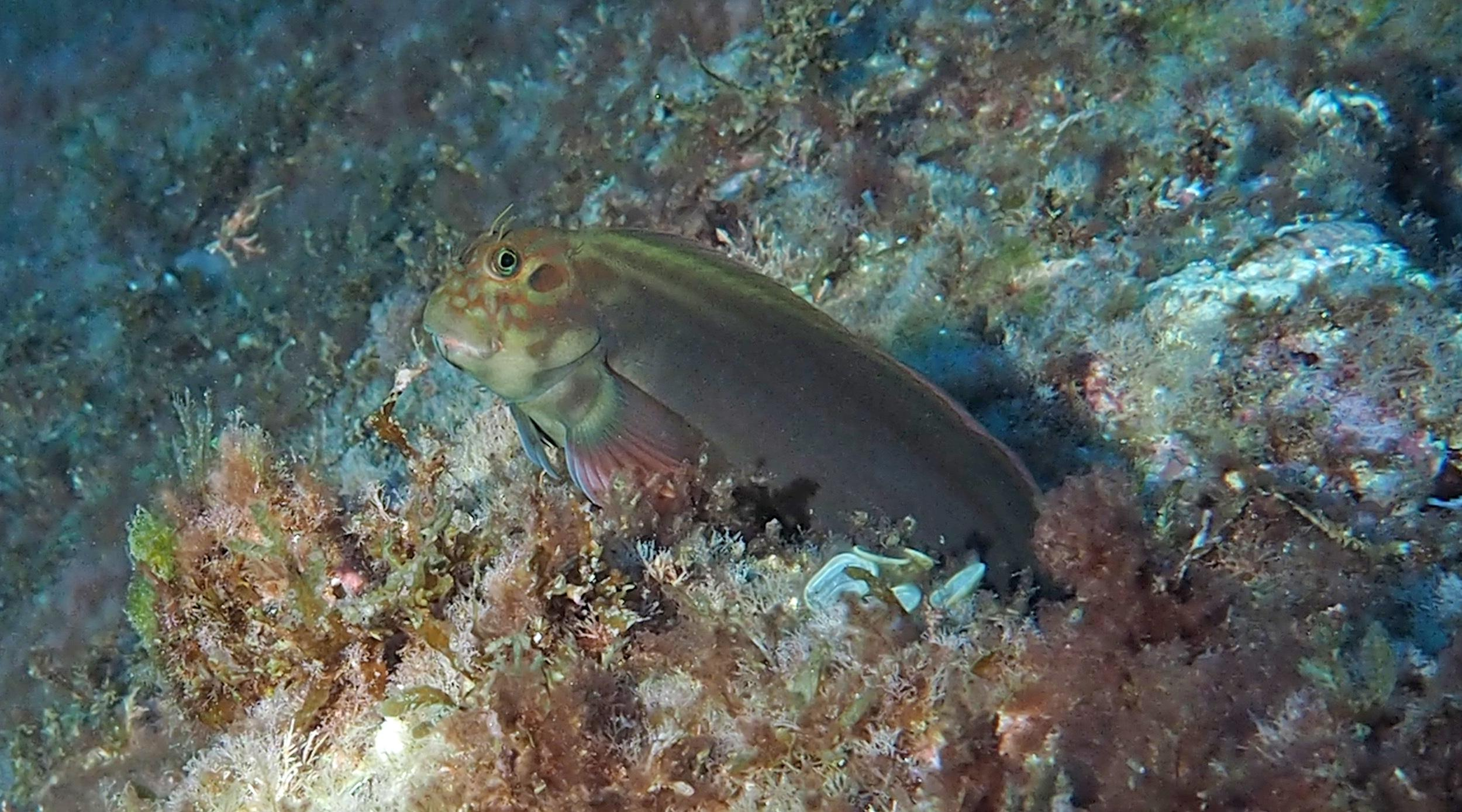

Conservation status
- Least Concern (IUCN 3.1)

Scientific classification
- Kingdom: Animalia
- Phylum: Chordata
- Class: Actinopterygii
- Order: Blenniiformes
- Family: Blenniidae
- Genus: Hypleurochilus
- Species: H. bananensis

Binomial name
- Hypleurochilus bananensis (Poll, 1959)

Synonyms
- Blennius bananensis Poll, 1959; Hypleurochilus phrynus Bath, 1965

= Hypleurochilus bananensis =

Species of fish

Hypleurochilus bananensis is a species of combtooth blenny which is patchily distributed in the eastern central Atlantic ocean from Israel to the Democratic Republic of the Congo. This species grows to a length of 10.5 centimetres (4.1 in) SL.
