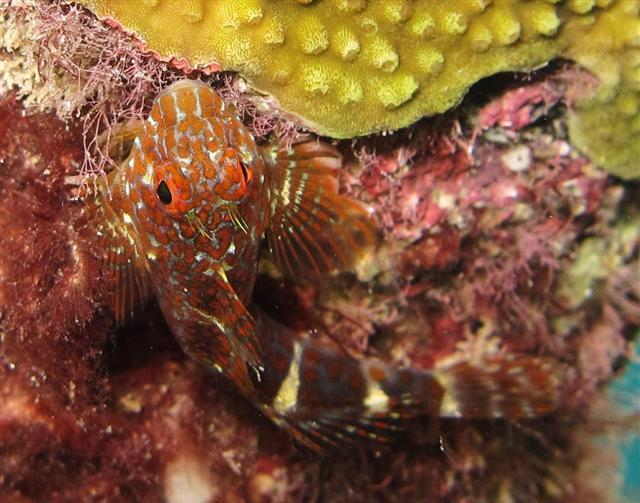

Conservation status
- Least Concern (IUCN 3.1)

Scientific classification
- Kingdom: Animalia
- Phylum: Chordata
- Class: Actinopterygii
- Order: Blenniiformes
- Family: Blenniidae
- Genus: Hypleurochilus
- Species: H. springeri

Binomial name
- Hypleurochilus springeri J. E. Randall, 1966

= Hypleurochilus springeri =

Species of fish

Hypleurochilus springeri, the orange-spotted blenny, is a species of combtooth blenny found in coral reefs in the Caribbean Sea. This species grows to a length of 5 centimetres (2.0 in) TL. The specific name honours the American ichthyologist Victor G. Springer.
