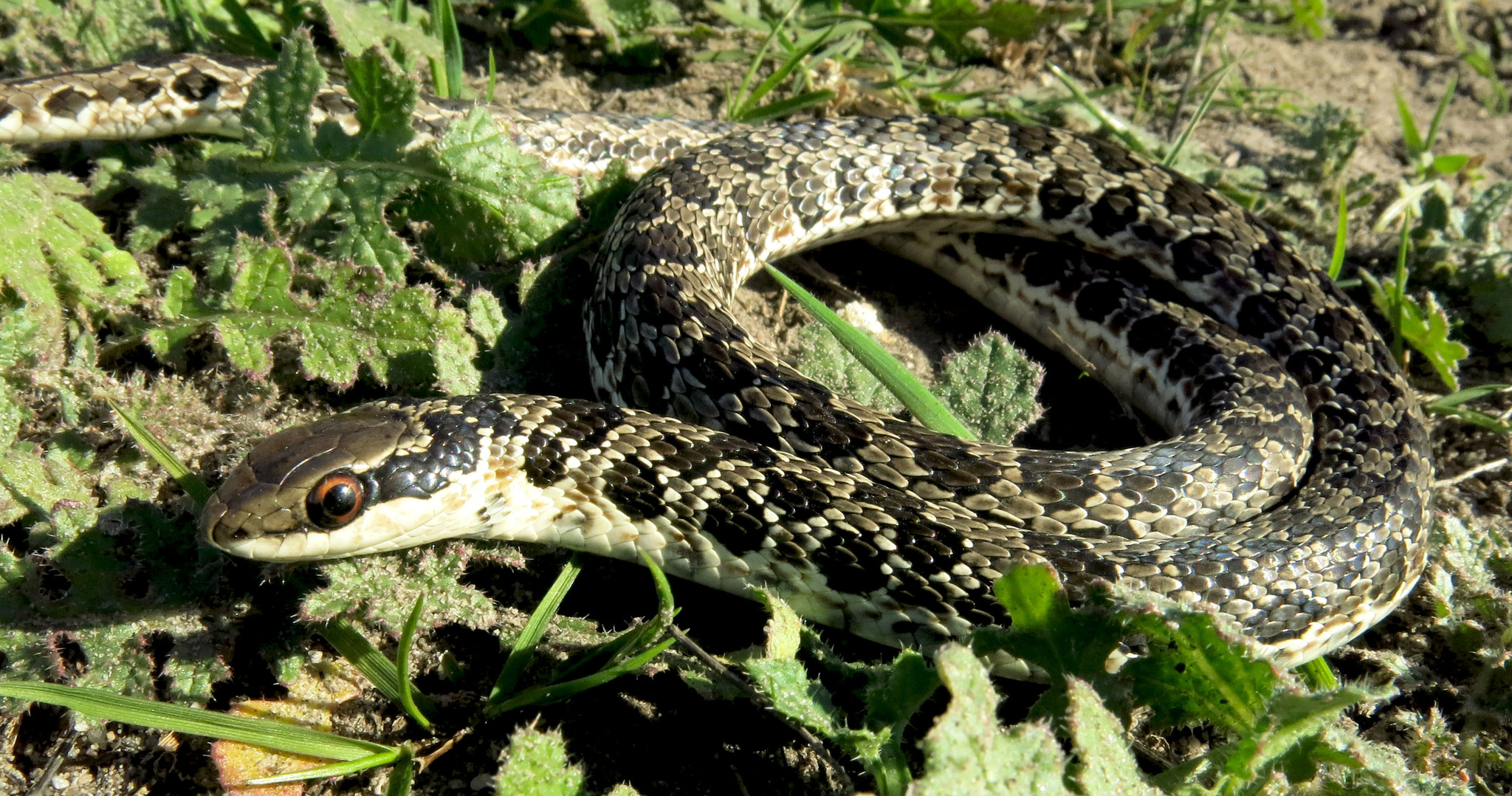

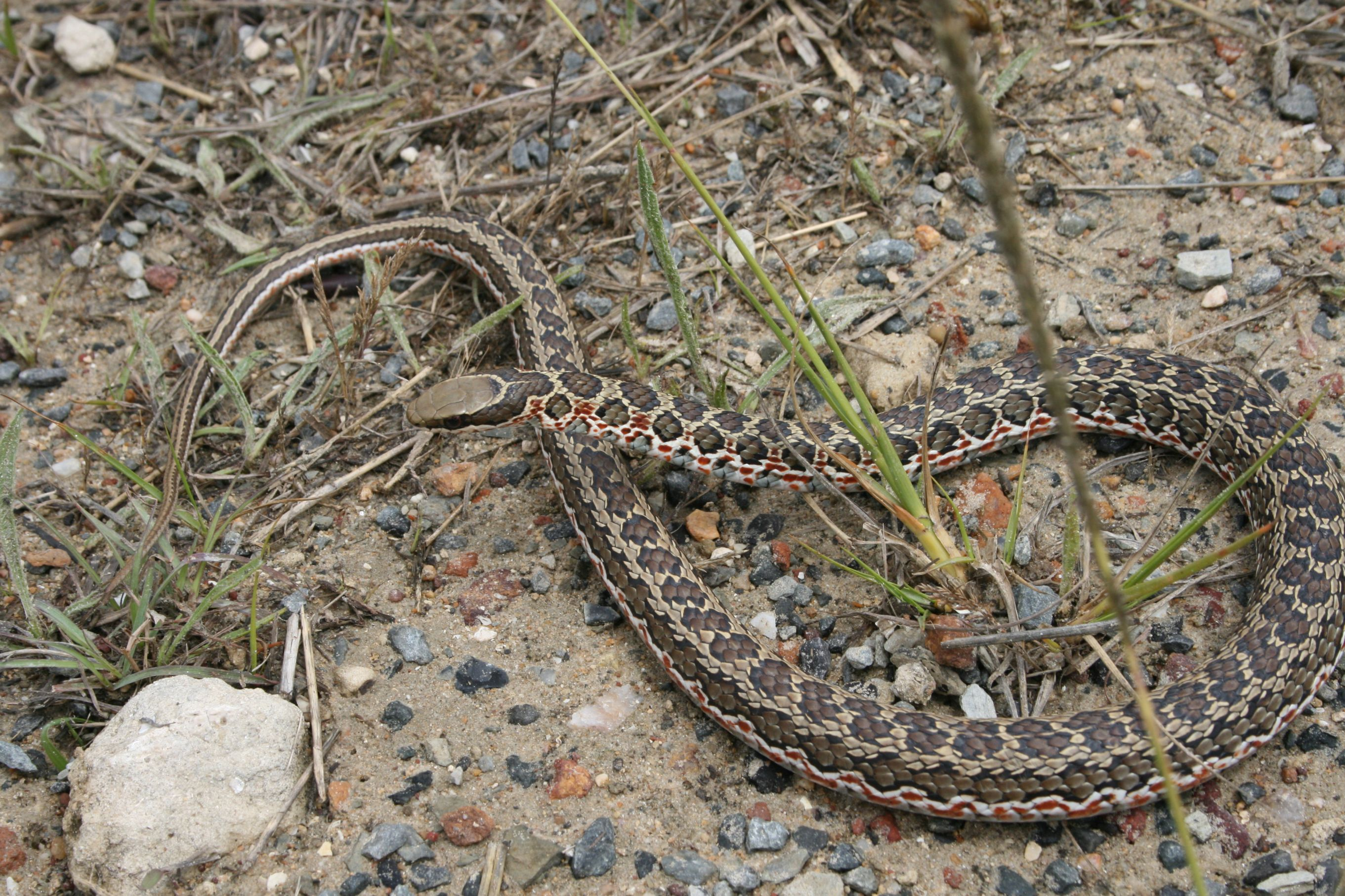

Conservation status
- Least Concern (IUCN 3.1)

Scientific classification
- Kingdom: Animalia
- Phylum: Chordata
- Class: Reptilia
- Order: Squamata
- Suborder: Serpentes
- Family: Psammophiidae
- Genus: Psammophylax
- Species: P. rhombeatus

Binomial name
- Psammophylax rhombeatus (Linnaeus, 1758)
- IUCN range (2019) Extant (resident) Possibly extinct Presence uncertain & origin uncertain

= Psammophylax rhombeatus =

Species of snake

Psammophylax rhombeatus is a reptile commonly found throughout Southern Africa. This mildly venomous snake has a similar role in its ecosystem and has many ancestral similarities to other Psammophis snakes.

== Etymology ==
The Psammophylax rhombeatus (psammo meaning "sand", phylax meaning "guard") has many common names. Some of those names include: spotted grass snake, rhombic skaapsteker, getpikkelde skaapsteker, spotted skaapsteker, rhomben-skaapsteker, gefleckter skaapsteker, and gevlekte skaapsteker.

The origin of the name Skaapsteker is another meaning for 'sheep stabber' or 'sheep stinger.' This is from the common misbelief that the Psammophylax rhombeatus was responsible for the death of large numbers of sheep. This was incorrect because the sheep deaths were caused by another snake, most likely the naja nivea, also known as the Cape cobra. It is known that the Psammophylax rhombeatus did not prey on sheep because of the formation of their jaws. This and the toxicity of their venom would not allow them to cause any real harm to the sheep, or any other large animal.

== Description ==
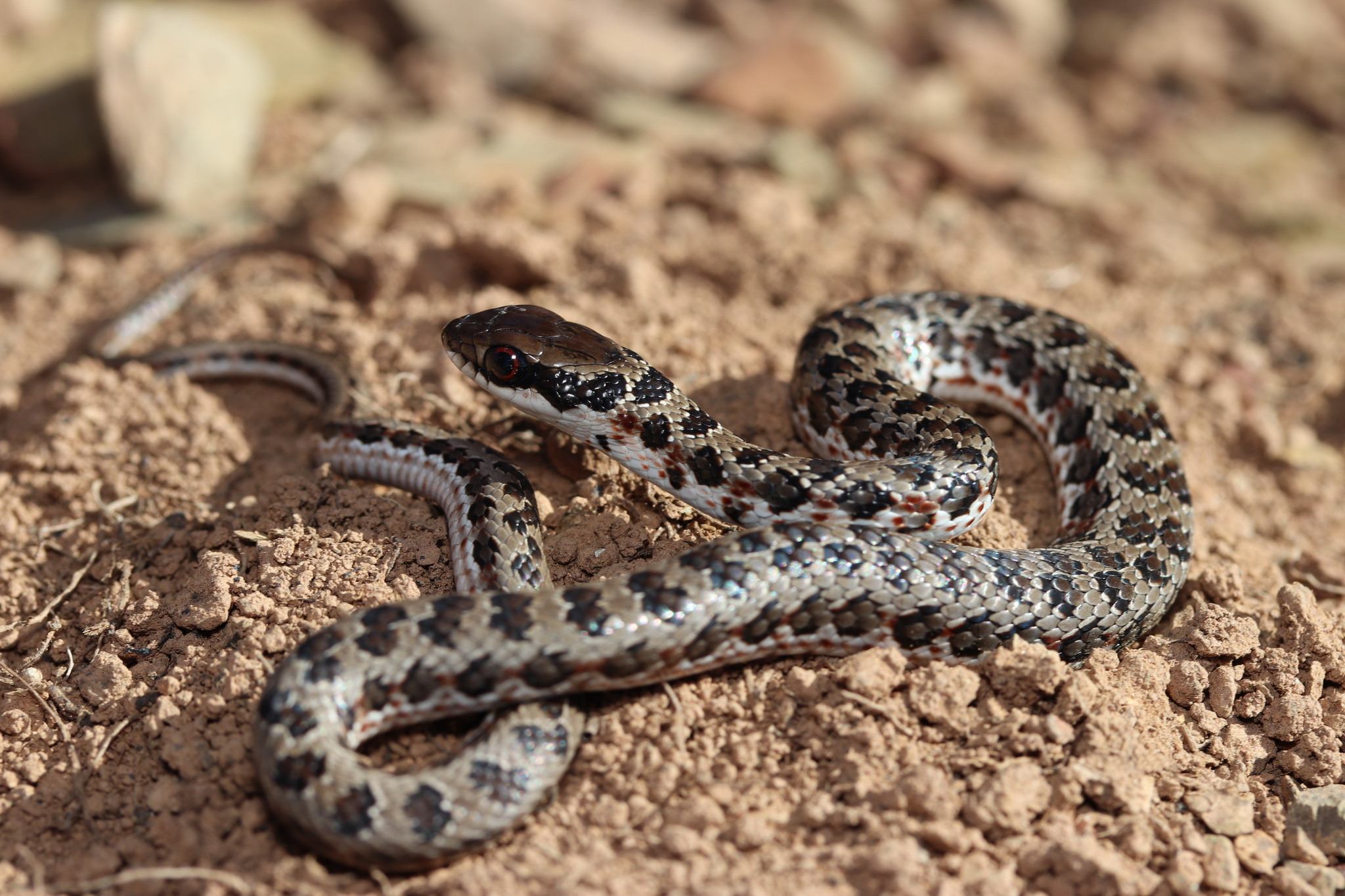

The Psammophylax rhombeatus ranges in colour from grey, to different shades of brown. Relating to its name, this species' back is patterned with rhombuses. The rhombuses show up in different patterns and colours. The colour of the snake underneath ranges from yellow to white. In length, the Psammophylax rhombeatus is typically 45 to 85 centimetres; however, there have been measurements recorded up to 140 centimetres.

Psammophylax rhombeatus, much like its close relatives in the genus Psammophylax, lay eggs and actively hunt for its prey. This portrays behaviours typical of whipsnakes. However, unlike the slender-bodied whipsnakes, Psammophylax has a more robust build. This difference in body shape likely reflects how each species has adapted to its specific environment and lifestyle.

== Reproduction ==
The species falls between oviparous (animals that reproduce by laying an egg, which will in turn hatch into a juvenile animal) and ovoviviparous (giving birth to living young from within the body rather than laying eggs) as it lays its eggs partly incubated.The breeding season for rhombic skaapstekers typically occurs during the summer months, and a female snake can lay a clutch of eggs ranging from 8 to 30. The eggs are usually deposited in concealed locations such as under rocks or in leaf litter to protect them from predators and environmental conditions.

During the incubation period, the female rhombic skaapsteker displays protective behaviour towards her eggs. She may coil around the clutch to provide warmth and safeguard them until they hatch. This maternal care is crucial for the survival of the developing embryos. The incubation period can vary but generally lasts several weeks to a couple of months, depending on environmental factors like temperature and humidity.

The lifespan of Psammophylax rhombeatus in the wild is not definitively established, but like many small to medium-sized snakes, they likely have a lifespan of at least 10 years or more. Their survival and reproductive success are influenced by factors such as habitat availability, prey availability, and interactions with other species in their ecosystem.

== Habitat ==
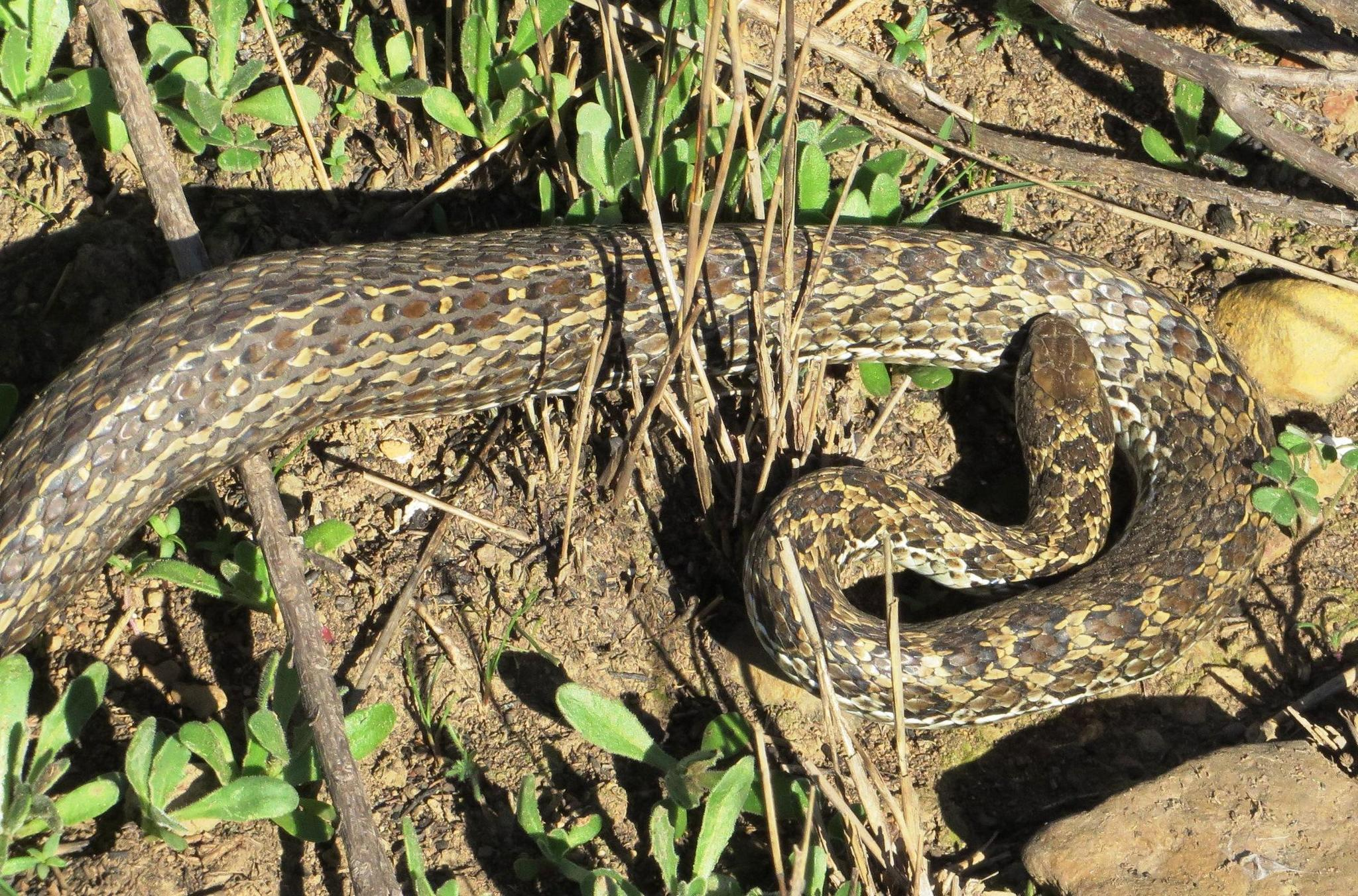
Rhombic skaapsteker in typical habitat, near Somerset West

African grass snakes, belonging to the family Lamprophiidae, typically range from small to medium in size. They inhabit the moist savanna and grassland biomes, where they are commonly described as terrestrial, diurnal, and active foragers. These snakes are adapted to life on the ground, where they actively hunt for prey during the daytime hours. Their foraging behaviour involves actively searching for food rather than relying on ambush tactics, allowing them to explore their environment extensively in search of prey items such as small mammals, birds, and reptiles. It is found in the Western Cape, Kwazulu-Natal, Lesotho, Free State, Eswatini, and northwards through Northern Cape to Namibia and southern Angola in the west and to Limpopo province of South Africa in the east.

== Predation ==
They are alert, fast moving, diurnal predators that are able to exploit a diverse array of prey classes. Occurring from sea level to mountain tops, it is a fast-moving diurnal snake and an active predator on small frogs, lizards and mammals. Psammophylax (Fitzinger 1843; subfamily Psammophiinae) is a widespread African snake genus, commonly referred to as skaapstekers ("sheep-stabbers") for the erroneous belief that they commonly bite and kill sheep. The name is misleading as its jaw structure and neurotoxic (venom that affects the nervous system, including the brain) venom is mild. It has a gentle disposition, being reluctant to bite even when provoked. Despite its extensive range and local prevalence, surprisingly little is known about the diet and foraging strategies of the African grass snake.
