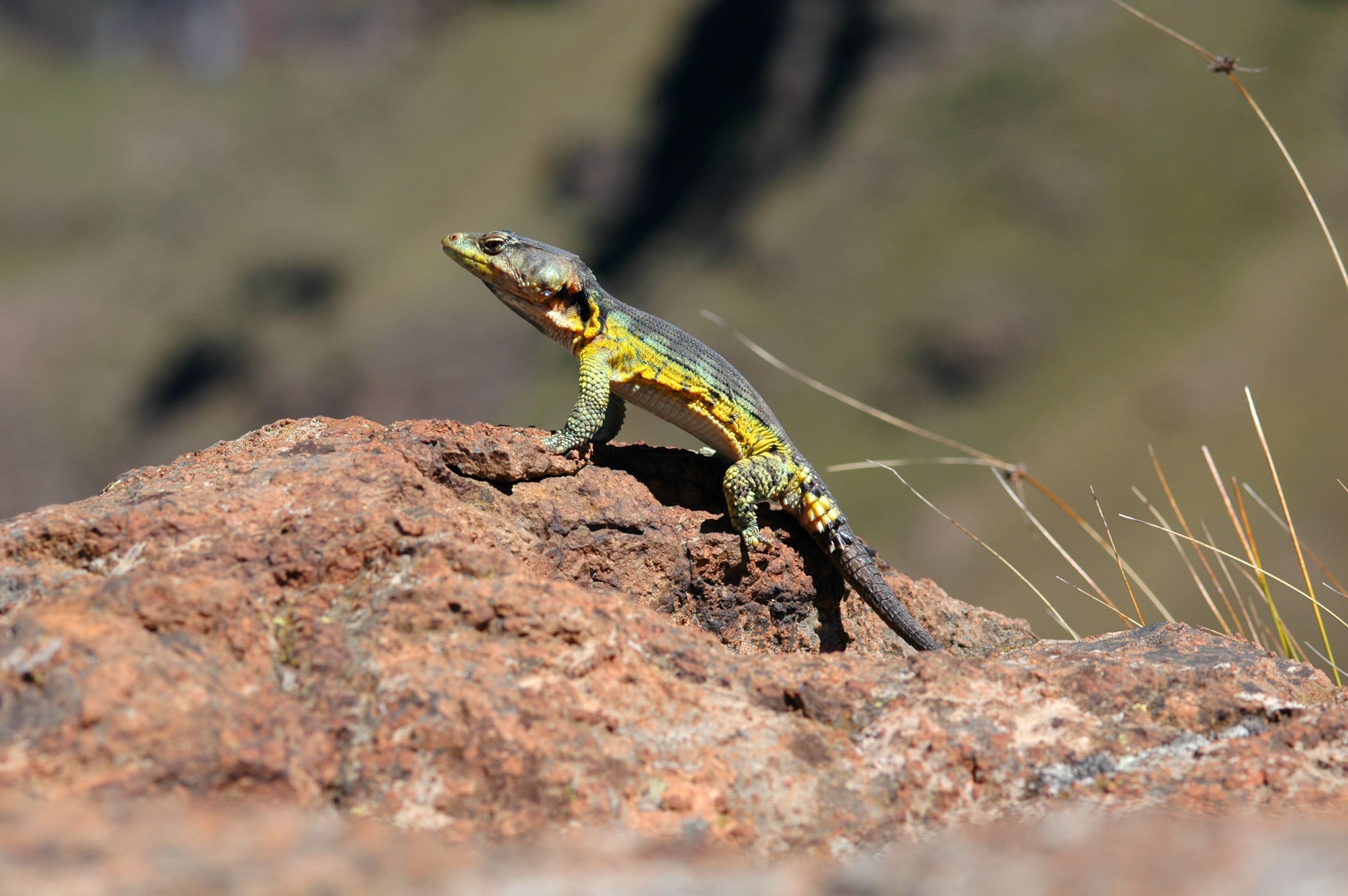

Scientific classification
- Kingdom: Animalia
- Phylum: Chordata
- Class: Reptilia
- Order: Squamata
- Family: Cordylidae
- Genus: Pseudocordylus
- Species: P. subviridis

Binomial name
- Pseudocordylus subviridis (Smith, 1838)

Synonyms
- Cordylus (Pseudocordylus) sub-viridis Smith, 1838

= Pseudocordylus subviridis =

Drakensberg crag lizard

Species of lizard

Pseudocordylus subviridis, also known as the Drakensberg crag lizard, is a species of lizard in the family Cordylidae. It is a small lizard found in South Africa and Lesotho. It can grow to about 10 cm (3.9 in) from snout to vent.
