= Tropidosaura essexi =

Conservation status
- Least Concern (IUCN 3.1)

Scientific classification
- Kingdom: Animalia
- Phylum: Chordata
- Class: Reptilia
- Order: Squamata
- Family: Lacertidae
- Genus: Tropidosaura
- Species: T. essexi

Binomial name
- Tropidosaura essexi Hewitt, 1927

Species of lizard

Tropidosaura essexi, also known commonly as Essex's mountain lizard, is a species of lizard in the family Lacertidae. The species is native to southern Africa.

== Etymology ==
The specific name, essexi, is in honor of South African herpetologist Robert Essex.

== Geographic range ==
T. essexi is found in Lesotho and South Africa.

== Habitat ==
The preferred natural habitat of T. essexi is grassland, at altitudes of 2,400–3,400 m (7,900–11,200 ft).

== Description ==
T. essexi is small for its genus. Adults have a snout-to-vent length (SVL) of only 4–5 cm (1.6–2.0 in).

== Behavior ==
T. essexi is diurnal and terrestrial.

== Reproduction ==
T. essexi is viviparous, and is the only African lacertid known to be viviparous.
