= Hemicordylus nebulosus =

Conservation status
- Vulnerable (IUCN 3.1)

Scientific classification
- Kingdom: Animalia
- Phylum: Chordata
- Class: Reptilia
- Order: Squamata
- Suborder: Scinciformata
- Infraorder: Scincomorpha
- Family: Cordylidae
- Genus: Hemicordylus
- Species: H. nebulosus

Binomial name
- Hemicordylus nebulosus (Mouton & van Wyk, 1995)

Species of lizard

Hemicordylus nebulosus is a species of lizard in the Cordylidae family. It is endemic to South Africa on the mist belt of northern slope of the Hottentots Holland Mountains. The scientific name, H. nebulosus means cloud or dark crag lizard. The name was given due to the melanistic body color. Other names include the dwarf cliff lizard, dwarf crag lizard, dark crag lizard and the cloudy crag lizard.

== Sources ==
- Hemicordylus resurrected: Stanley et al., 2011, Between a rock and a hard polytomy: Rapid radiation in the rupicolous girdled lizards (Squamata: Cordylidae)
- World Conservation Monitoring Centre (1996). "Cordylus nebulosus". IUCN Red List of Threatened Species. 1996 e.T18519A8365473. doi:10.2305/IUCN.UK.1996.RLTS.T18519A8365473.en.
