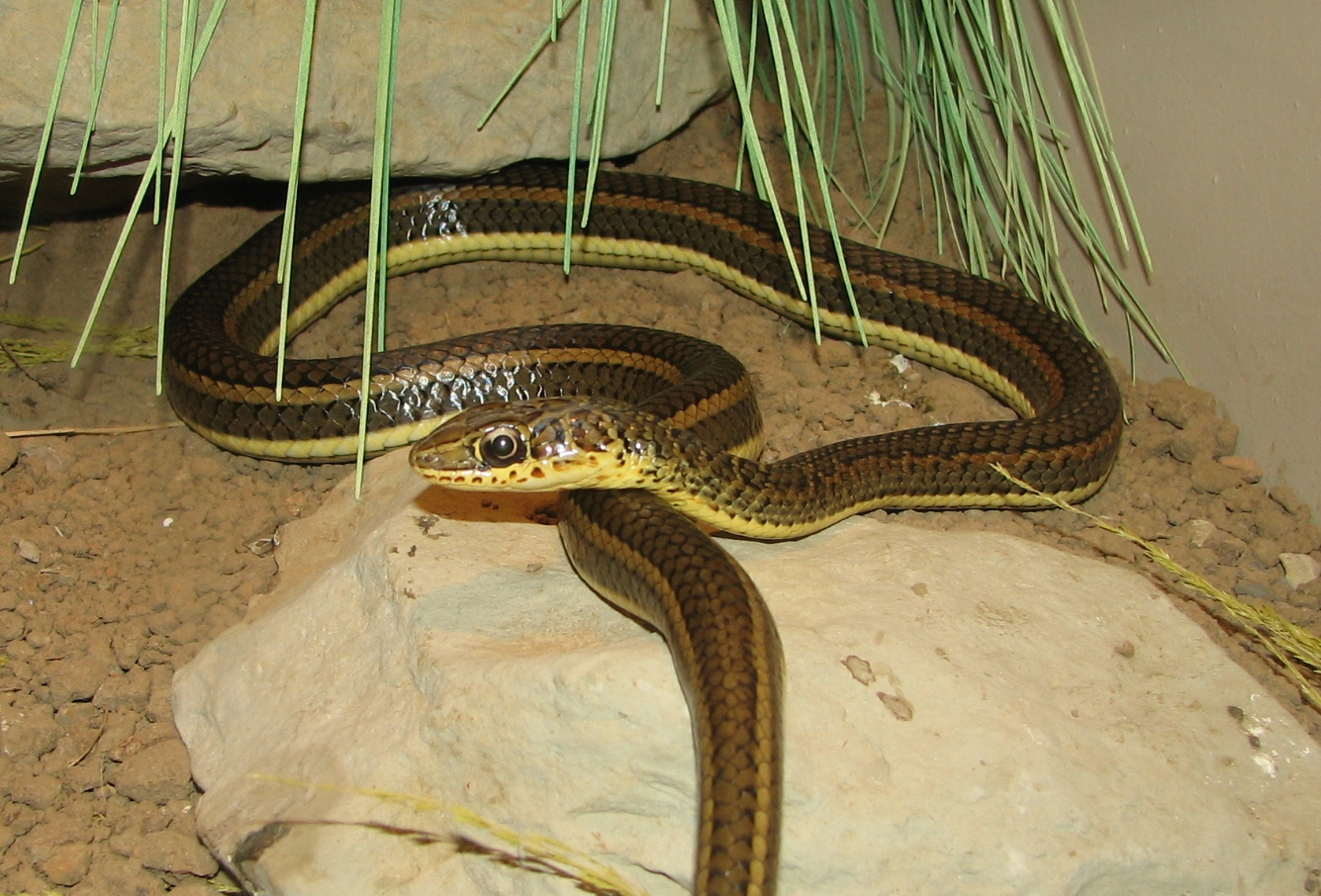
- Psammophylax rhombeatus

Scientific classification
- Domain: Eukaryota
- Kingdom: Animalia
- Phylum: Chordata
- Class: Reptilia
- Order: Squamata
- Suborder: Serpentes
- Family: Psammophiidae
- Genus: Psammophylax; Fitzinger, 1843

= Psammophylax =

Genus of snakes

Psammophylax is a genus of snakes of the family Psammophiidae.

== Species ==
- Psammophylax kellyi Keates, Conradie, Greenbaum, & Edwards, 2019 - Tanzanian grass snake, Tanzanian skaapsteker
- Psammophylax multisquamis (Loveridge, 1932) - Kenyan striped skaapsteker
- Psammophylax ocellatus (Bocage, 1873) - Angolan skaapsteker
- Psammophylax rhombeatus (Linnaeus, 1758) - spotted grass snake, spotted skaapsteker, rhombic skaapsteker
- Psammophylax tritaeniatus (Günther, 1868) - three-lined grass snake, striped skaapsteker
- Psammophylax variabilis Günther, 1893 - grey-bellied grass snake, grey-bellied skaapstekker
