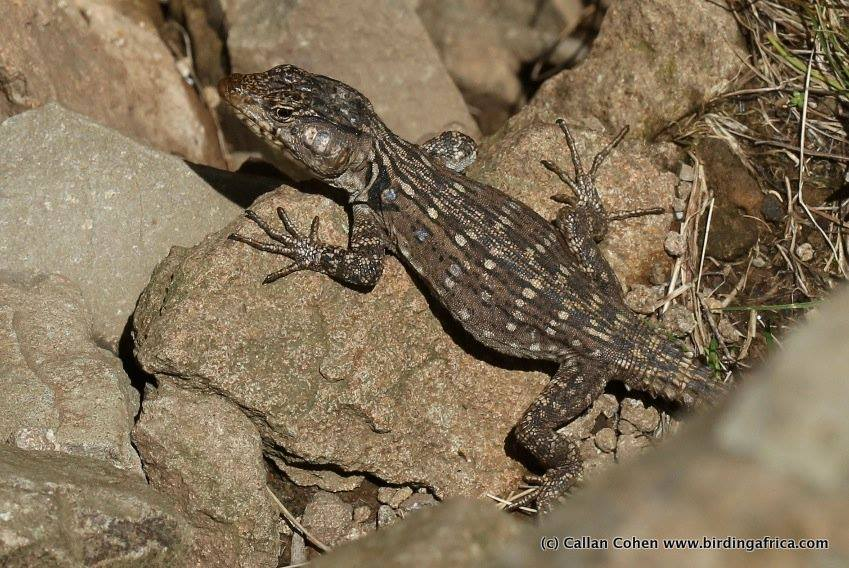

Conservation status
- Least Concern (IUCN 3.1)

Scientific classification
- Kingdom: Animalia
- Phylum: Chordata
- Class: Reptilia
- Order: Squamata
- Family: Cordylidae
- Genus: Pseudocordylus
- Species: P. langi

Binomial name
- Pseudocordylus langi Loveridge, 1944

Synonyms
- Cordylus langi (Loveridge, 1944)

= Lang's crag lizard =

Species of lizard

Lang's crag lizard (Pseudocordylus langi), also known commonly as Lang's girdled lizard, is a species of lizard in the family Cordylidae. The species is endemic to Southern Africa.

== Etymology ==
The specific name, langi, is in honor of German taxidermist Herbert Lang.

== Geographic range ==
P. langi is found in Lesotho and South Africa where it is restricted to the summit of the Drakensberg at altitudes of 2,700–3,100 m (8,900–10,200 ft).

== Habitat ==
The preferred natural habitat of P. langi is grassland.

== Reproduction ==
P. langi is ovoviviparous.
