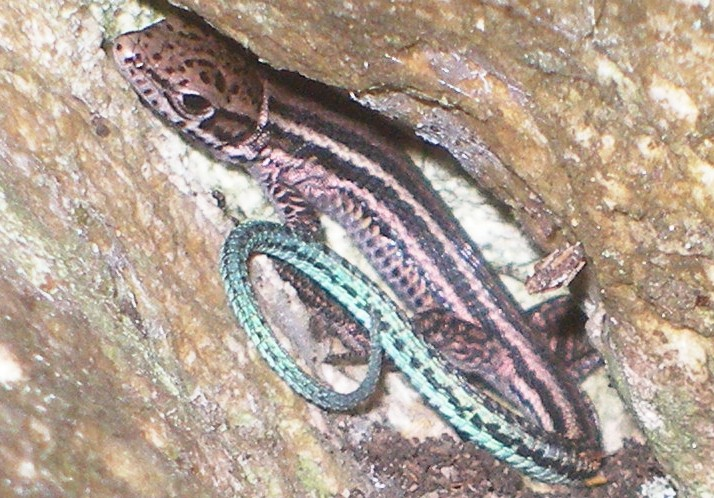
- Tropidosaura gularis

Scientific classification
- Kingdom: Animalia
- Phylum: Chordata
- Class: Reptilia
- Order: Squamata
- Family: Lacertidae
- Subfamily: Lacertinae
- Genus: Tropidosaura; Fitzinger, 1826

Species
- Four, see text.

= Tropidosaura =

Genus of wall lizards from South Africa

Tropidosaura is a genus of wall lizards of the family Lacertidae. The genus is endemic to southern Africa.

== Geographic range ==
All species in the genus Tropidosaura are found in southern Africa.

== Species ==
The following four species are recognized.

- Tropidosaura cottrelli (Hewitt, 1925) – Cottrell's mountain lizard
- Tropidosaura essexi Hewitt, 1927 – Essex's mountain lizard
- Tropidosaura gularis Hewitt, 1927 – Cape mountain lizard, yellow-striped mountain lizard
- Tropidosaura montana (Gray, 1831) – common mountain lizard, green-striped mountain lizard

Nota bene: A binomial authority in parentheses indicates that the species was originally described in a genus other than Tropidosaura.
