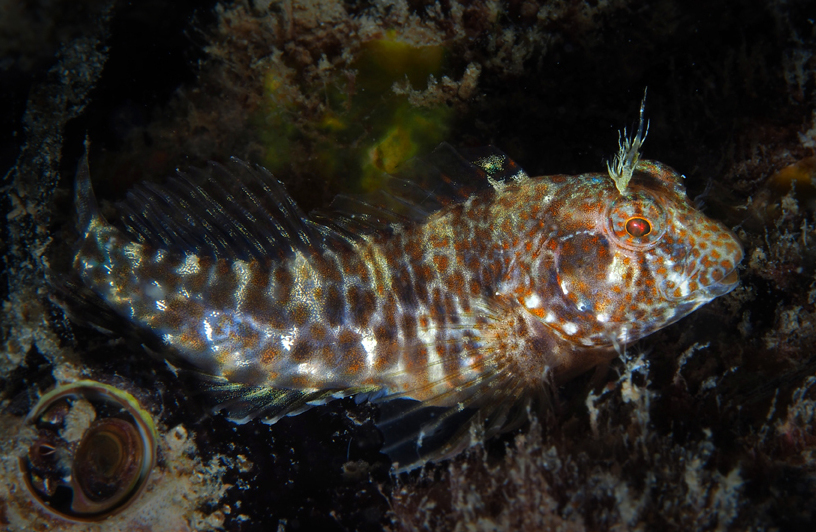

Conservation status
- Least Concern (IUCN 3.1)

Scientific classification
- Kingdom: Animalia
- Phylum: Chordata
- Class: Actinopterygii
- Order: Blenniiformes
- Family: Blenniidae
- Genus: Hypleurochilus
- Species: H. pseudoaequipinnis

Binomial name
- Hypleurochilus pseudoaequipinnis Bath, 1994

= Hypleurochilus pseudoaequipinnis =

Species of fish

Hypleurochilus pseudoaequipinnis is a species of combtooth blenny found in the Atlantic ocean, in the Americas it ranges from Cape Canaveral, Florida to Santa Catarina in Brazil and the eastern Atlantic it is found off Sao Tome and Principe in the Gulf of Guinea.
