= Tropidosaura cottrelli =

Conservation status
- Least Concern (IUCN 3.1)

Scientific classification
- Kingdom: Animalia
- Phylum: Chordata
- Class: Reptilia
- Order: Squamata
- Family: Lacertidae
- Genus: Tropidosaura
- Species: T. cottrelli

Binomial name
- Tropidosaura cottrelli (Hewitt, 1925)

Synonyms
- Basutosaura cottrelli Hewitt, 1925; Tropidosaura cottrelli — V. FitzSimons, 1943

Species of lizard

Tropidosaura cottrelli, also known commonly as Cottrell's mountain lizard, is a species of lizard in the family Lacertidae. The species is native to southern Africa.

== Etymology ==
The specific name, cottrelli, is in honor of South African ornithologist John Awdry Cottrell, who collected the holotype.

== Geographic range ==
T. cottrelli is found in Lesotho and South Africa.

== Habitat ==
The preferred natural habitat of T. cottrelli is grassland, at altitudes of 2,500–3,300 m (8,200–10,800 ft).

== Description ==
T. cottrelli is large for its genus. Adults have a snout-to-vent length (SVL) of 5.5–6.5 cm (2.2–2.6 in).

== Reproduction ==
T. cottrelli is oviparous. An adult female may lay as many as four eggs.
