= Hypleurochilus aequipinnis =

Conservation status
- Least Concern (IUCN 3.1)

Scientific classification
- Kingdom: Animalia
- Phylum: Chordata
- Class: Actinopterygii
- Order: Blenniiformes
- Family: Blenniidae
- Genus: Hypleurochilus
- Species: H. aequipinnis

Binomial name
- Hypleurochilus aequipinnis (Günther, 1861)

Synonyms
- Blennius aequipinnis Günther, 1861

Species of fish

Hypleurochilus aequipinnis, the oyster blenny, is a species of combtooth blenny found in coral reefs in the western Atlantic ocean. This species grows to a length of 7.5 centimetres (3.0 in) TL.

The species is oviparous and their larvae is planktonic. They feed on crustaceans, hydroids, bryozoans and pelecypods.

== Distribution ==
The species has a wide distribution across the Western Atlantic, from southern Florida to northern South America - species have been reported as far as Brazil.
