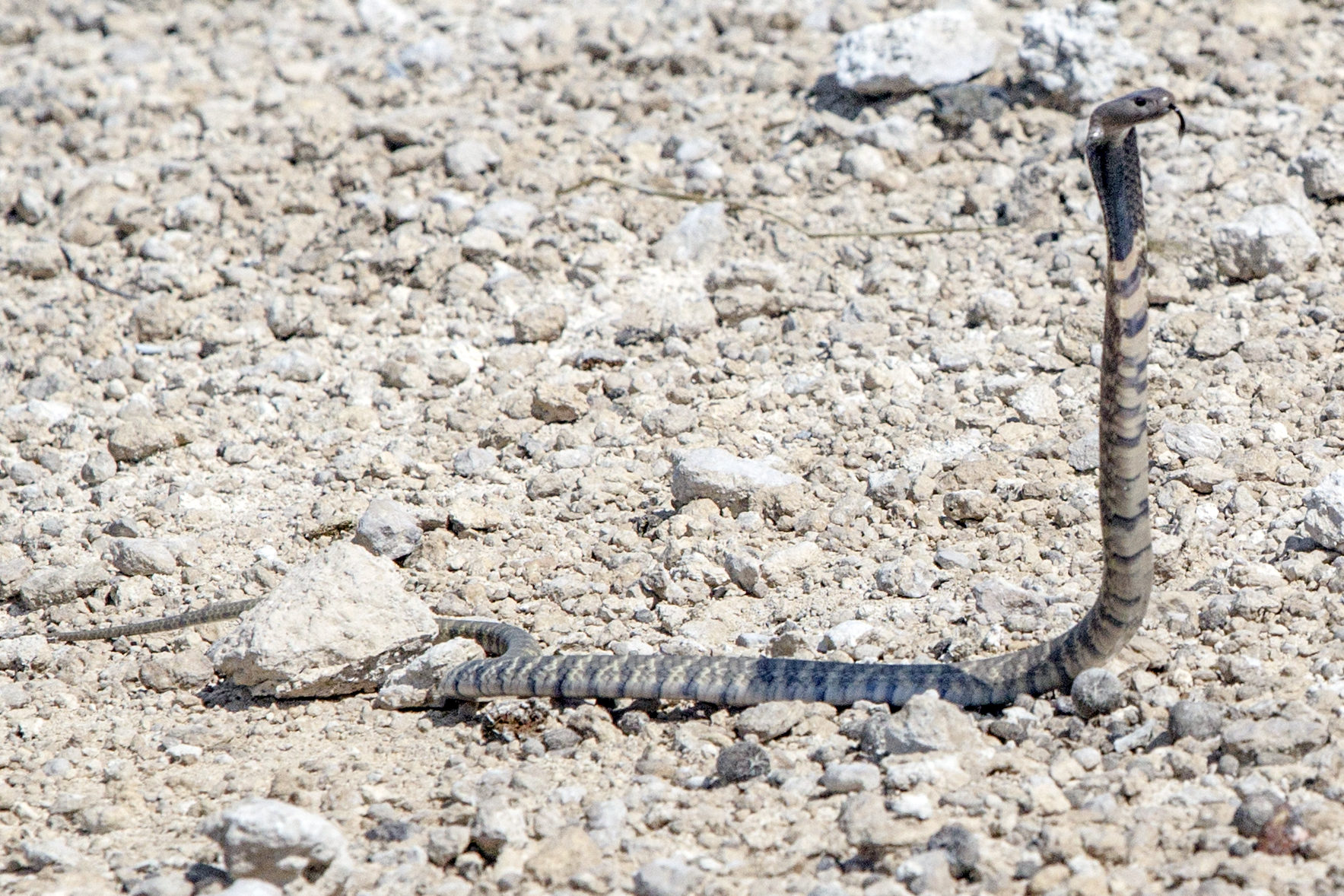
- N. n. nigricincta commonly known as zebra spitting cobra in Etosha National Park

Conservation status
- Least Concern (IUCN 3.1)

Scientific classification
- Kingdom: Animalia
- Phylum: Chordata
- Class: Reptilia
- Order: Squamata
- Suborder: Serpentes
- Family: Elapidae
- Genus: Naja
- Species: N. nigricincta

Binomial name
- Naja nigricincta Bogert, 1940
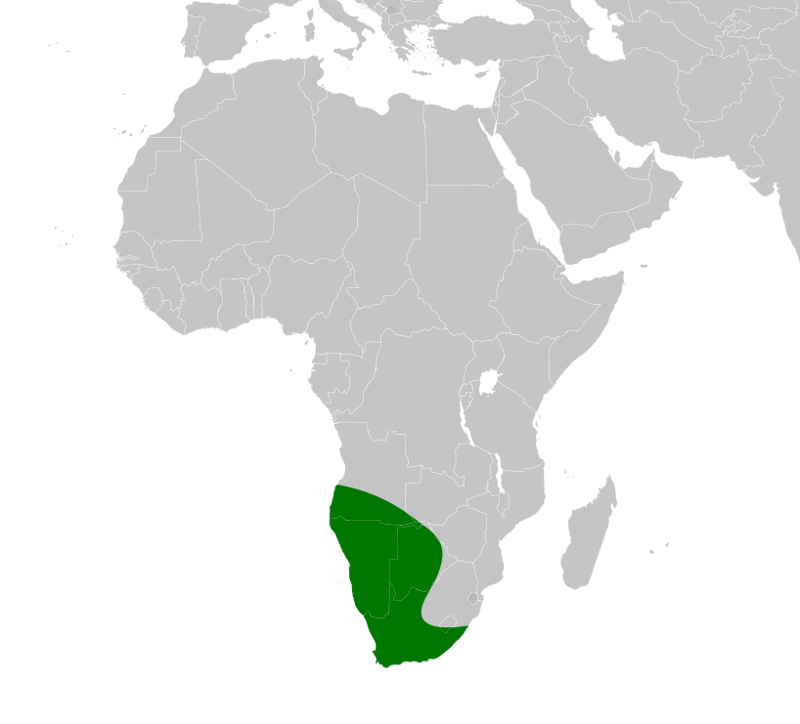
- The approximate range of Naja nigricincta in Africa

Synonyms
- Naja nigricollis nigricincta Bogert 1940; Naja nigricollis woodi Pringle, 1955; Naja mossambica nigricincta — Broadley, 1968; Naja mossambica woodi — Broadley, 1968; Naja nigricollis woodi — Broadley, 1974; Naja woodi — Bauer & Branch, 2003; Naja nigricincta — Cimatti, 2007; Naja nigricincta woodi — Wüster et al., 2007

= Naja nigricincta =

Species of snake

Naja nigricincta, or Western barred spitting cobra, is a species of spitting cobra in the genus Naja, belonging to the family Elapidae. The species is native to the deserts and drier regions of southern Africa. The species is largely nocturnal, and is often found while crossing roads at night. There are two recognized subspecies.

== Taxonomy ==
Naja nigricincta had long been considered to be a subspecies of the black-necked spitting cobra (Naja nigricollis), but morphological and genetic differences have led to its recognition as a separate species.

== Subspecies ==
Two subspecies are currently recognized under Naja nigricincta. The nominate subspecies N. n. nigricincta, commonly known as the zebra spitting cobra is given its name because of the dark crossbars that run the length of the snake's body. The subspecies N. n. woodi, commonly known as the black spitting cobra is solid black and is found only in the desert areas of southern Africa. Both subspecies are smaller than N. nigricollis; with average adult lengths of less than 1.5 metres (4.9 ft).

Subspecies	Common names	Geographic range	Regional differences
Naja nigricincta nigricincta Bogert 1940	Zebra spitting cobra Western barred spitting cobra Zebra Snake; Zebra Cobra	Central and northern Namibia and southern Angola	Grey brown, yellow, or pink with dark bands from head to tail
Naja nigricincta woodi Pringle 1955	Black spitting cobra Woods spitting cobra	Southern Namibia, southern Botswana, Lesotho, South Africa	Solid matte black as adults. Babies are grey bodied with a solid black head. Distinctively different from Naja nigricollis in size and being completely solid black. (S.Angeli 2017)

== Description ==
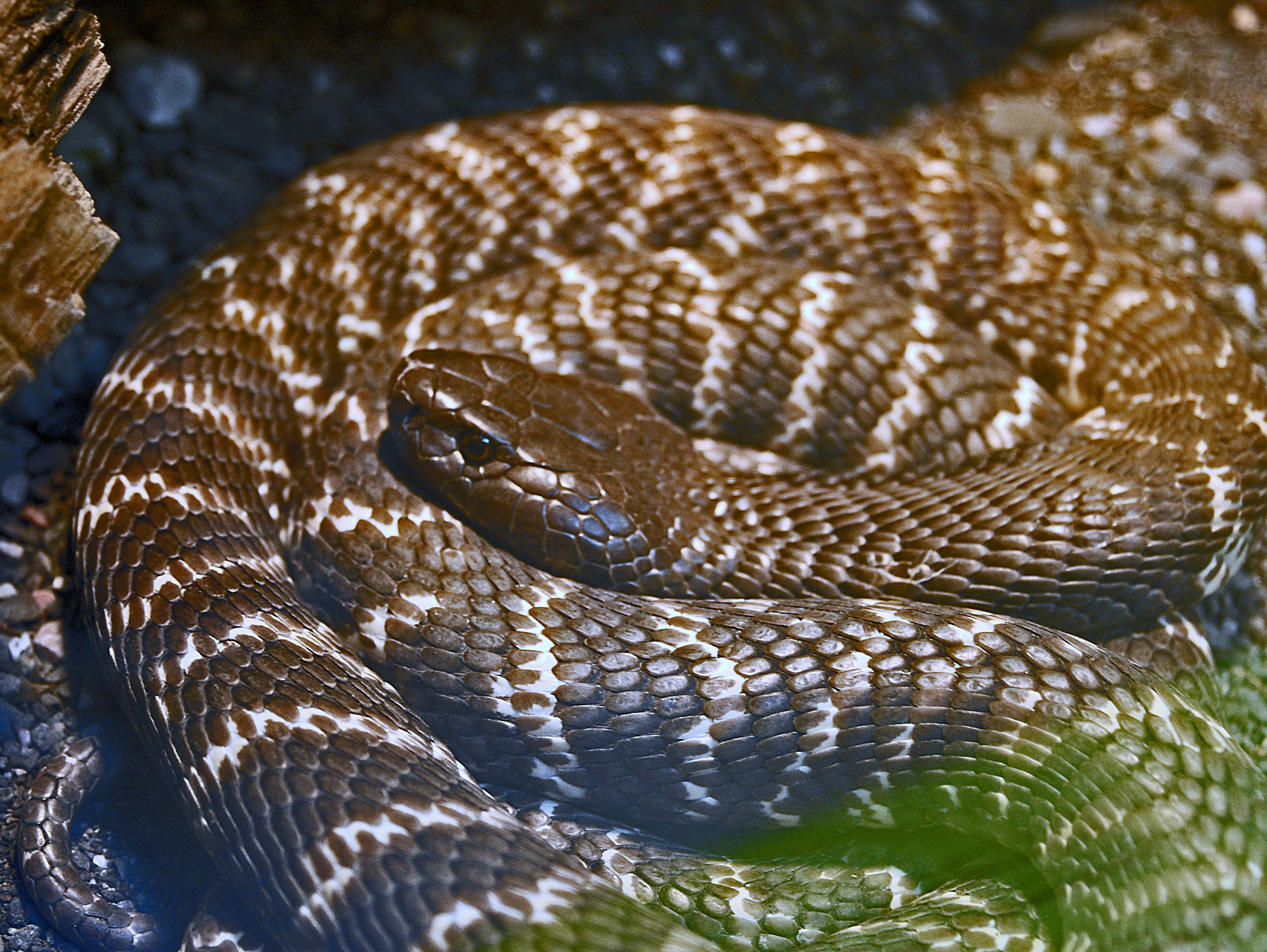
Naja nigricincta showing zebra-like stripes

Naja nigricincta is an oviparous venomous spitting cobra with dark brown to black body and zebra-like vertical whitish or light yellow stripes along the dorsal side. These stripes are generally evenly spaced and can be complete or fragmented. The ventral scales range from white to orange in color. In juvenile snakes the overall coloration is lighter than in the adults.

Like all other Naja species, this snake can flatten its head and neck into a hood. The head and hood are uniformly dark brown or black.

The venom of Naja nigricincta can cause massive hemorrhaging, necrosis and paralysis in bite victims. These snakes can also spit their venom, hitting their enemies with great accuracy and causing temporary or permanent blindness.

Fourteen patients with proven N.nigricollisbites, who were seen in the savanna region of Nigeria, did not exhibit the neurological signs, such as cranial nerve lesions and respiratory paralysis, expected following Elapid poisoning. All had local swelling, in eight cases involving the entire limb, and ten developed local tissue necrosis.

== Distribution ==
This species is native to parts of southern Africa (southern Angola, Namibia, Botswana, Lesotho, and South Africa).

The snake frequents human habitation, both urban and rural, and is commonly found inside dwellings. The majority of bites occur at night while the victims are asleep.
