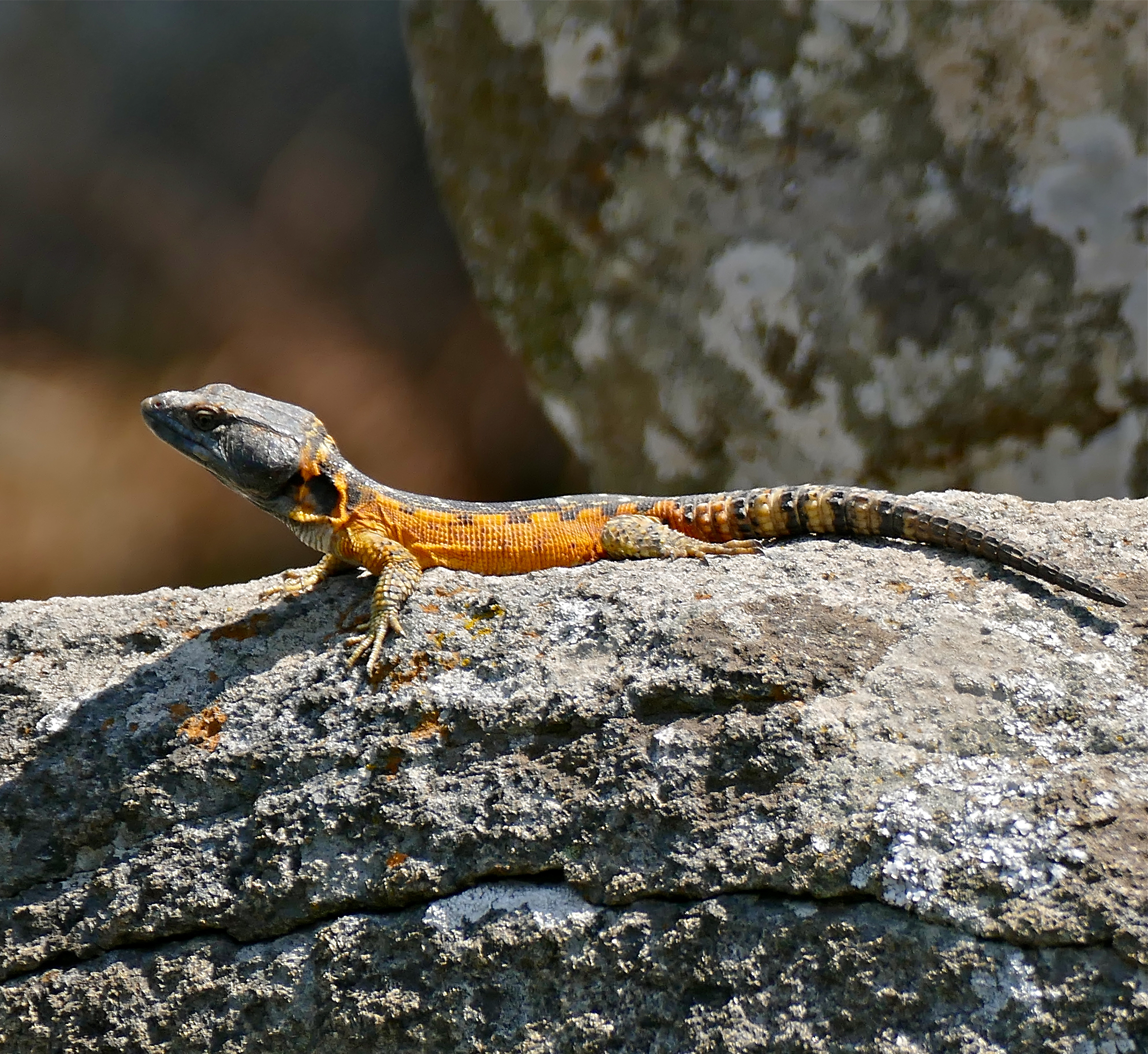
- P. melanotus in western Eswatini

Scientific classification
- Domain: Eukaryota
- Kingdom: Animalia
- Phylum: Chordata
- Class: Reptilia
- Order: Squamata
- Family: Cordylidae
- Genus: Pseudocordylus; A. Smith, 1838

= Pseudocordylus =

Crag lizards

Genus of lizards

Pseudocordylus is a genus of small to large girdled lizards from South Africa, commonly known as crag lizards. Six species of Pseudocordylus are known; they are distinguished from girdled lizards of the genus Cordylus by the presence of granular scales on the back instead of osteoderms.

== Species ==
The following six species are recognized as being valid.

- Pseudocordylus langi Loveridge, 1944 – Lang's crag lizard
- Pseudocordylus melanotus (A. Smith, 1838) – common crag lizard
- Pseudocordylus microlepidotus (Cuvier, 1829) – Cape crag lizard
- Pseudocordylus spinosus V. FitzSimons, 1947 – spiny crag lizard
- Pseudocordylus subviridis (A. Smith, 1838) – Drakensberg crag lizard
- Pseudocordylus transvaalensis V. FitzSimons, 1943 – northern crag lizard

Nota bene: A binomial authority in parentheses indicates that the species was originally described in a genus other than Pseudocordylus.
