= Acontias aurantiacus =

Conservation status
- Least Concern (IUCN 3.1)

Scientific classification
- Kingdom: Animalia
- Phylum: Chordata
- Class: Reptilia
- Order: Squamata
- Suborder: Scinciformata
- Infraorder: Scincomorpha
- Family: Acontidae
- Genus: Acontias
- Species: A. aurantiacus

Binomial name
- Acontias aurantiacus (Peters, 1854)

Synonyms
- Typhline aurantiaca Peters, 1854; Typhlosaurus aurantiacus — Bauer, et al. 1995

Species of lizard

Acontias aurantiacus, the golden blind legless skink, is a species of lizard in the family Scincidae. It is found in Zimbabwe, Mozambique, Botswana, and South Africa.

Three subspecies are recognized:

- Acontias aurantiacus aurantiacus (Peters, 1854)
- Acontias aurantiacus bazarutoensis Broadley, 1990 – Bazaruto Island, Mozambique
- Acontias aurantiacus carolinensis Broadley, 1990 – Santa Carolina, Mozambique

== Description ==
These are small to medium (69–216 mm snout-vent length) legless fossorial lizards with reduced eyes and pronounced rostral scales used in digging. The body is plain golden-yellow, with occasional melanistic or mottled individuals appearing in the population.

== Former Subspecies ==
A. fitzsimonsi and A. parietalis were formerly considered subspecies of A. aurantiacus but were elevated to full species status in 2018.
