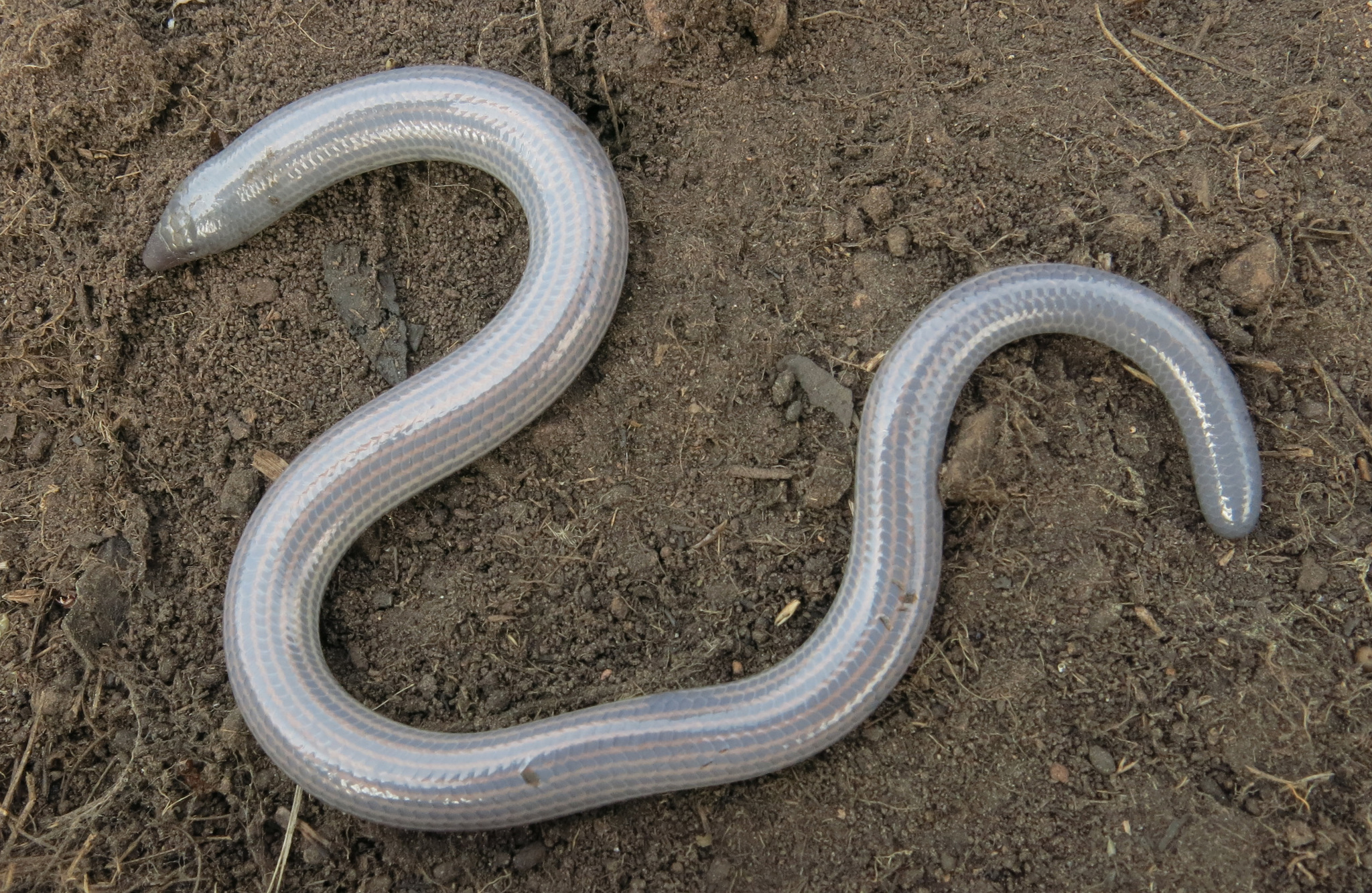

Conservation status
- Endangered (IUCN 3.1)

Scientific classification
- Kingdom: Animalia
- Phylum: Chordata
- Class: Reptilia
- Order: Squamata
- Family: Scincidae
- Genus: Acontias
- Species: A. rieppeli

Binomial name
- Acontias rieppeli Lamb, Biswas & Bauer, 2010

Synonyms
- Acontophiops lineatus Sternfeld, 1911

= Woodbush legless skink =

Species of lizard

The woodbush legless skink (Acontias rieppeli) is a species of legless skink. It is found in the Wolkberg mountains of Limpopo Province, South Africa. Females of the species give birth to live young. This lizard species was formerly placed in a monotypic (single species) genus as Acontophiops lineatus. Morphologically the genus shows similarities to Acontias cregoi (formerly Typhlosaurus cregoi) and a recent review placed both of these within the genus Acontias, which, as Acontias lineatus was already occupied, required a new name for this species.
