= Acontias namaquensis =

Conservation status
- Least Concern (IUCN 3.1)

Scientific classification
- Kingdom: Animalia
- Phylum: Chordata
- Class: Reptilia
- Order: Squamata
- Suborder: Scinciformata
- Infraorder: Scincomorpha
- Family: Acontidae
- Genus: Acontias
- Species: A. namaquensis

Binomial name
- Acontias namaquensis Hewitt, 1938

Synonyms
- Acontias plumbeus namaquensis Hewitt, 1938; Acontias gracilicauda namaquensis — Broadley and Greer, 1969; Acontias namaquensis – Lamb et al., 2010; Conradie et al., 2019

Species of lizard

Acontias namaquensis, the Namaqua legless skink or Namaqua lance skink, is a species of lizard in the family Scincidae. It is endemic to Little Namaqualand, Northern Cape, South Africa.
