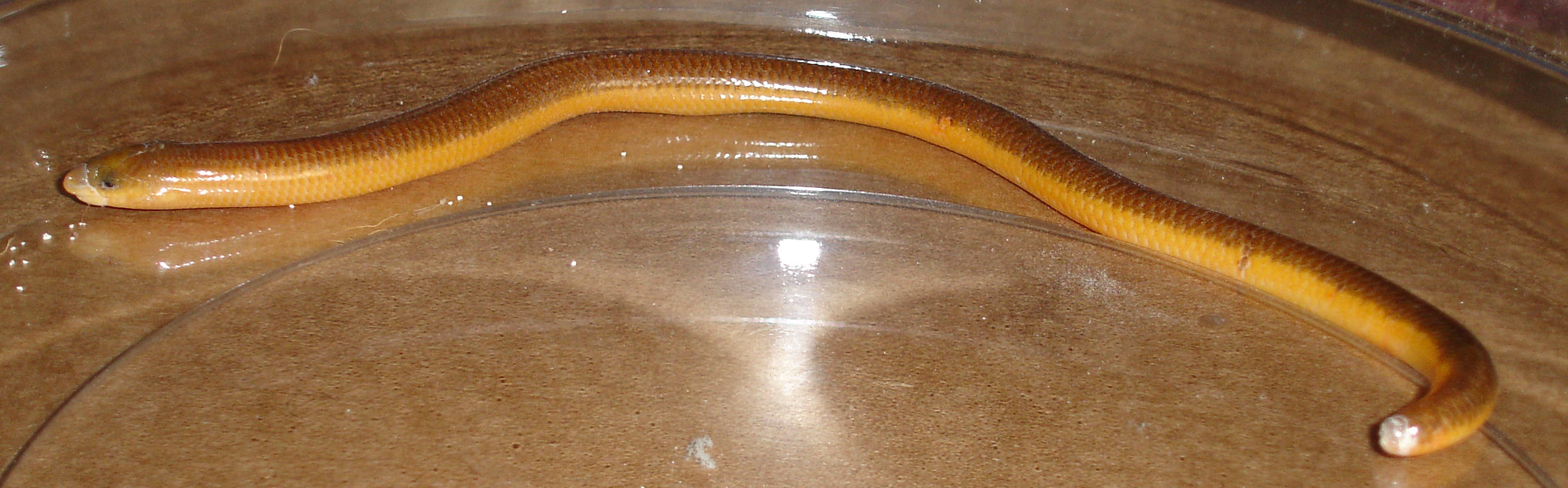

Conservation status
- Least Concern (IUCN 3.1)

Scientific classification
- Kingdom: Animalia
- Phylum: Chordata
- Class: Reptilia
- Order: Squamata
- Family: Scincidae
- Genus: Acontias
- Species: A. percivali

Binomial name
- Acontias percivali Loveridge, 1935
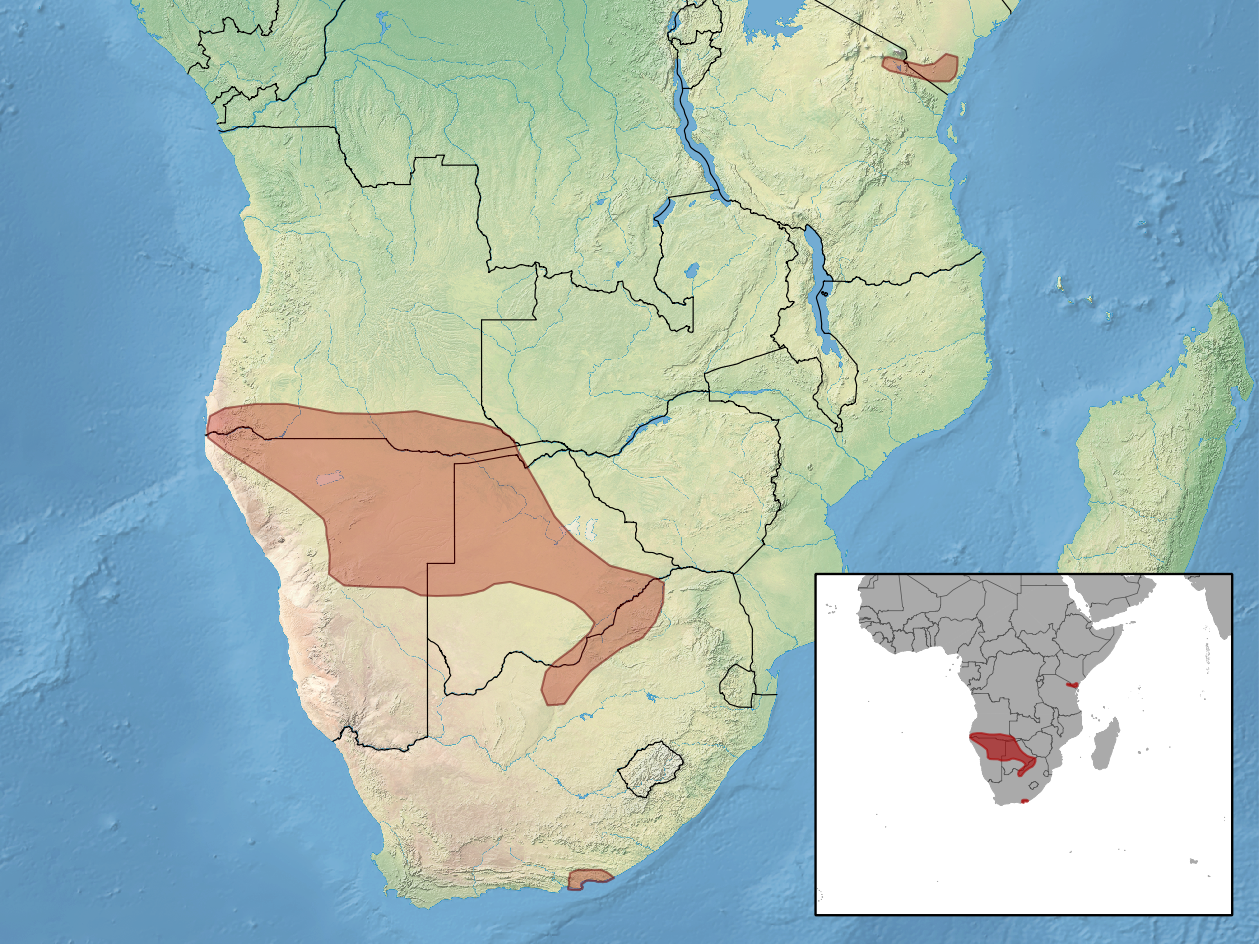

= Acontias percivali =

Species of lizard

Acontias percivali, also known commonly as Percival's lance skink, Percival's legless lizard, and the Tanzanian legless lizard, is a species of small, legless lizard in the subfamily Acontinae of the family Scincidae. The species is endemic to Africa.

== Etymology ==
The specific name, percivali, is in honor of British naturalist Arthur Blayney Percival (1874–1940), who was a game warden in East Africa.

== Geographic distribution ==
The geographic range of Acontias percivali is limited to continental Africa and includes regions of Angola, Botswana, Kenya, Namibia, South Africa, Tanzania, Democratic republic of Congo and Zimbabwe.

== Habitat ==
The preferred natural habitats of Acontias percivali are savanna and shrubland, at elevations of 500–1,000 m (1,600–3,300 ft).

== Behavior ==
Acontias percivali burrows just below the surface of the soil.

== Description ==
Percival's lance skink can be identified by its copper-brown back and gold underside.

Adults usually have a snout-to-vent length (SVL) of 18–22 cm (7.1–8.7 in). The maximum recorded SVL is 25.7 cm (10.1 in) for the female of the species, and 23.9 cm (9.4 in) for the male.

== Diet ==
Acontias percivali is an insectivores that specializes in feeding on beetle larvae, earthworms, and other slow-moving invertebrates.

== Reproduction ==
Acontias percivali bears live young by ovoviviparity. Litter size is one to five young.

== As a pet ==
Although Acontias percivali is poorly understood, it is occasionally seen in pet shops. Most Acontias specimens in the pet trade are wild-collected. In captivity, it requires a deep layer of sandy substrate and hollow hiding places on the surface. Captive breeding may be possible, but currently has not been accomplished commercially.
