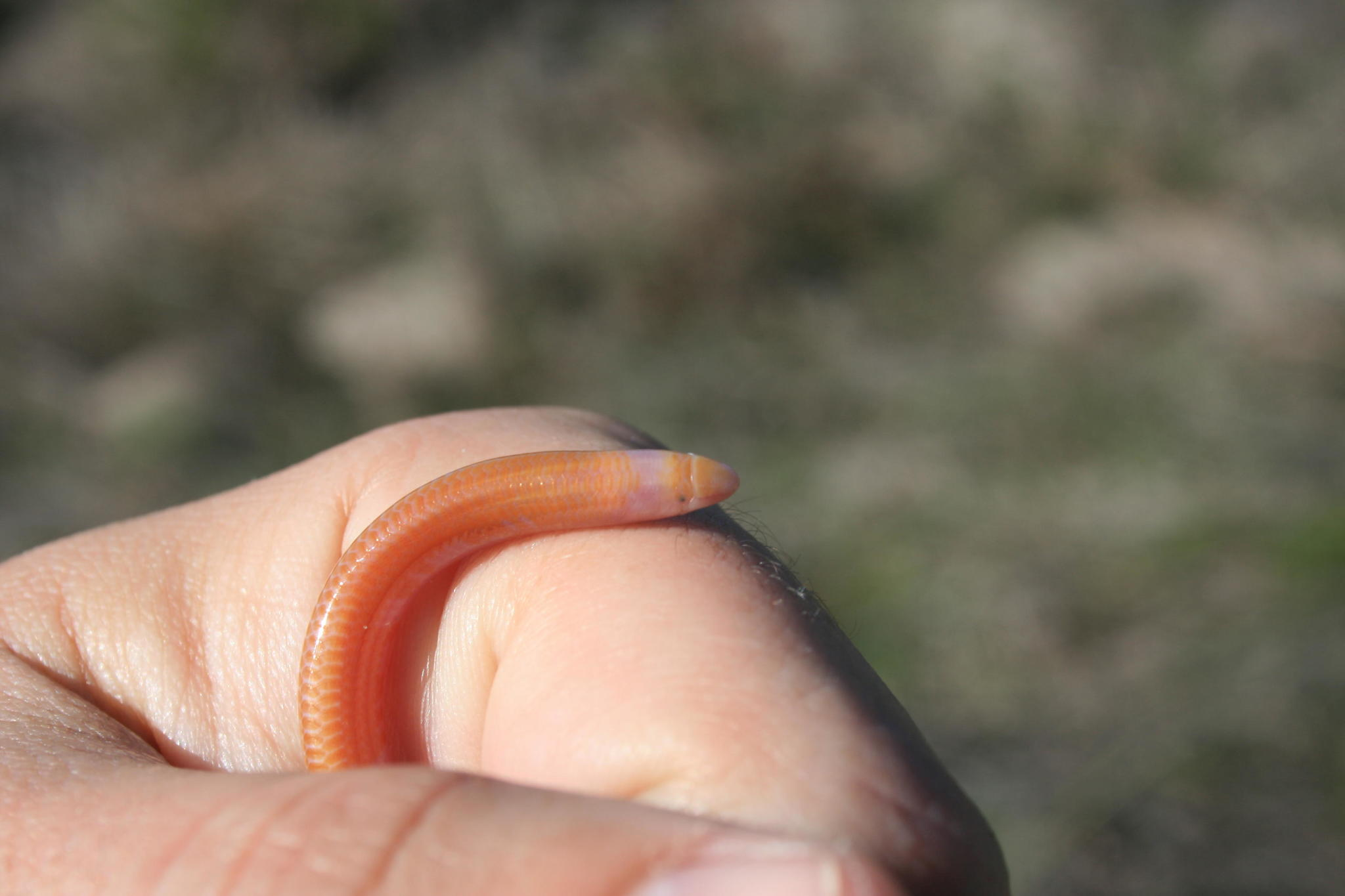
- Typhlosaurus caecus

Conservation status
- Least Concern (IUCN 3.1)

Scientific classification
- Kingdom: Animalia
- Phylum: Chordata
- Class: Reptilia
- Order: Squamata
- Family: Scincidae
- Genus: Typhlosaurus
- Species: T. caecus

Binomial name
- Typhlosaurus caecus (Cuvier, 1817)
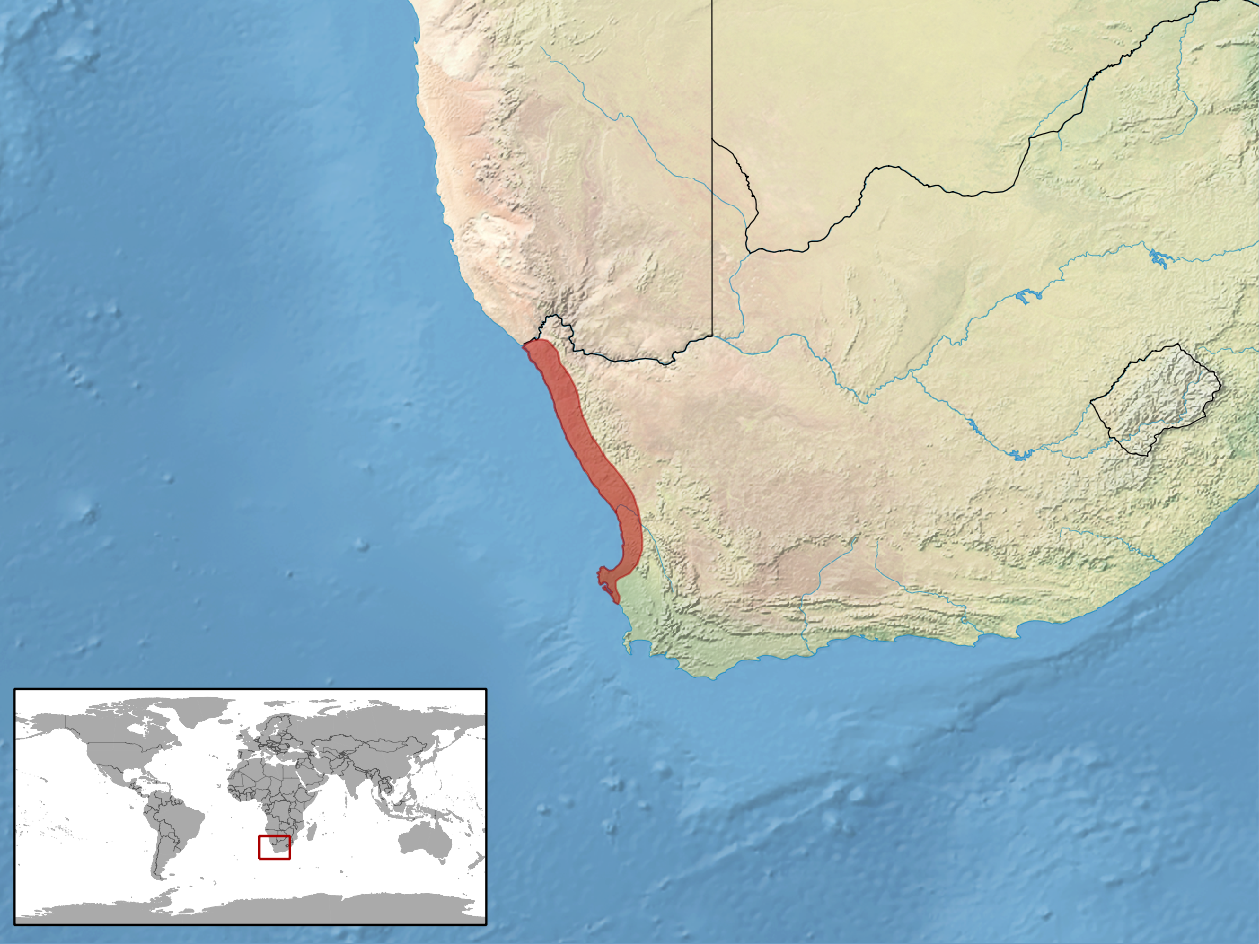

Synonyms
- Acontias caecus Cuvier, 1817

= Southern blind legless skink =

Species of lizard

The southern blind legless skink (Typhlosaurus caecus), also known commonly as Cuvier's legless skink, is a species of lizard in the subfamily Acontinae of the family Scincidae. The species is endemic to South Africa.
