= Pink blind legless skink =

Conservation status
- Least Concern (IUCN 3.1)

Scientific classification
- Kingdom: Animalia
- Phylum: Chordata
- Class: Reptilia
- Order: Squamata
- Family: Scincidae
- Genus: Typhlosaurus
- Species: T. vermis

Binomial name
- Typhlosaurus vermis Boulenger, 1887

Species of lizard

The pink blind legless skink (Typhlosaurus vermis), commonly known as Boulenger's blind legless skink or Boulenger's legless skink, is a species of lizard in the subfamily Acontinae of the family Scincidae. The species is native to southern Africa.

== Description ==
Adults of T. vermis usually have a snout-to-vent length (SVL) of 20–25 cm (7.9–9.8 in), which is long for the genus. Boulenger described the rostral and mental as "enormous", and the body scales as "tetragonal". The body color is fleshy pink.

== Geographic range ==
T. vermis is found in Namibia and South Africa.

== Habitat ==
The preferred natural habitat of T. vermis is coastal sand dunes with sparse vegetation, at altitudes from sea level to 900 m (3,000 ft).

== Reproduction ==
T. vermis is ovoviviparous. Litter size is three young.
