= Lomi's blind legless skink =

Conservation status
- Near Threatened (IUCN 3.1)

Scientific classification
- Kingdom: Animalia
- Phylum: Chordata
- Class: Reptilia
- Order: Squamata
- Family: Scincidae
- Genus: Typhlosaurus
- Species: T. lomiae

Binomial name
- Typhlosaurus lomiae Haacke, 1986

Synonyms
- Typhlosaurus lomii Haacke, 1986; Typhlosaurus lomiae — Michels & Bauer, 2004

Species of reptile

Lomi's blind legless skink (Typhlosaurus lomiae) is a species of lizard in the subfamily Acontinae of the family Scincidae. The species is endemic to Little Namaqualand in South Africa.

== Etymology ==
The specific name lomiae honours Miss Lomi Wessels Brown, Collection Manager of lower vertebrates and invertebrates at the Transvaal Museum since 1976.

== Taxonomy ==
In 1986 South African herpetologist Wulf Dietrich Haacke originally named this species Typhlosaurus lomii, which is masculine (genitive singular). In 2004 J. Pieter Michels and Aaron Matthew Bauer corrected the specific name to lomiae, which is feminine (genitive singular) because it honors a woman.

== Description ==
T. lomiae is limbless, blind, slender, and small. The usual snout-to-vent length (SVL) of adults is 10–11 cm (3.9–4.3 in). Dorsally, it is bright goldish pink, while ventrally, it is whitish and almost translucent.

== Habitat ==
The preferred habitat of T. lomiae is succulent veld with sandy soil, such as vegetated sand dunes with termite nests, at altidudes from near sea level to 100 m (330 ft).

== Reproduction ==
T. lomiae is viviparous.
