= Acontias albigularis =

Conservation status
- Data Deficient (IUCN 3.1)

Scientific classification
- Kingdom: Animalia
- Phylum: Chordata
- Class: Reptilia
- Order: Squamata
- Family: Scincidae
- Genus: Acontias
- Species: A. albigularis

Binomial name
- Acontias albigularis Conradie, Busschau, & Edwards, 2018

Species of lizard

Acontias albigularis, the white-throated legless skink, is a species of lizard in the family Scincidae. It is endemic to South Africa, where it is found under flat rocks on the montane grasslands and shrublands of the Mpumalanga escarpment. The species was originally regarded as a population of the shorthead lance skink (also called the shortheaded legless skink, Acontias breviceps).

== Description ==
A. albigularis is one of 28 recognized species within the genus Acontias. Of the legless skinks, it is considered to be medium sized.

The body is cylindrical, with a rounded, short snout. Coloration is dorsally olive to olive brown, with dark brown or black spotting on the terminal ends of the scales. Ventrally scales are a lighter olive yellow, with the exception of the regions around the throat and cloaca, which are free of pigmentation. Ventral pigmentation in juvenile specimens is not as prominent as in adults.

A. albigularis is distinguishable from other members of genus Acontias by the presence of moveable eyelids, ventral pigmentation at the posterior scale margins (giving a "checkered" appearance"), a lack of pigmentation around the throat and cloaca (hence the common name "white-throated"), and a lower average number of scales around the midbody.

== Distribution and habitat ==
A. albigularis is currently only known from the Mpumalanga escarpment at altitudes above 2000 m asl.

== Ecology and behavior ==
Little is known about the breeding habits of A. albigularis. The presence of an 85 mm juvenile collected from Long Tom Pass in December 2013 suggests that breeding may take place in the summer months, from September onwards.
