= Meyer's blind legless skink =

Conservation status
- Least Concern (IUCN 3.1)

Scientific classification
- Kingdom: Animalia
- Phylum: Chordata
- Class: Reptilia
- Order: Squamata
- Family: Scincidae
- Genus: Typhlosaurus
- Species: T. meyeri

Binomial name
- Typhlosaurus meyeri Boettger, 1894

Synonyms
- Typhlosaurus plowesi V. FitzSimons, 1943

Species of lizard

Meyer's blind legless skink (Typhlosaurus meyeri), also commonly known as Meyer's legless skink, and the variable blind legless skink, is a species of lizard in the subfamily Acontinae of the family Scincidae. The species is native to southern Africa.

== Etymology ==
The specific name meyeri, is in honor of German ornithologist Adolf Bernhard Meyer.

== Description ==
Adults of Typhlosaurus meyeri usually have a snout-to-vent length (SVL) of 12–16 cm (4.7–6.3 in). The maximum recorded SVL is 18.8 cm (7.4 in).

== Geographic distribution ==
Typhlosaurus meyeri is found in extreme southwestern Namibia and adjacent extreme northwestern South Africa.

== Habitat ==
The preferred natural habitat of Typhlosaurus meyeri is sandy desert, at elevations of 50–400 m (160–1,310 ft).

== Reproduction ==
Typhlosaurus meyeri is ovoviviparous.
