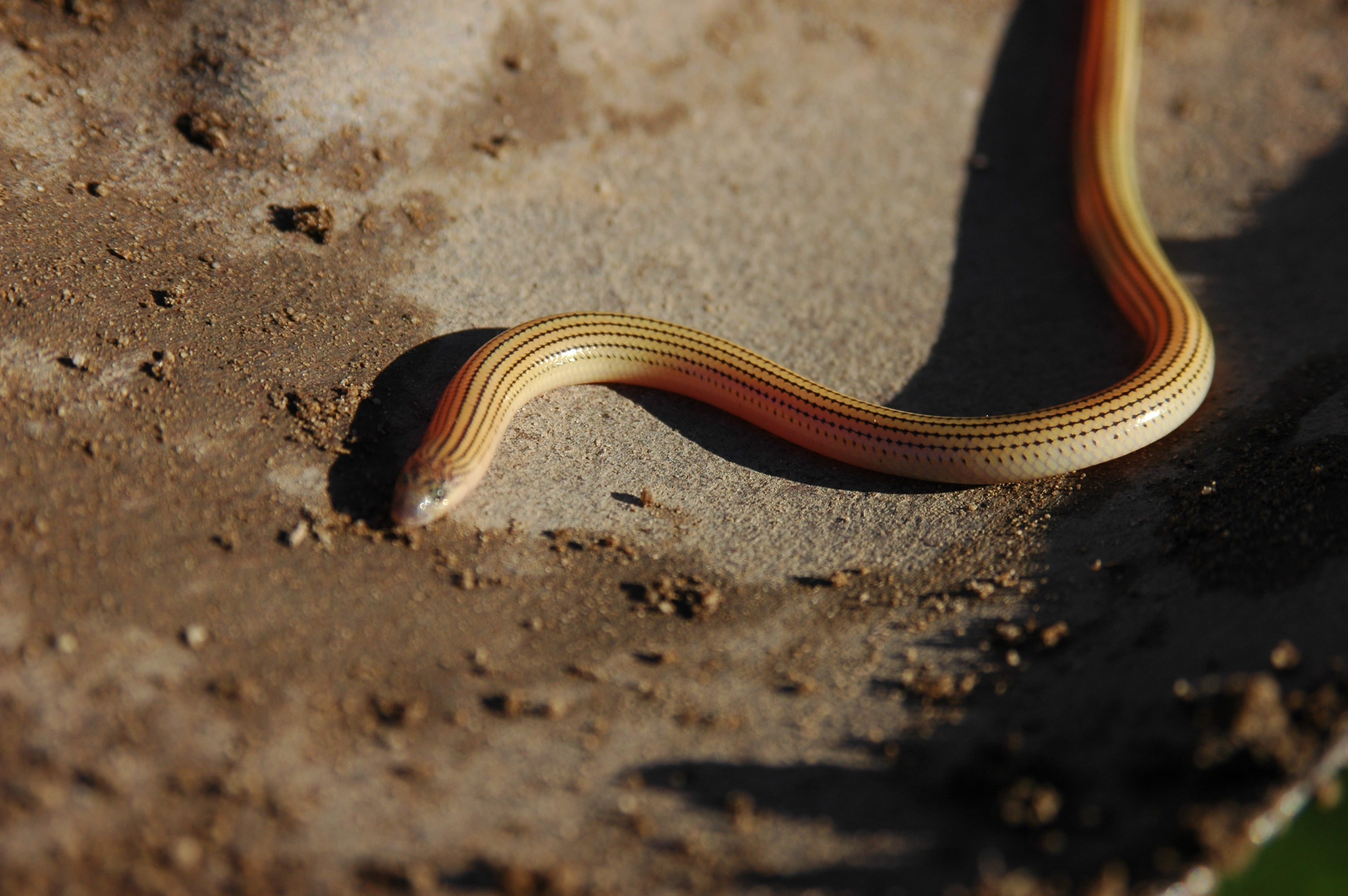

Conservation status
- Least Concern (IUCN 3.1)

Scientific classification
- Kingdom: Animalia
- Phylum: Chordata
- Class: Reptilia
- Order: Squamata
- Suborder: Scinciformata
- Infraorder: Scincomorpha
- Family: Acontidae
- Genus: Acontias
- Species: A. orientalis

Binomial name
- Acontias orientalis Hewitt, 1938

= Acontias orientalis =

Species of lizard

Acontias orientalis, the Eastern striped blindworm or Eastern Cape legless skink, is a species of lizard in the family Scincidae. It is endemic to South Africa.

== Habitat ==
Burrowing species, discovered in coastal regions and sediment-rich soils within inland valleys, thriving in environments ranging from moderately moist to somewhat arid conditions.
