= Haacke's legless skink =

Conservation status
- Least Concern (IUCN 3.1)

Scientific classification
- Kingdom: Animalia
- Phylum: Chordata
- Class: Reptilia
- Order: Squamata
- Family: Scincidae
- Genus: Typhlosaurus
- Species: T. braini

Binomial name
- Typhlosaurus braini Haacke, 1964

Species of lizard

Haacke's legless skink (Typhlosaurus braini), also known commonly as Brain's legless skink and Brain's blind legless skink, is a species of lizard in the family Scincidae. The species is endemic to Namibia.

== Etymology ==
The specific name, braini, is in honor of paleontologist Charles Kimberlin Brain.

== Habitat ==
The preferred natural habitat of T. braini is desert, at altitudes of 50–400 m (160–1,310 ft).

== Description ==
T. braini is limbless, slender, and uniformly light pink. Adults have a snout-to-vent length (SVL) of 15–20 cm (5.9–7.9 in).

== Behavior ==
Having no limbs, T. braini "swims" in sand dunes, both under the surface and at the surface.

== Diet ==
The diet of T. braini consists of termites and insect larvae.

== Reproduction ==
T. braini is viviparous.

== Predators ==
T. braini is preyed upon by the Namib golden mole (Eremitalpa granti namibensis).
