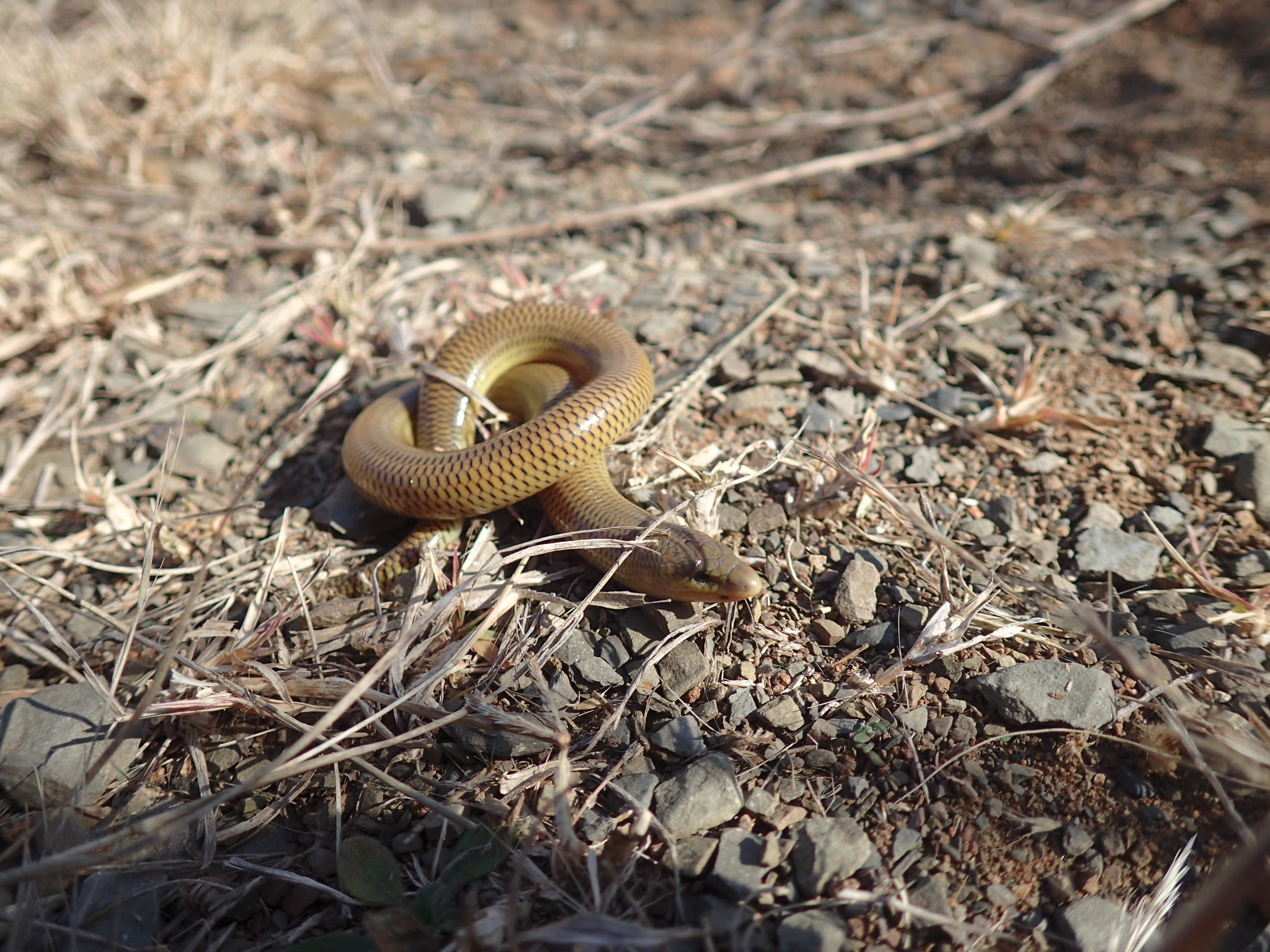

Conservation status
- Least Concern (IUCN 3.1)

Scientific classification
- Kingdom: Animalia
- Phylum: Chordata
- Class: Reptilia
- Order: Squamata
- Family: Scincidae
- Genus: Acontias
- Species: A. gracilicauda

Binomial name
- Acontias gracilicauda Essex, 1925
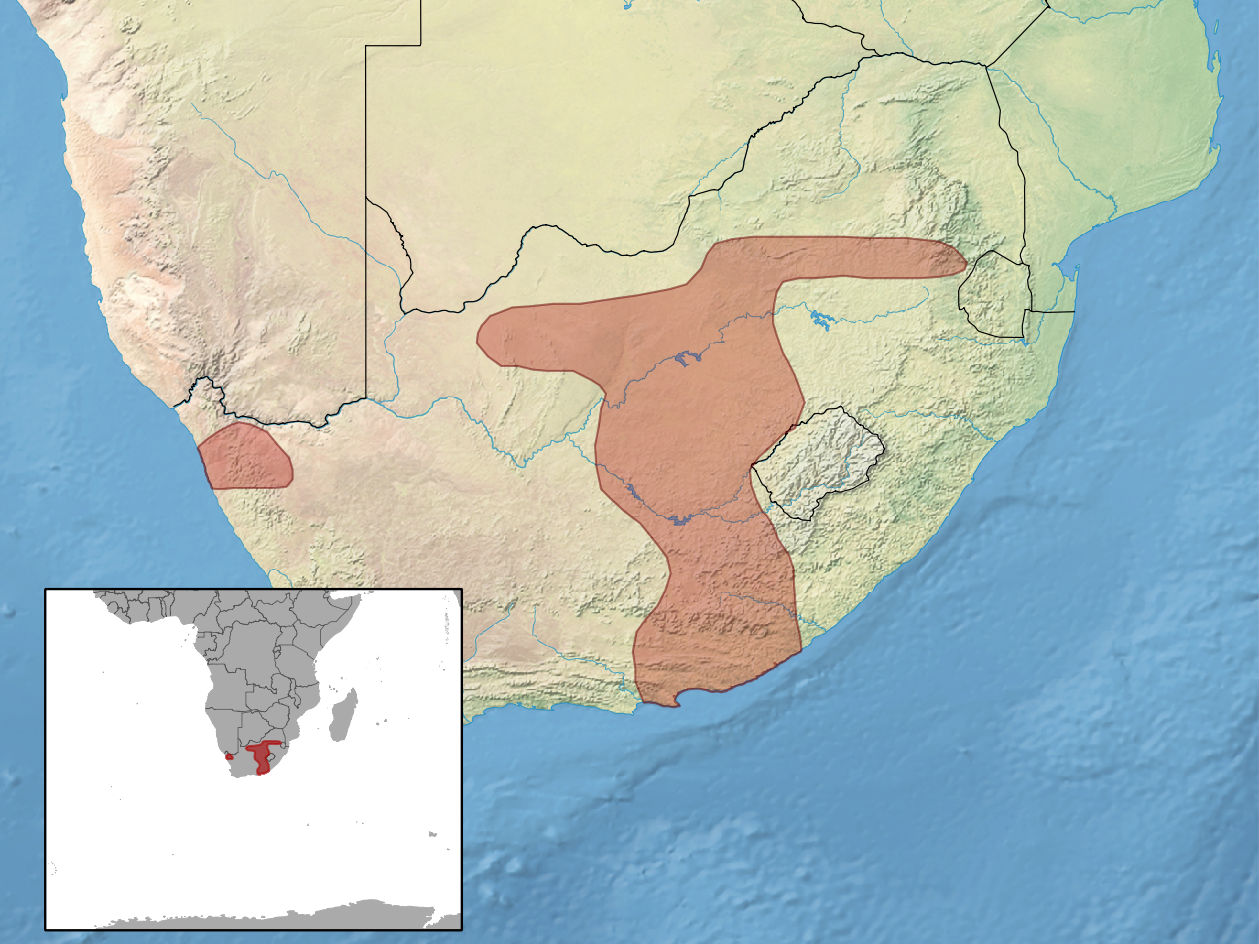
- Approximate range of Acontias gracilicauda. The disjunct, western component is now considered a distinct species, Acontias namaquensis.

= Acontias gracilicauda =

Species of lizard

Acontias gracilicauda, the slendertail lance skink or thin-tailed legless skink, is a species of skink. It is found in the Republic of South Africa (Eastern Cape Province, Mpumalanga, Free State, North-West Province, Gauteng, KwaZulu-Natal) and Lesotho. Acontias namaquensis was formerly included in this species as a subspecies, but is now recognized as a distinct species.

== Description ==
Adult males measure on average 152 mm (6.0 in) and adult females 179 mm (7.0 in) in snout–vent length. It has no limbs, like other members of its genus.
