= Acontias occidentalis =

Conservation status
- Least Concern (IUCN 3.1)

Scientific classification
- Domain: Eukaryota
- Kingdom: Animalia
- Phylum: Chordata
- Class: Reptilia
- Order: Squamata
- Family: Scincidae
- Genus: Acontias
- Species: A. occidentalis

Binomial name
- Acontias occidentalis FitzSimons, 1941

Species of lizard

Acontias occidentalis, the western burrowing skink or savanna legless skink, is a species of lizard in the family Scincidae. It is found in Namibia, Zimbabwe, Angola, and South Africa.
