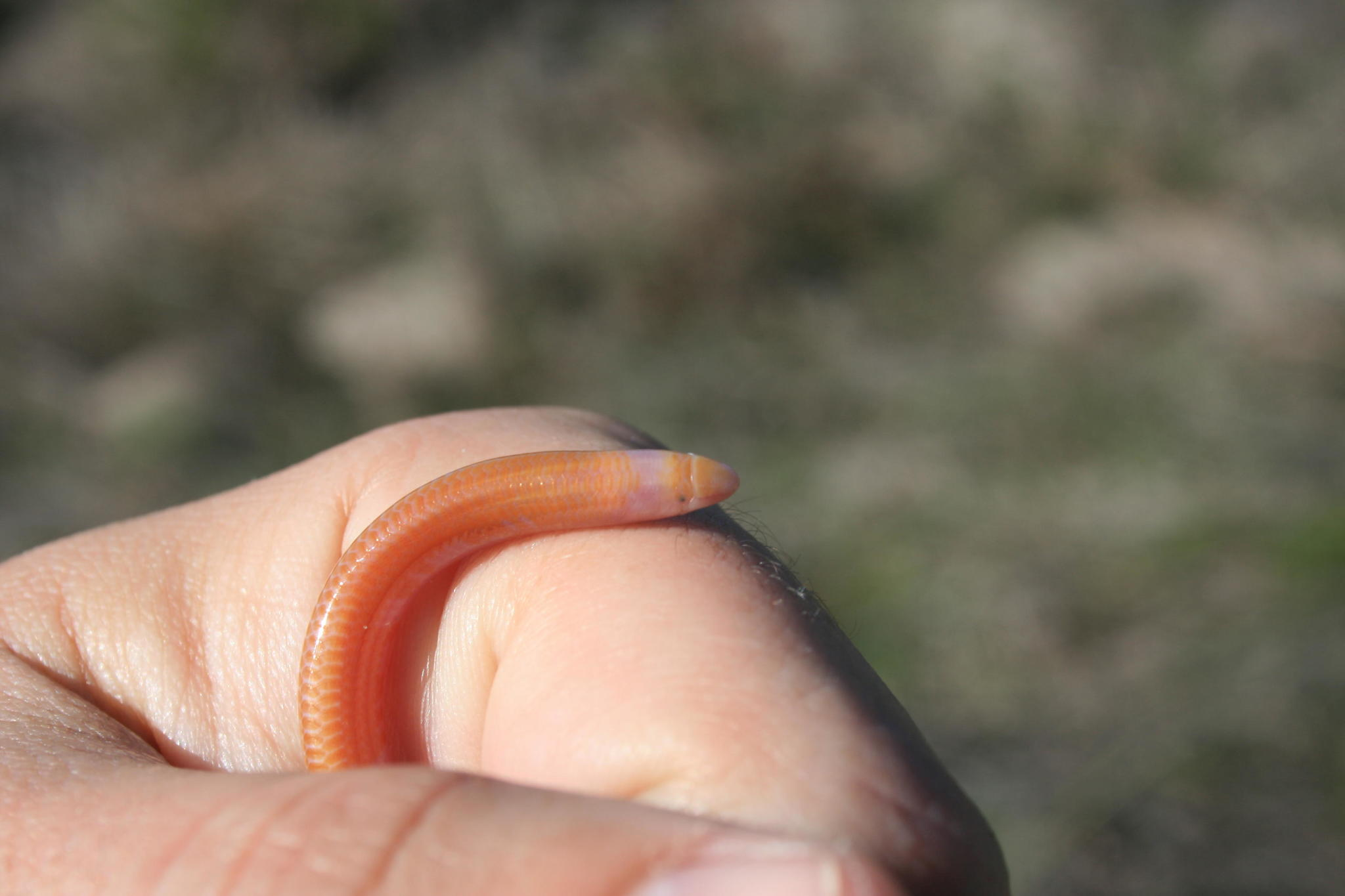
- Typhlosaurus caecus

Scientific classification
- Kingdom: Animalia
- Phylum: Chordata
- Class: Reptilia
- Order: Squamata
- Family: Scincidae
- Subfamily: Acontinae
- Genus: Typhlosaurus; Wiegmann, 1834

= Typhlosaurus =

Genus of lizards

Typhlosaurus is a genus of African lizards, one of a number of genera of limbless lizards in the skink family (Scincidae). In 2010 this group was revised, and most species formerly attributed to Typhlosaurus were placed in the genus Acontias. As of 2025 the definition of Typhlosaurus includes five attenuate body legless lizards from southwestern Africa (South Africa, Namibia, Botswana, and Angola). This is the sister genus to Acontias, which together form the well supported Afrotropical subfamily Acontinae.

== Species ==
Five species are recognized as being valid.

- Typhlosaurus braini Haacke, 1964 – Haacke's legless skink, Brain's legless skink, Brain's blind legless skink
- Typhlosaurus caecus (Cuvier, 1817) – southern blind legless skink, Cuvier's legless skink
- Typhlosaurus lomiae Haacke, 1986 – Lomi's blind legless skink
- Typhlosaurus meyeri Boettger, 1894 – Meyer's blind legless skink, variable blind legless skink
- Typhlosaurus vermis Boulenger, 1887 – Boulenger's legless skink, pink blind legless skink

Nota bene: A binomial authority in parentheses indicates that the species was originally described in a genus other than Typhlosaurus.
