= Acontias gariepensis =

Conservation status
- Least Concern (IUCN 3.1)

Scientific classification
- Kingdom: Animalia
- Phylum: Chordata
- Class: Reptilia
- Order: Squamata
- Family: Scincidae
- Genus: Acontias
- Species: A. gariepensis

Binomial name
- Acontias gariepensis (FitzSimons, 1941)

Synonyms
- Typhlosaurus gariepensis FitzSimons, 1941

Species of lizard

Acontias gariepensis, the Mier Kalahari legless skink, is a species of lizard in the family Scincidae. It is found in Namibia, Botswana, and South Africa.
