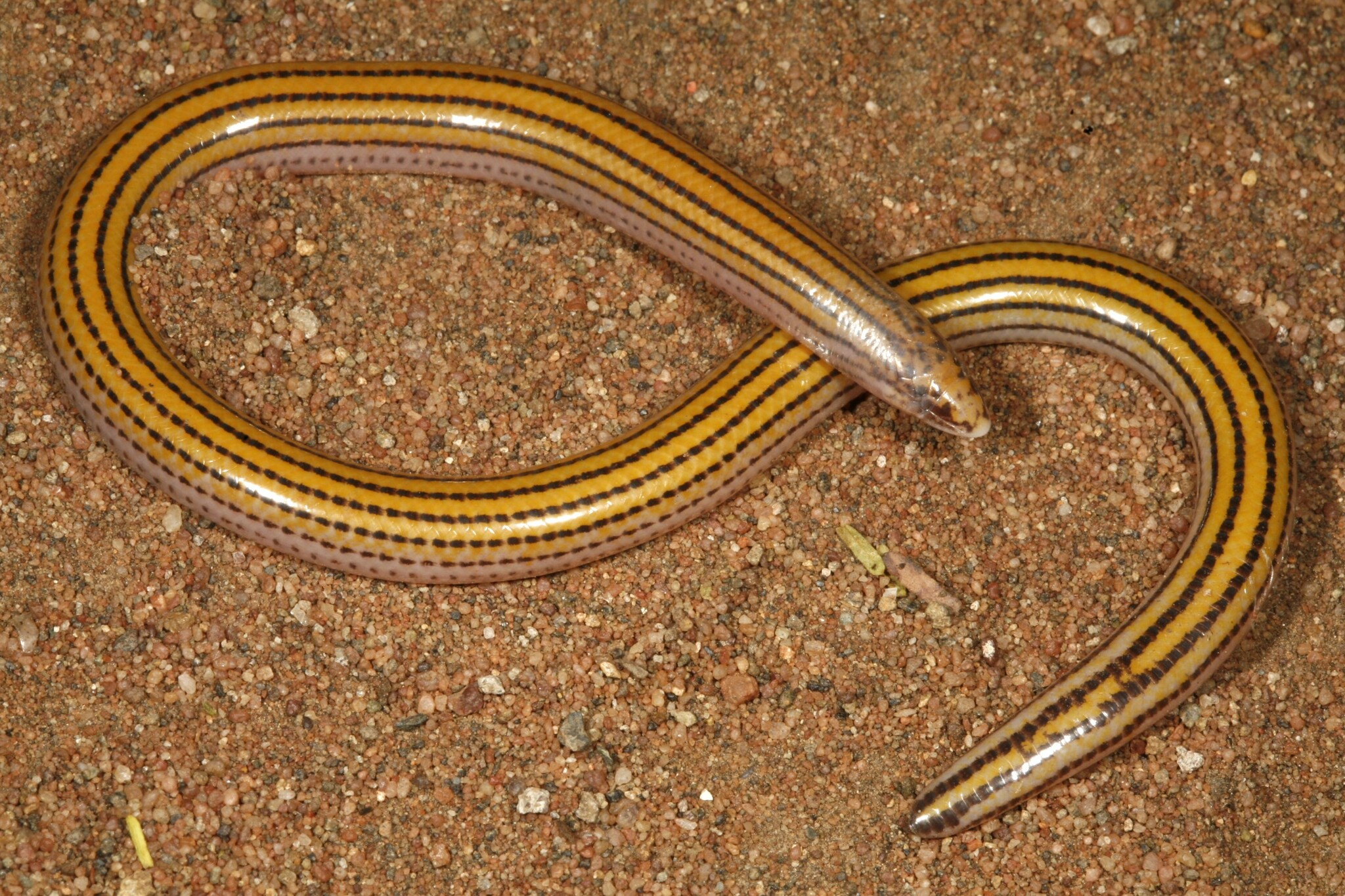

Conservation status
- Near Threatened (IUCN 3.1)

Scientific classification
- Kingdom: Animalia
- Phylum: Chordata
- Class: Reptilia
- Order: Squamata
- Suborder: Scinciformata
- Infraorder: Scincomorpha
- Family: Acontidae
- Genus: Acontias
- Species: A. richardi

Binomial name
- Acontias richardi (Jacobsen, 1987)
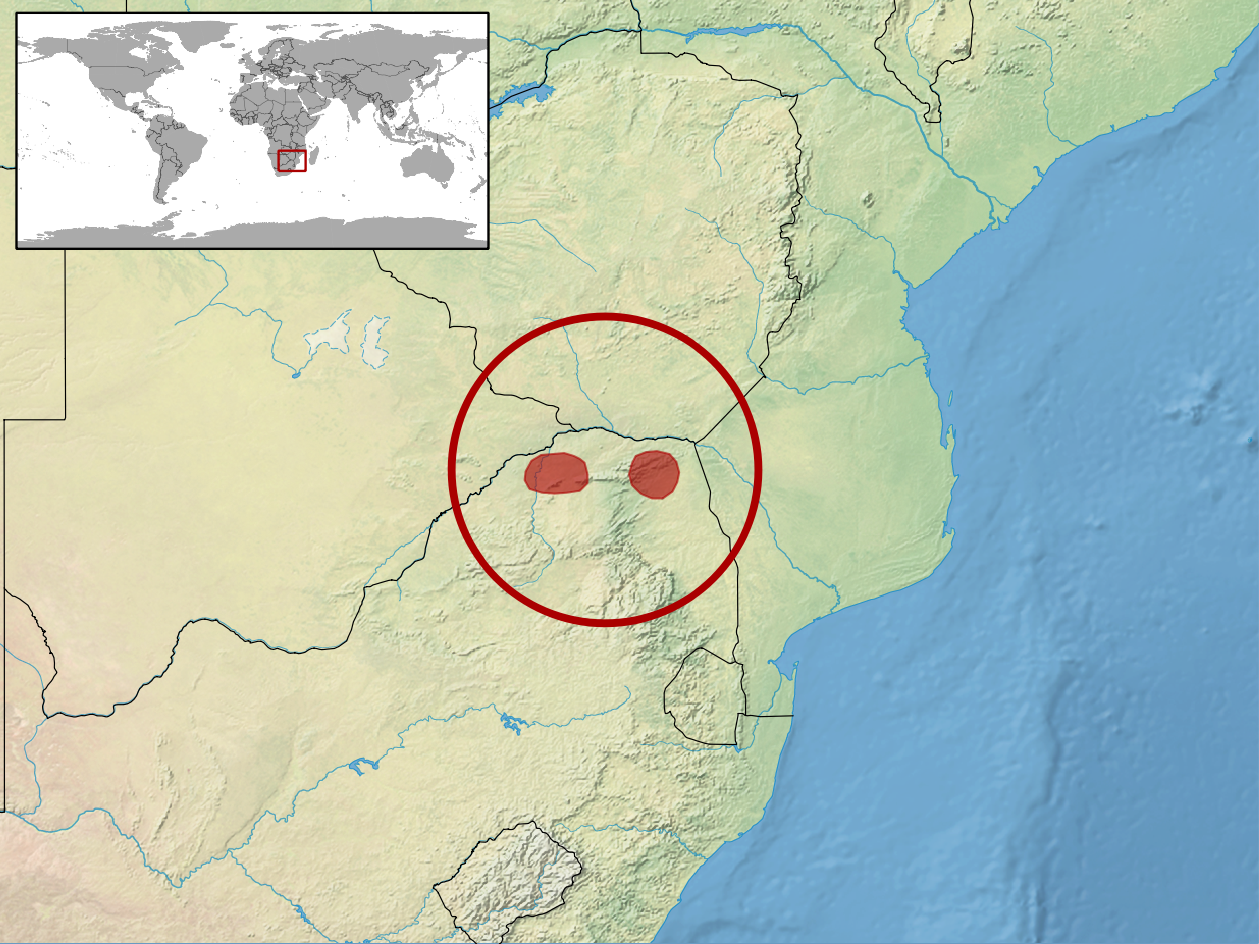

= Acontias richardi =

Species of lizard

Acontias richardi, commonly known as Richard's legless skink, is a species of lizard in the family Scincidae. It is endemic to South Africa.
