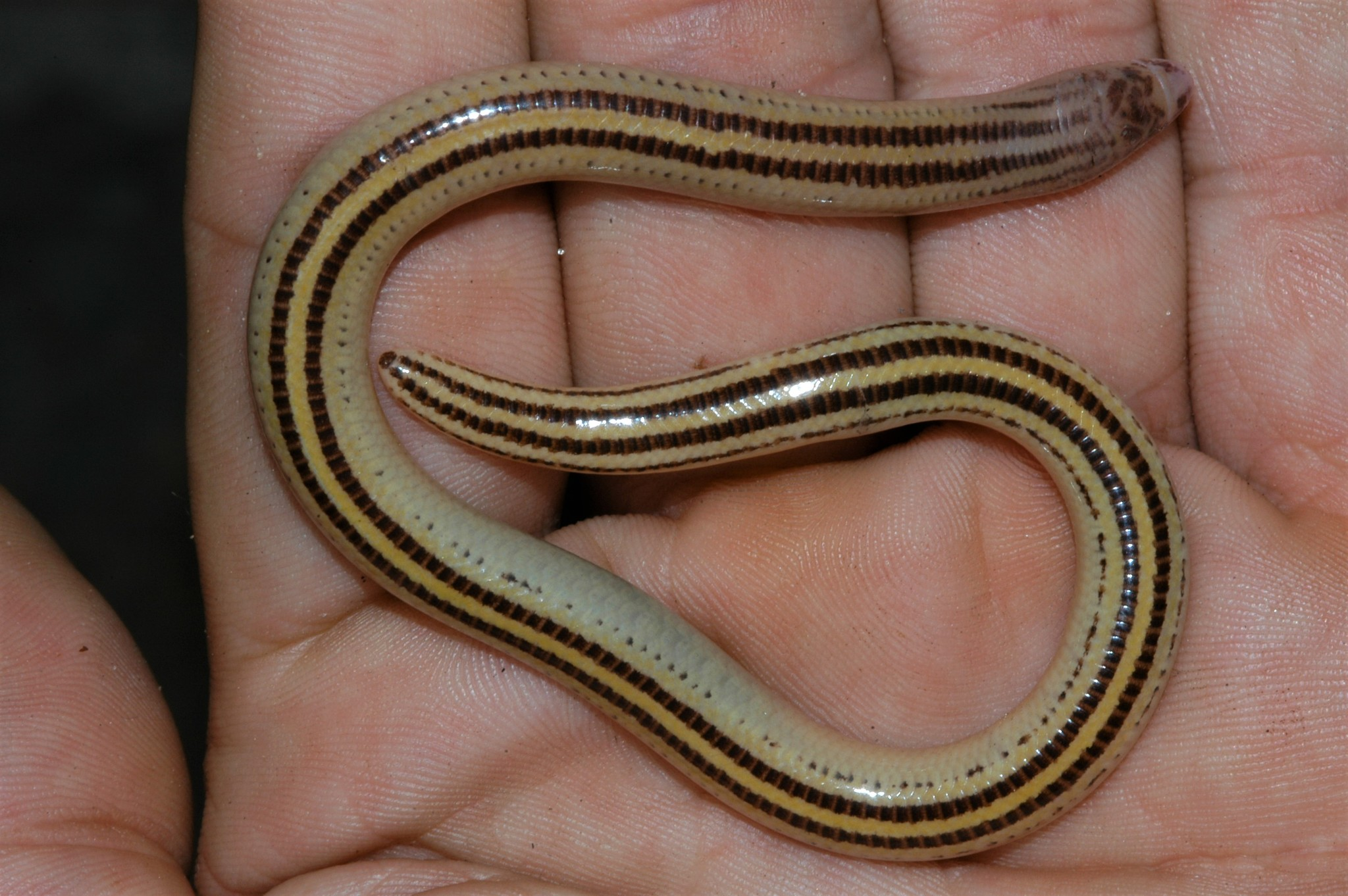

Conservation status
- Least Concern (IUCN 3.1)

Scientific classification
- Domain: Eukaryota
- Kingdom: Animalia
- Phylum: Chordata
- Class: Reptilia
- Order: Squamata
- Family: Scincidae
- Genus: Acontias
- Species: A. jappi

Binomial name
- Acontias jappi (Broadley, 1968)

= Acontias jappi =

Species of lizard

Acontias jappi, Japp's burrowing skink, is a species of lizard in the family Scincidae. It is found in western Zambia and eastern Angola.
