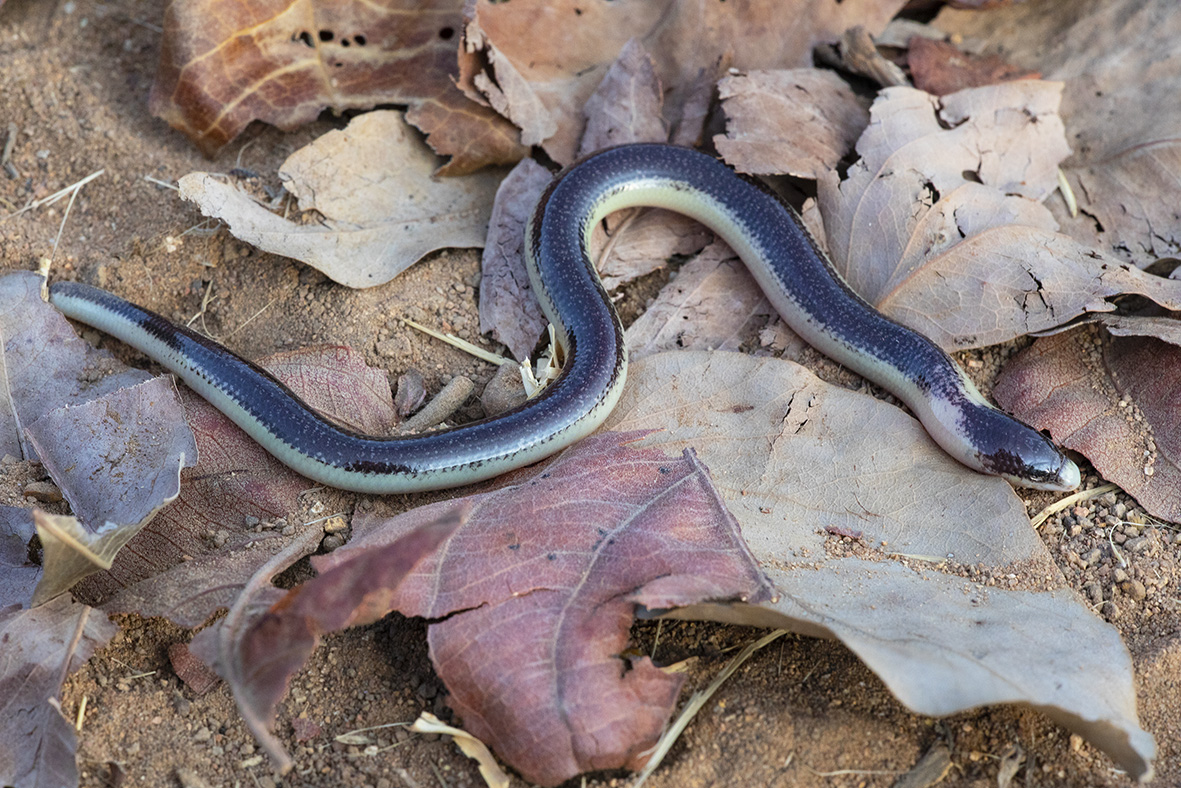
- Acontias mukwando

Scientific classification
- Kingdom: Animalia
- Phylum: Chordata
- Class: Reptilia
- Order: Squamata
- Family: Scincidae
- Subfamily: Acontinae
- Genus: Acontias; Cuvier, 1817

Species
- See text.

= Acontias =

Genus of lizards

Acontias is a genus of limbless skinks, the lance skinks, (family Scincidae) in the African subfamily Acontinae. Most are small animals, but the largest member of the genus is Acontias plumbeus at approximately 40 cm (16 in) snout-vent length. All members of this genus are live-bearing sandswimmers, with fused eyelids. A recent review moved species that were formerly placed in the genera Typhlosaurus, Acontophiops, and Microacontias into this genus, as together these form a single branch in the tree of life. This new concept of Acontias is a sister lineage to Typhlosaurus, and these two genera are the only genera within the subfamily Acontinae.

== Species ==
These 24 species are recognized:

- Acontias albigularis Conradie, Busschau, & Edwards, 2018 – white-throated legless skink
- Acontias aurantiacus (W. Peters, 1854) – golden blind legless skink
- Acontias bicolor (Hewitt, 1929)
- Acontias breviceps Essex, 1925 – shorthead lance skink
- Acontias cregoi (Boulenger, 1903) – Cregoe's legless skink
- Acontias fitzsimonsi (Broadley, 1968) – Fitzsimons's legless skink
- Acontias gariepensis (V. FitzSimons, 1941) – Mier Kalahari legless skink
- Acontias gracilicauda Essex, 1925 – thin-tailed legless skink, slendertail lance skink
- Acontias jappi (Broadley, 1968) – Japp’s burrowing skink
- Acontias kgalagadi (Lamb, Biswas & Bauer, 2010) – Kalahari burrowing skink, Kgalagadi legless skink
- Acontias lineatus W. Peters, 1879 – striped dwarf legless skink, lined lance skink
- Acontias meleagris (Linnaeus, 1758) – Cape legless skink, golden sand skink; spotted slow skink; thick-tailed blindworm, erdslang, Linnaeus's lance skink
- Acontias mukwando Marques, Parrinha, Tiutenko, Lopes-Lima, Bauer & Ceríaco, 2023 – Serra da Neve lance-skink
- Acontias namaquensis Hewitt, 1938 – Namaqua legless skink, Namaqua lance skink
- Acontias occidentalis V. FitzSimons, 1941 – western burrowing skink, savanna legless skink
- Acontias orientalis Hewitt, 1938 – eastern striped blindworm, Eastern Cape legless skink
- Acontias parietalis (Broadley, 1990) – Maputaland legless skink
- Acontias percivali Loveridge, 1935 – Percival's lance skink, Teita limbless skink
- Acontias plumbeus Bianconi, 1849 – giant legless skink, giant lance skink
- Acontias richardi (Jacobsen, 1987) – Richard’s legless skink
- Acontias rieppeli (Lamb, Biswas & Bauer, 2010) – Woodbush legless skink
- Acontias schmitzi Wagner, Broadley & Bauer, 2012
- Acontias subtaeniatus (Broadley, 1968) – stripe-bellied legless skink
- Acontias wakkerstroomensis Conradie, Busschau, & Edwards, 2018 – Wakkerstroom legless skink

Nota bene: A binomial authority in parentheses indicates the species was originally described in a genus other than Acontias.

== Gallery ==
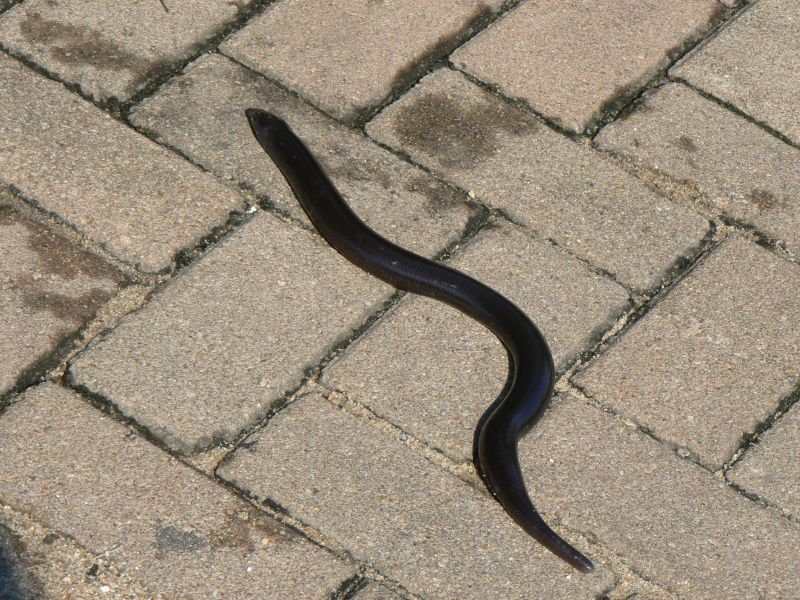
Acontias plumbeus

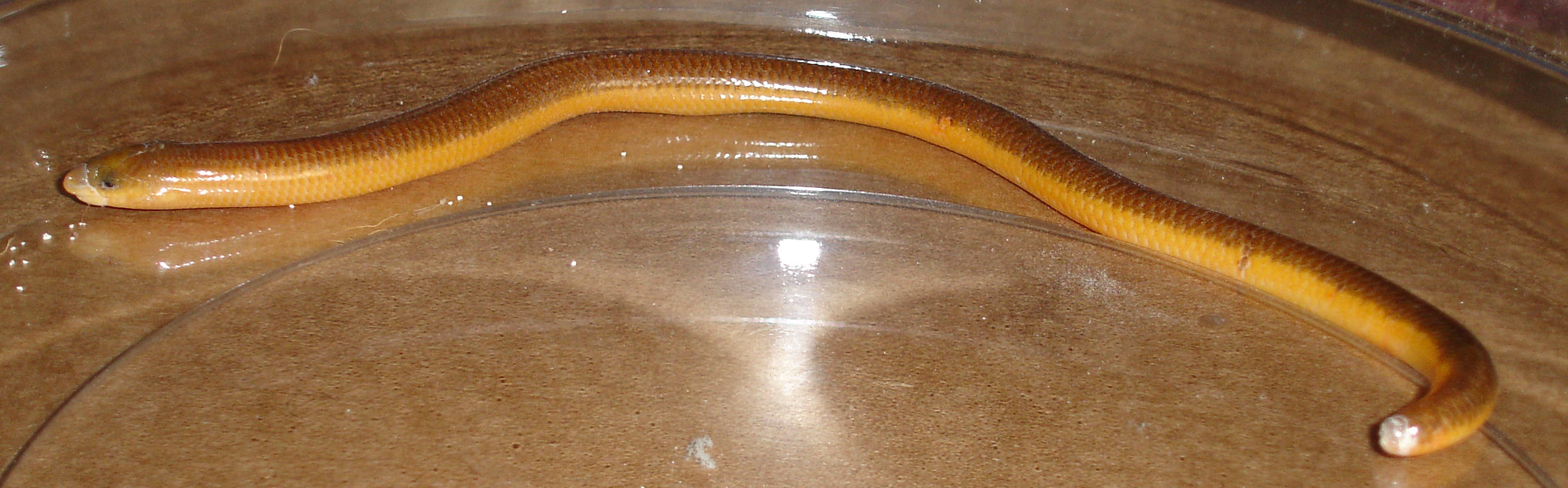
Acontias percivali
