= Acontias schmitzi =

Conservation status
- Least Concern (IUCN 3.1)

Scientific classification
- Kingdom: Animalia
- Phylum: Chordata
- Class: Reptilia
- Order: Squamata
- Family: Scincidae
- Genus: Acontias
- Species: A. schmitzi

Binomial name
- Acontias schmitzi Wagner, Broadley, & Bauer, 2012

Species of lizard

Acontias schmitzi is a species of lizard in the family Scincidae. It is endemic to Zambia.

== Description ==
The holotype of Acontias schmitzi measures 190 mm (7.5 in) in total length. The species has a dark dorsal surface and a pale ventral surface. It is a legless lizard.
