= Acontias bicolor =

Conservation status
- Least Concern (IUCN 3.1)

Scientific classification
- Kingdom: Animalia
- Phylum: Chordata
- Class: Reptilia
- Order: Squamata
- Family: Scincidae
- Genus: Acontias
- Species: A. bicolor

Binomial name
- Acontias bicolor (Hewitt, 1929)

Synonyms
- Typhlosaurus cregoi bicolor Hewitt, 1929

Species of lizard

Acontias bicolor is a species of lizard in the family Scincidae. It is endemic to Zimbabwe.
