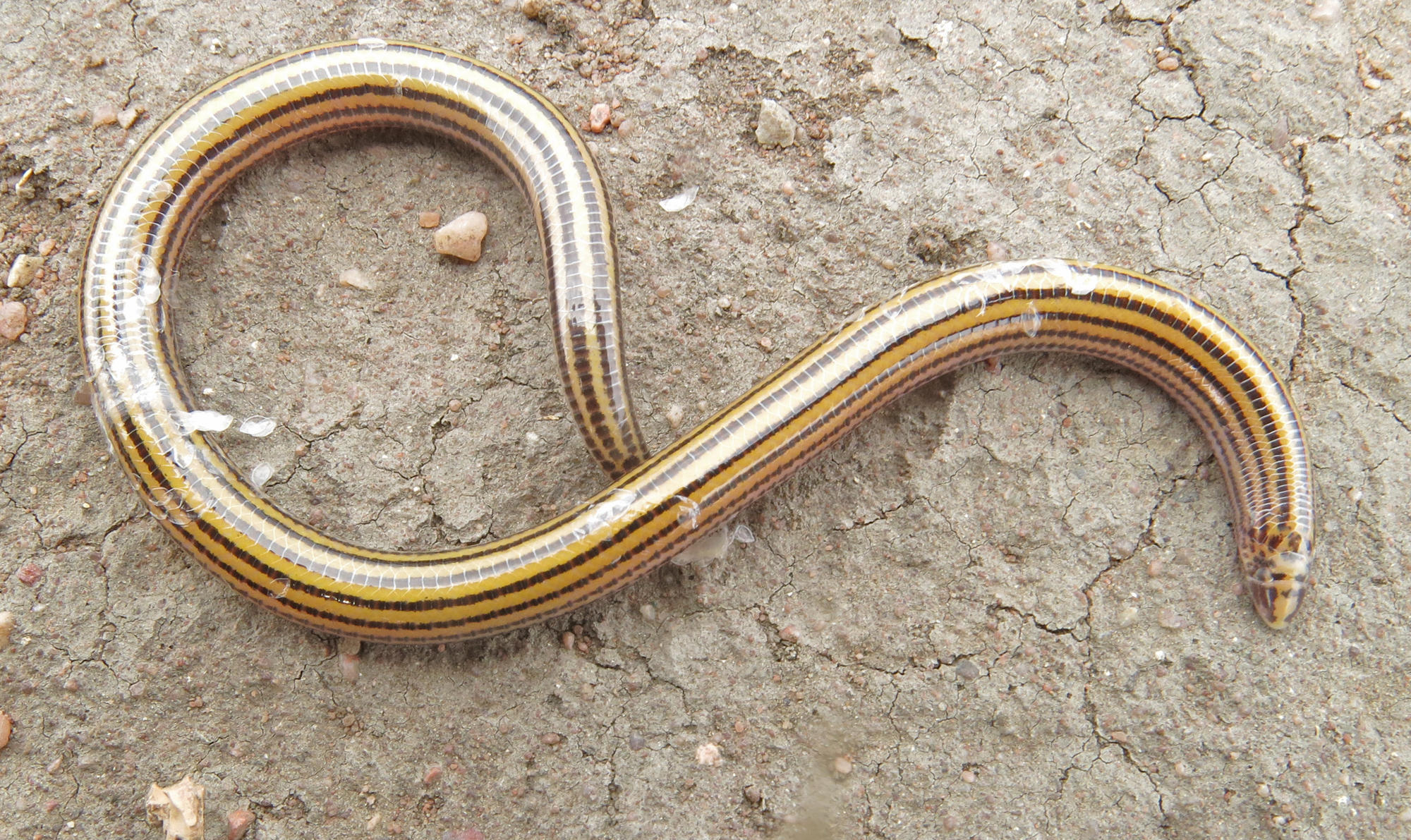

Scientific classification
- Kingdom: Animalia
- Phylum: Chordata
- Class: Reptilia
- Order: Squamata
- Family: Scincidae
- Genus: Acontias
- Species: A. subtaeniatus

Binomial name
- Acontias subtaeniatus (Broadley, 1968)

= Acontias subtaeniatus =

Species of lizard

Acontias subtaeniatus, the stripe-bellied legless skink, is a species of lizard in the family Scincidae. It is found in South Africa.They inhabit sandy areas and burrow under sand and debris. They feed on small subterranean insects or invertibrae.They are close relatives to the Kgalagadi legless skink
