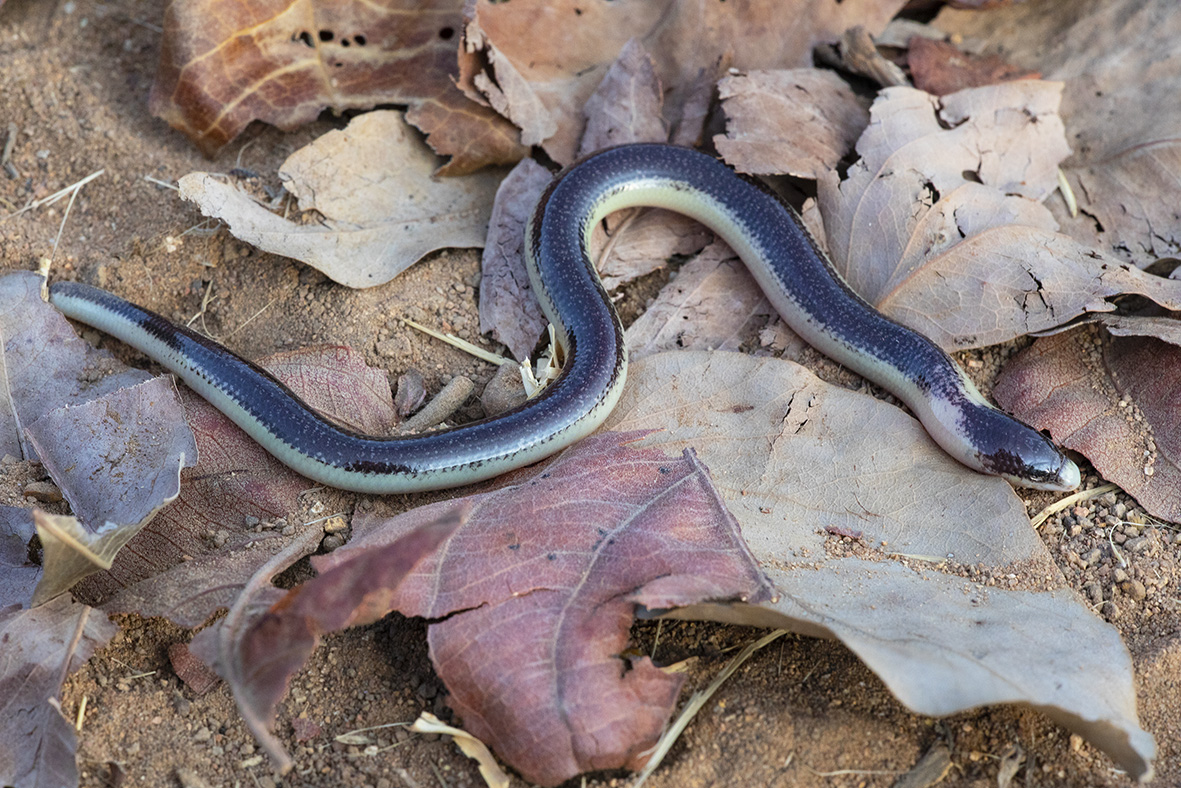

Scientific classification
- Kingdom: Animalia
- Phylum: Chordata
- Class: Reptilia
- Order: Squamata
- Family: Scincidae
- Genus: Acontias
- Species: A. mukwando

Binomial name
- Acontias mukwando Marques, Parrinha, Tiutenko, Lopes-Lima, Bauer & Ceríaco, 2023

= Acontias mukwando =

Serra da Neve lance-skink

Species of lizard

Acontias mukwando, the Serra da Neve lance-skink, is a species of lizard in the family Scincidae. It is only known to exist in Serra da Neve in the Angolan Namibe province. The species was first documented by Mariana P. Marques, Diogo Parrinha, Arthur Tiutenko, Manuel Lopes-Lima, Aaron M. Bauer & Luis M. P. Ceríaco in 2023.

== Description ==
Acontias mukwando is a medium-sized member of the genus Acontias measuring a length of 172.2 mm (6.77 in). The species lacks limbs or ear openings and is distinguished for other member of Acontias by its exposed eyes and 3 chin shields. It has pink body pigmentation with dark dorsal pigmentation and a dark brown band that runs the mid-dorsal region. Its midbody scale row numbers between 15 and 18 scales with 172-178 ventral scales.

== Habitat ==
Acontias mukwando inhabits the Serra da Neve inselberg in Namibe province, southwestern Angola. It is known to forage in the leaf litter of the Miombo forest which dominates the Serra da Neve inselberg area.

== Etymology ==
Acontias mukwando is named for the noun "mukwando" in honor of the Catchi villagers of Serra da Neve inselberg, who provided assistance to the team that first documented it.
