= Acontias wakkerstroomensis =

Conservation status
- Data Deficient (IUCN 3.1)

Scientific classification
- Kingdom: Animalia
- Phylum: Chordata
- Class: Reptilia
- Order: Squamata
- Family: Scincidae
- Genus: Acontias
- Species: A. wakkerstroomensis

Binomial name
- Acontias wakkerstroomensis Conradie, Busschau, & Edwards, 2018

Species of lizard

Acontias wakkerstroomensis, the Wakkerstroom legless skink, is a species of lizard in the family Scincidae. It is endemic to South Africa.
