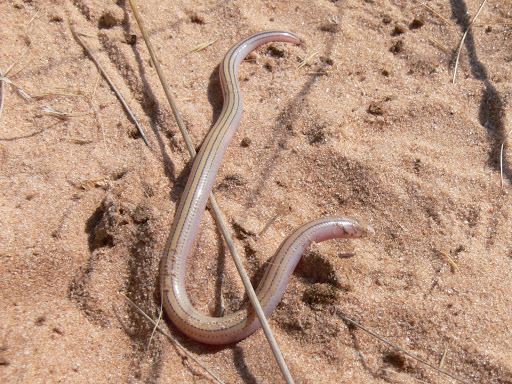

Conservation status
- Least Concern (IUCN 3.1)

Scientific classification
- Kingdom: Animalia
- Phylum: Chordata
- Class: Reptilia
- Order: Squamata
- Family: Scincidae
- Genus: Acontias
- Species: A. kgalagadi

Binomial name
- Acontias kgalagadi Lamb, Biswas & Bauer, 2010
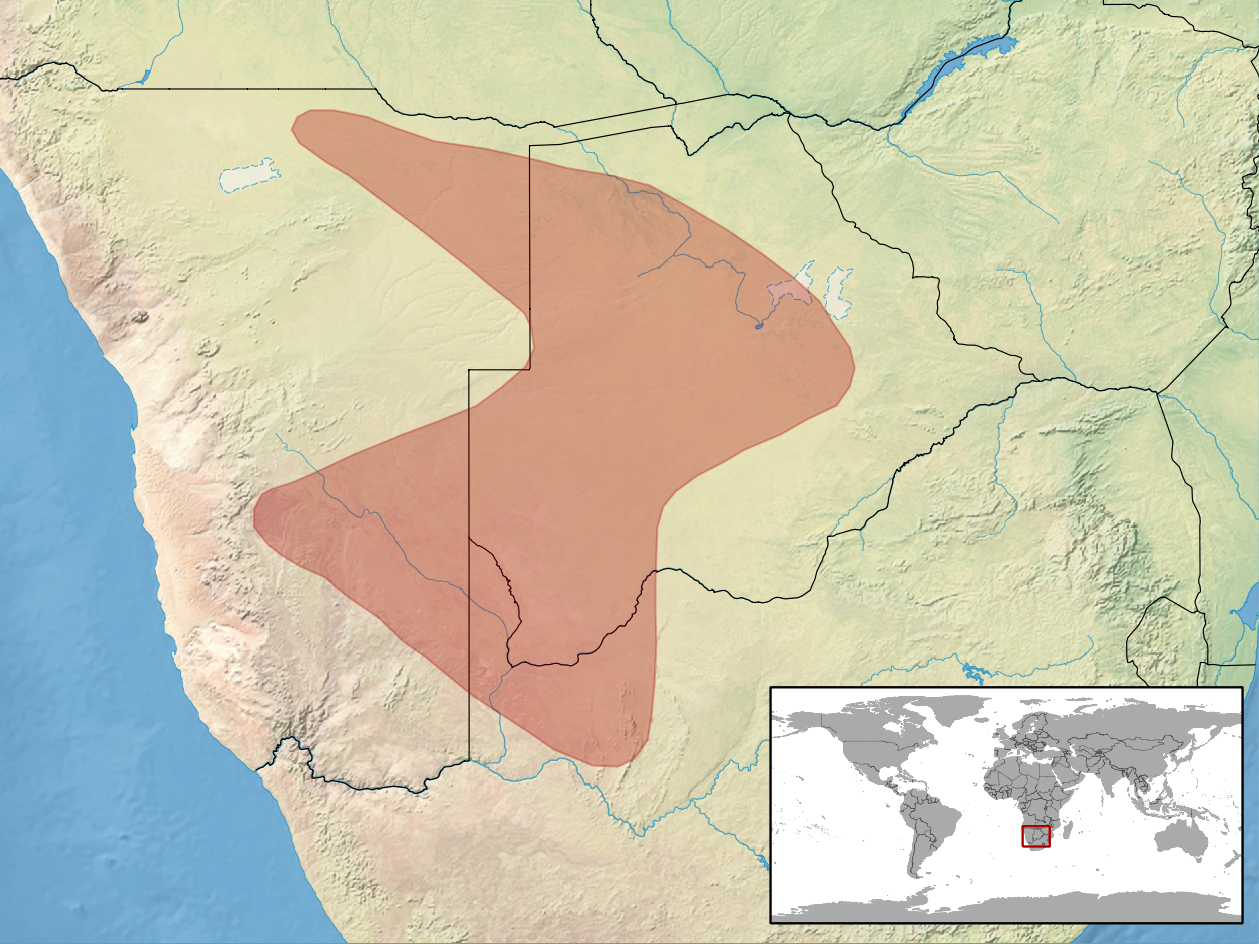

Synonyms
- Typhlosaurus lineatus Boulenger, 1887; Acontias kgalagadi Lamb, Biswas & Bauer, 2010 – replacement name

= Acontias kgalagadi =

Species of lizard

Acontias kgalagadi, the Kalahari burrowing skink or Kgalagadi legless skink, is a species of lizard in the family Scincidae. It is found in Namibia, Botswana, South Africa, and Angola.It is closely related to the Acontias subtaeniatus.
