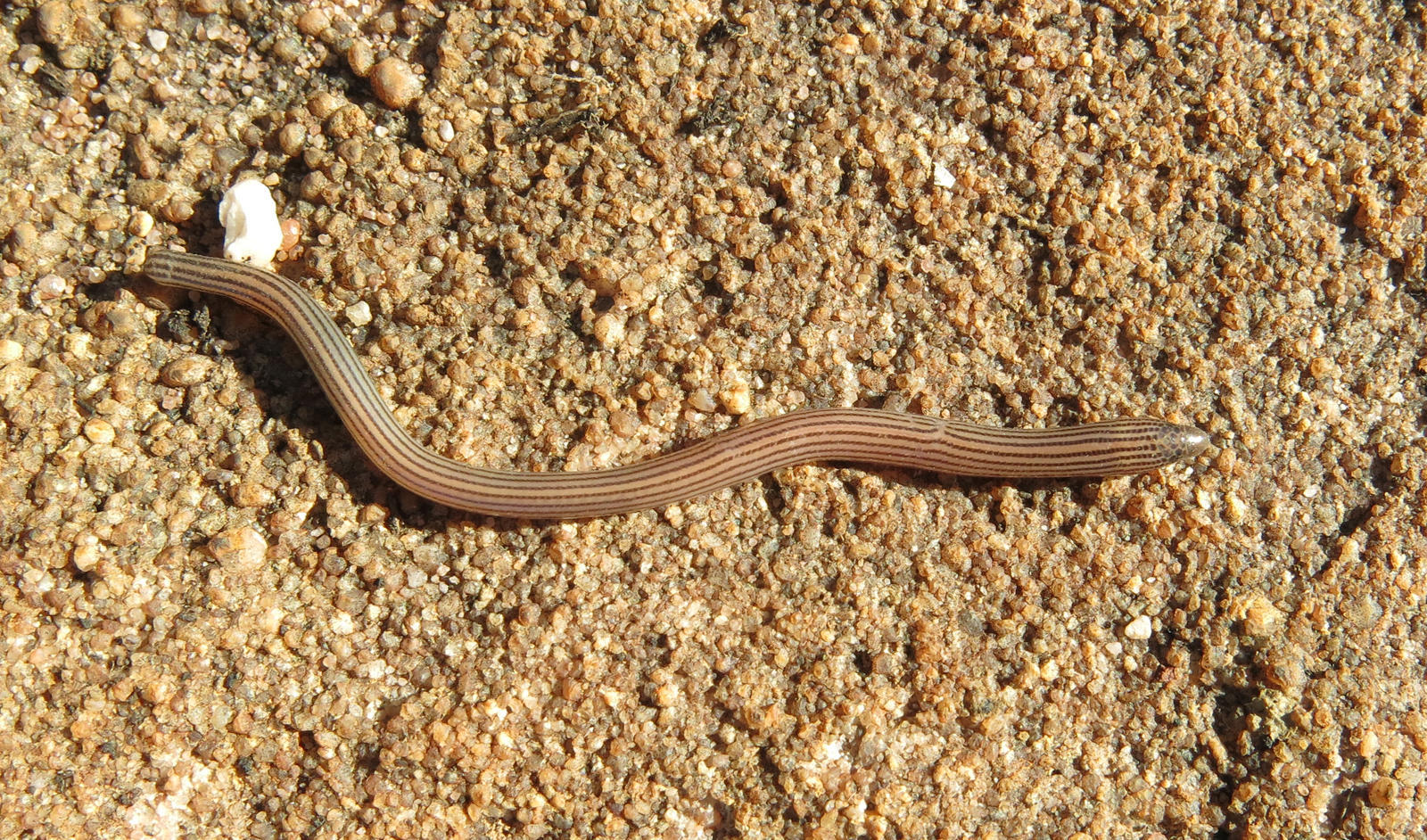

Conservation status
- Least Concern (IUCN 3.1)

Scientific classification
- Kingdom: Animalia
- Phylum: Chordata
- Class: Reptilia
- Order: Squamata
- Family: Scincidae
- Genus: Acontias
- Species: A. cregoi

Binomial name
- Acontias cregoi (Boulenger, 1903)

Synonyms
- Typhlosaurus cregoi Boulenger, 1903; Acontias cregoi — Lamb, Biswas & Bauer, 2010

= Acontias cregoi =

Species of lizard

Acontias cregoi, commonly known as Cregoe's legless skink, Cregoi's blind legless skink, and Cregoi's legless skink, is a species of lizard in the family Scincidae. The species is endemic to South Africa.

== Etymology ==
The specific name, cregoi, is in honor of John P. Cregoe who presented the holotype to the British Museum.

== Habitat ==
The preferred natural habitat of A. cregoi is grassland, at altitudes of 650–1,700 m (2,130–5,580 ft).

== Description ==
The holotype of A. cregoi has a total length of 15 cm (6 inches), which includes a tail 2.5 cm (1 inch) long.

== Reproduction ==
A. cregoi is viviparous.
