= Acontias parietalis =

Conservation status
- Least Concern (IUCN 3.1)

Scientific classification
- Kingdom: Animalia
- Phylum: Chordata
- Class: Reptilia
- Order: Squamata
- Family: Scincidae
- Genus: Acontias
- Species: A. parietalis

Binomial name
- Acontias parietalis (Broadley, 1990)

Species of lizard

Acontias parietalis, the Maputaland legless skink, is a species of lizard in the family Scincidae. It is found in Zimbabwe, Mozambique, and Botswana.
