= Acontias fitzsimonsi =

Conservation status
- Least Concern (IUCN 3.1)

Scientific classification
- Kingdom: Animalia
- Phylum: Chordata
- Class: Reptilia
- Order: Squamata
- Suborder: Scinciformata
- Infraorder: Scincomorpha
- Family: Acontidae
- Genus: Acontias
- Species: A. fitzsimonsi

Binomial name
- Acontias fitzsimonsi (Broadley, 1968)

Synonyms
- Typhlosaurus aurantiacus fitzsimonsi Broadley, 1968; Acontias aurantiacus fitzsimonsi — Lamb et al. 2010

Species of lizard

Acontias fitzsimonsi, Fitzsimons' legless skink or Fitzsimon's legless skink, is a species of lizard in the family Scincidae. It is endemic to South Africa.
