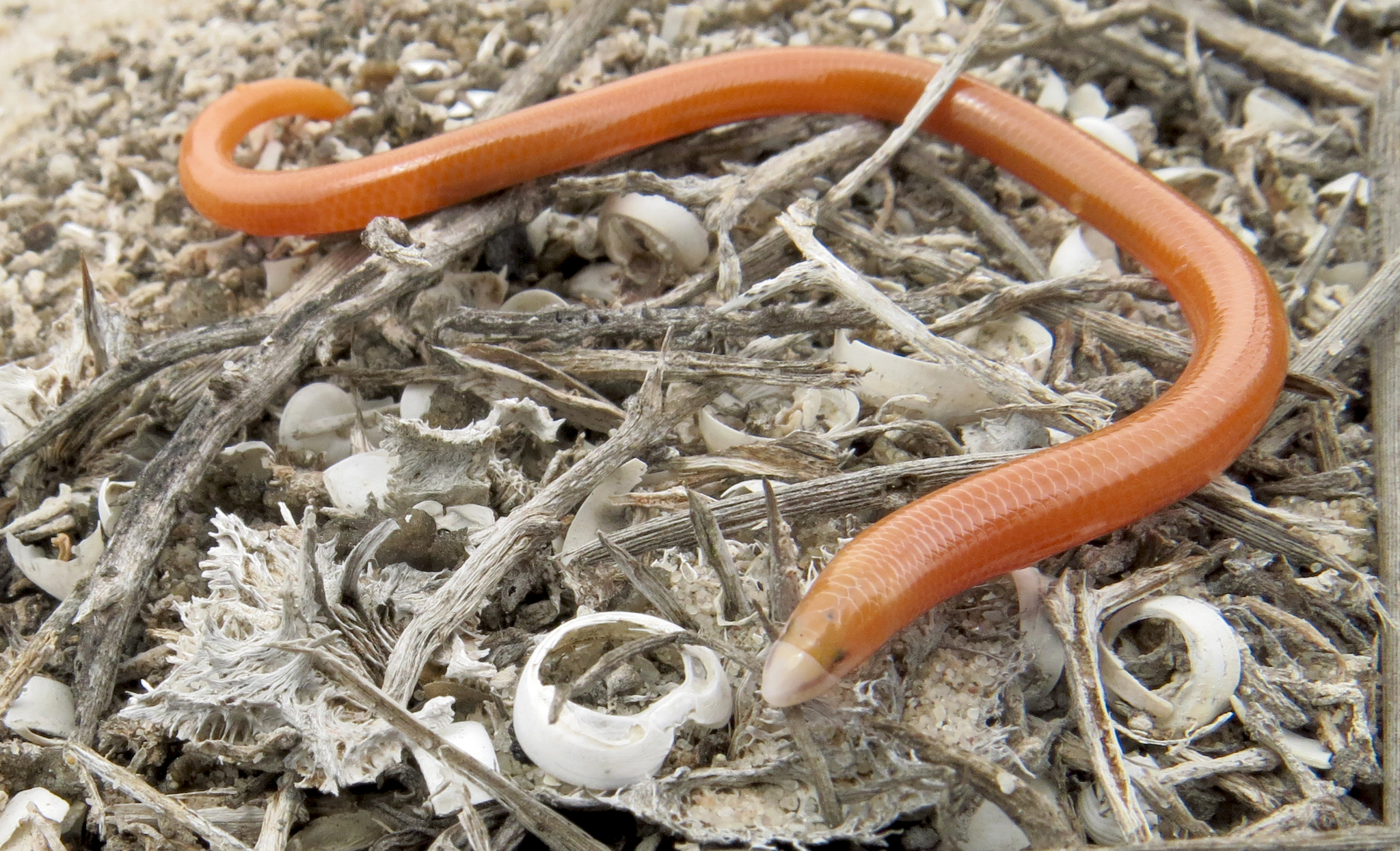

Conservation status
- Least Concern (IUCN 3.1)

Scientific classification
- Domain: Eukaryota
- Kingdom: Animalia
- Phylum: Chordata
- Class: Reptilia
- Order: Squamata
- Family: Scincidae
- Genus: Acontias
- Species: A. lineatus

Binomial name
- Acontias lineatus Peters, 1879
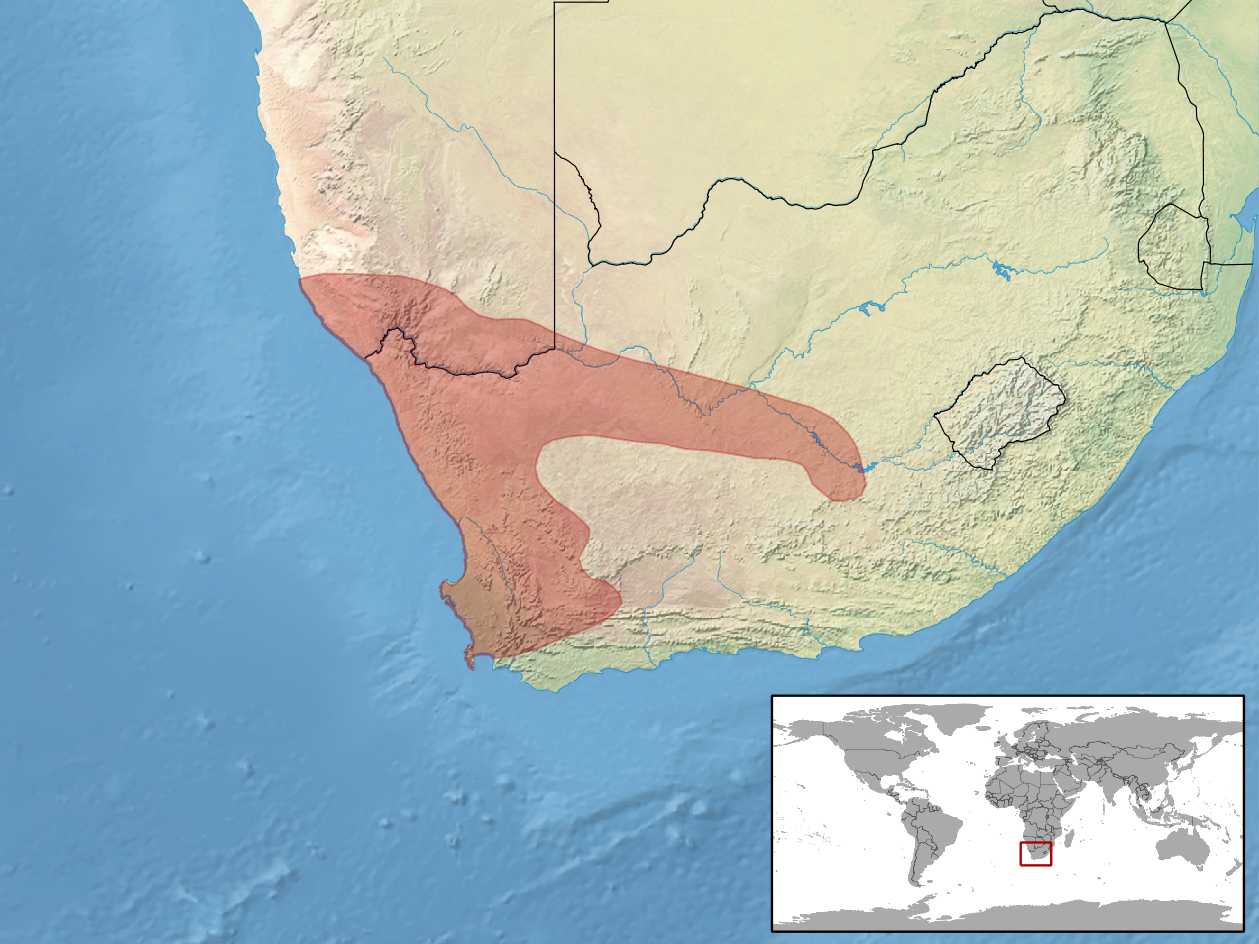

= Acontias lineatus =

Species of lizard

Acontias lineatus, known commonly as the striped dwarf legless skink or lined lance skink, is a species of lizard in the family Scincidae. It is found in South Africa and Namibia.
