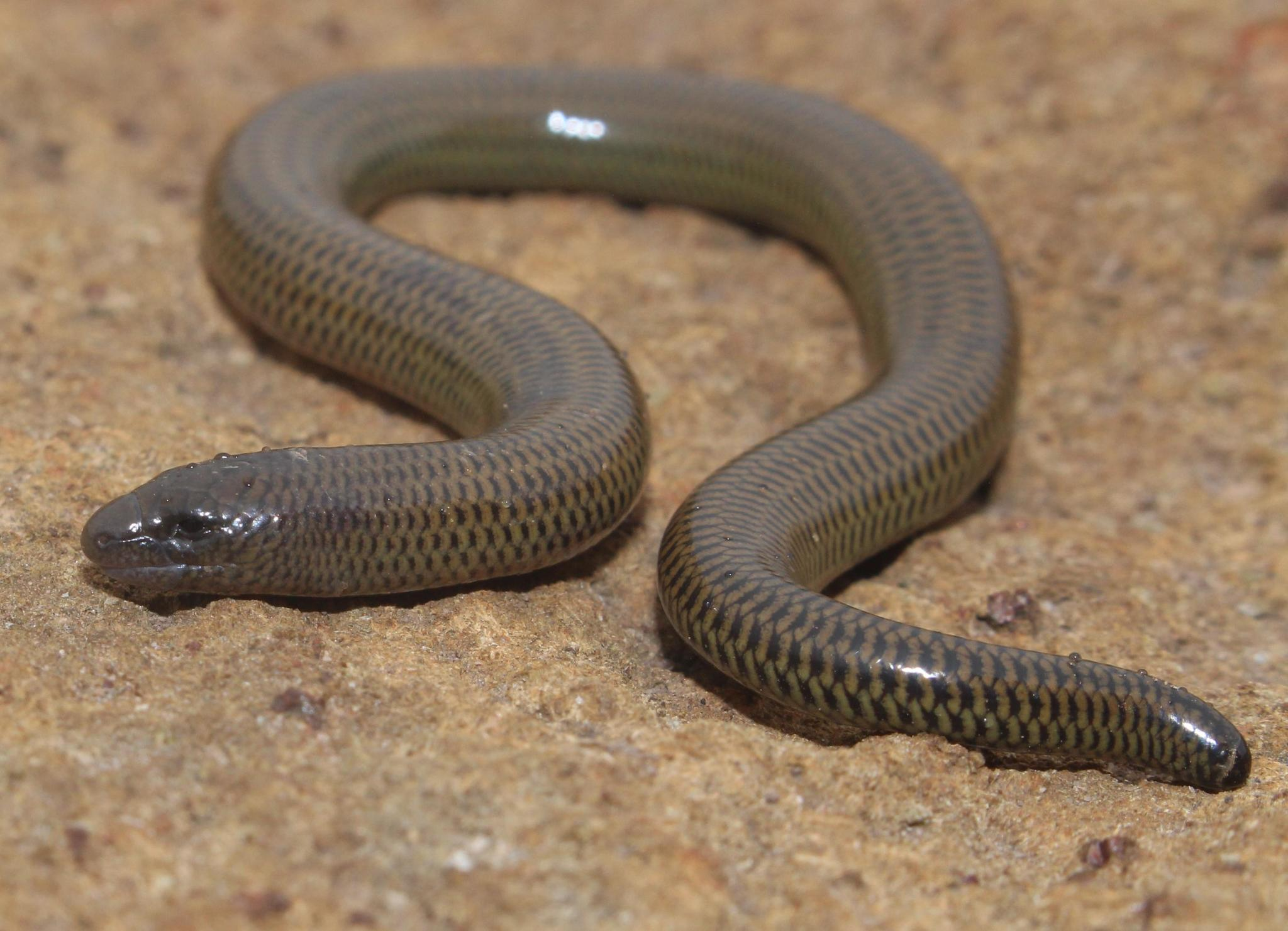

Conservation status
- Least Concern (IUCN 3.1)

Scientific classification
- Kingdom: Animalia
- Phylum: Chordata
- Class: Reptilia
- Order: Squamata
- Family: Scincidae
- Genus: Acontias
- Species: A. breviceps

Binomial name
- Acontias breviceps Essex, 1925
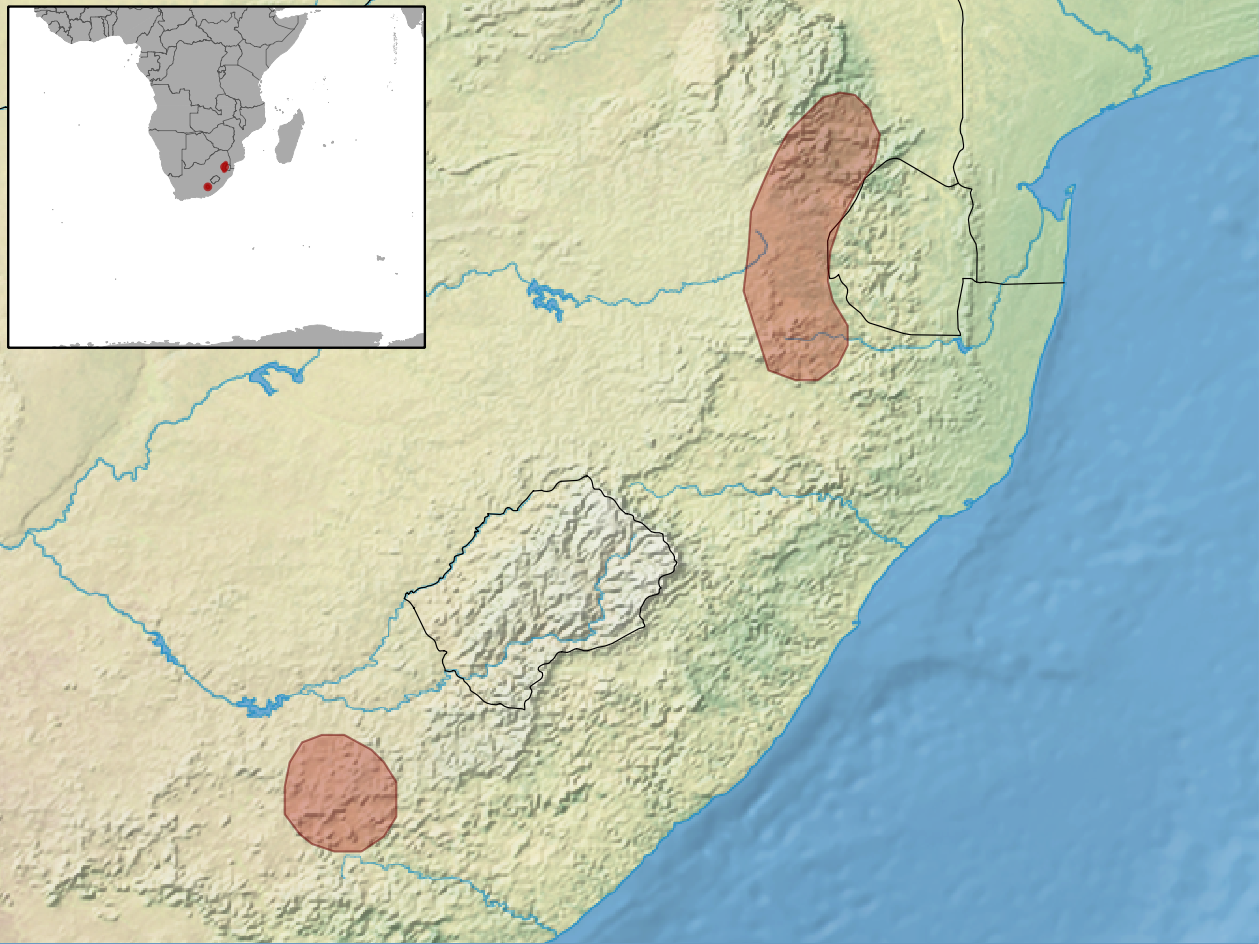

Synonyms
- Acontias plumbeus breviceps FitzSimons, 1943

= Acontias breviceps =

Shorthead lance skink

Species of lizard

Acontias breviceps, the shorthead lance skink or shortheaded legless skink, is a species of viviparous, legless, fossorial lizards occurring along the southern and eastern sections of the Great Escarpment in South Africa. It may grow up to 10 centimetres (3.9 in) long.

This skink was first collected in 1925 by Robert Essex at Hogsback in the Amatola Mountains in the Eastern Cape at an elevation of some 6,000 feet (1,800 m). A disjunct second population exist in the Transvaal Drakensberg. Essex collected for the Albany Museum of Grahamstown, but a fire in 1941 destroyed most specimens and records.

== Bibliography ==
- Daniels, Savel R.; Heideman, Neil J. L.; Hendricks, Martin G. J.; Crandall, Keith A. (2006). "Taxonomic subdivisions within the fossorial skink subfamily Acontinae (Squamata: Scincidae) reconsidered: a multilocus perspective". Zoologica Scripta. 35 (4): 353. ISSN 0300-3256.
- Essex, R. 1925. Descriptions of two new species of the genus Acontias and notes on some other lizards found in the Cape Province. Rec. Albany Mus. 3: 332–342.
- Greer, Allen E. 2001. Distribution of maximum snout-vent length among species of Scincid lizards. Journal of Herpetology 35 (3): 383–395
- Lamb, T.; Biswas, S. & Bauer, A.M. 2010. A phylogenetic reassessment of African fossorial skinks in the subfamily Acontinae (Squamata: Scincidae): evidence for parallelism and polyphyly. Zootaxa 2657: 33–46
