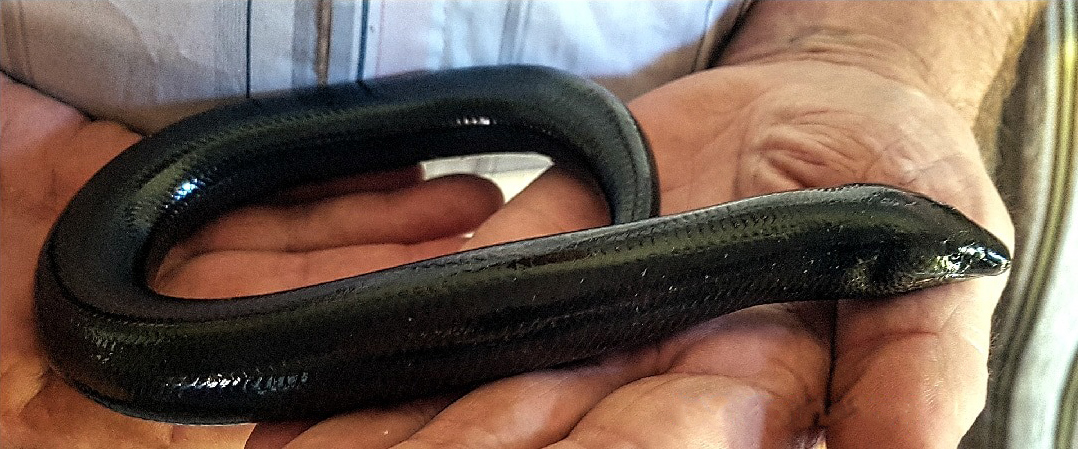

Conservation status
- Least Concern (IUCN 3.1)

Scientific classification
- Kingdom: Animalia
- Phylum: Chordata
- Class: Reptilia
- Order: Squamata
- Family: Scincidae
- Genus: Acontias
- Species: A. plumbeus

Binomial name
- Acontias plumbeus (Bianconi, 1849)
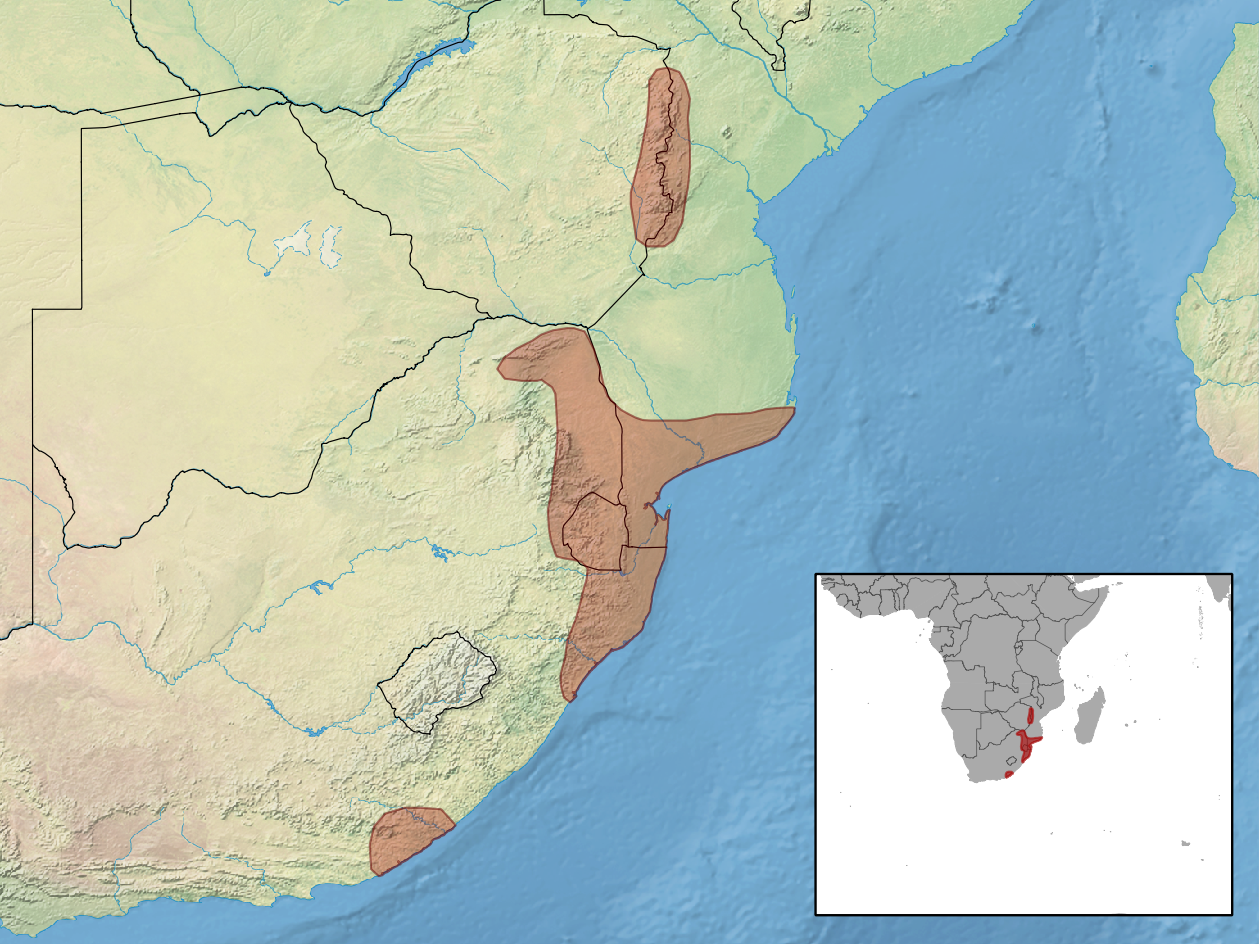

= Acontias plumbeus =

Species of lizard

Acontias plumbeus, the giant legless skink or giant lance skink, is a species of lizard in the family Scincidae. It is found in South Africa, Eswatini, Mozambique, and Zimbabwe.

Acontias plumbei live in seasonally dry savanna, woodland humus, and forest floor leaf litter throughout South Africa ranging from Eastern Cape to Zimbabwe.

It was previously believed that acontias plumbeus had no genetic variation and existed as a monotypic species, however the genetic structure analysis has revealed that acontias poecilus are morphological variations of acontias plumbeus. Its morphological variation now appends species of different colors including uniform light brown, dark brown, black, and intermediate gray.
