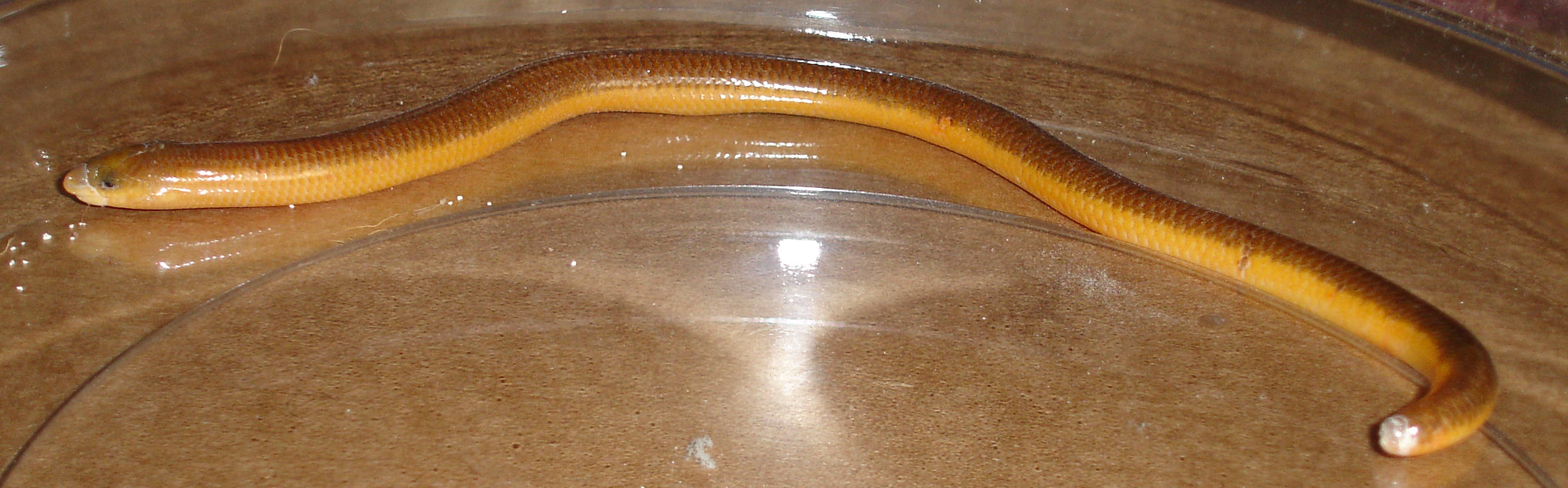
- Acontias percivali

Scientific classification
- Kingdom: Animalia
- Phylum: Chordata
- Order: Squamata
- Family: Scincidae
- Subfamily: Acontinae; Gray, 1839

= Acontinae =

Subfamily of skinks

Acontinae is a subfamily of limbless skinks within the family Scincidae.

== Genera ==
The subfamily Acontinae contains 2 genera.

- Acontias (26 species)
- Typhlosaurus (5 species)
