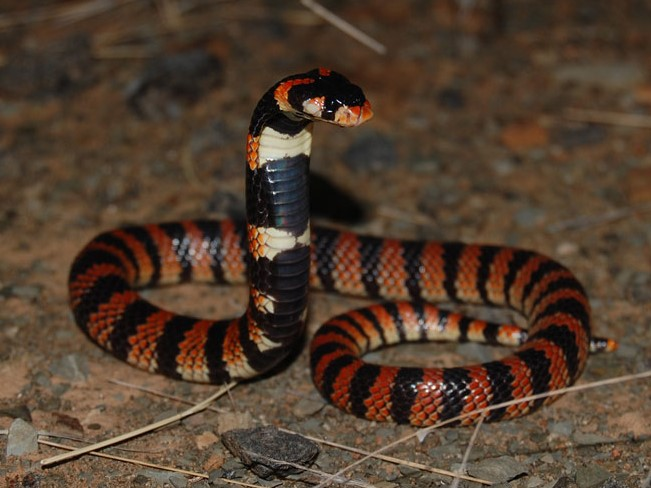

Conservation status
- Least Concern (IUCN 3.1)

Scientific classification
- Kingdom: Animalia
- Phylum: Chordata
- Class: Reptilia
- Order: Squamata
- Suborder: Serpentes
- Family: Elapidae
- Genus: Aspidelaps
- Species: A. lubricus

Binomial name
- Aspidelaps lubricus (Laurenti, 1768)
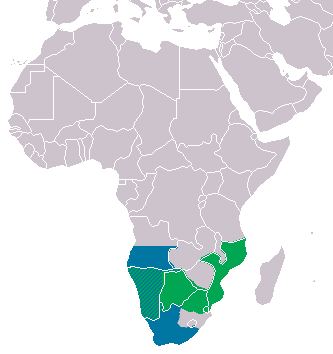
- range of A. lubricus range of A. scutatus

Synonyms
- List: Natrix lubrica Laurenti, 1768; Elaps lubricus — Merrem, 1820; Naia somersetta A. Smith, 1826; Naja lubrica — Schlegel, 1837; Aspidelaps lubricus — A. Smith, 1849

= Aspidelaps lubricus =

Species of snake

Aspidelaps lubricus, commonly known as the Cape coral snake, Cape coral cobra or coral shield cobra, is a species of venomous snake in the family Elapidae. The species is native to southern Africa.

== Geographic range and habitat ==
Aspidelaps lubricus is found in regions of the Karoo, former Cape Province, and northward into Namibia. It mostly inhabits very arid regions, like deserts and rocky/sandy ecosystems. These areas within South Africa within the Karoo are known for low predictable rainfall and little vegetation, mostly shrubs and scrubs.

== Taxonomy ==
Subspecies	Taxon author	Common name	Geographic range
A. l. lubricus	(Laurenti, 1768)	Cape coral snake	Cape Province, Orange Free State (South Africa)
A. l. cowlesi	Bogert, 1940	Angolan coral snake or Kunene coral snake	Southern Angola, northern Namibia

== Etymology ==
The subspecific name, cowlesi, is in honor of African-born American herpetologist Raymond Bridgman Cowles.

== Description ==
Aspidelaps lubricus is a relatively small, slender bodied snake, around 1.6–2.0 ft (49–61 cm) in total length (tail included), with some growing up to 2.5 ft (76 cm) in some cases. The Cape coral snake is a small elapid, which means that it is a part of a family of venomous snakes that are usually found within tropical or sub-tropical regions around the globe. It has an enlarged rostral scale, which is the scale located at the front of the snout above the mouth opening on the snake. The head relative to the body is very short, making it very easy to distinguish it from the neck and rest of the snake. Colors range from red-orange to yellow, slightly resembling the coloration patterns seen on some corn snakes. The Cape coral snake has thick black rings along the length of the body, fully encircling on the body while not fully on the tail segment. There are around 20–47 total rings spanning the length of the snakes body. This species also contains a narrow hood right below the head, much like other cobras.

== Behaviour ==
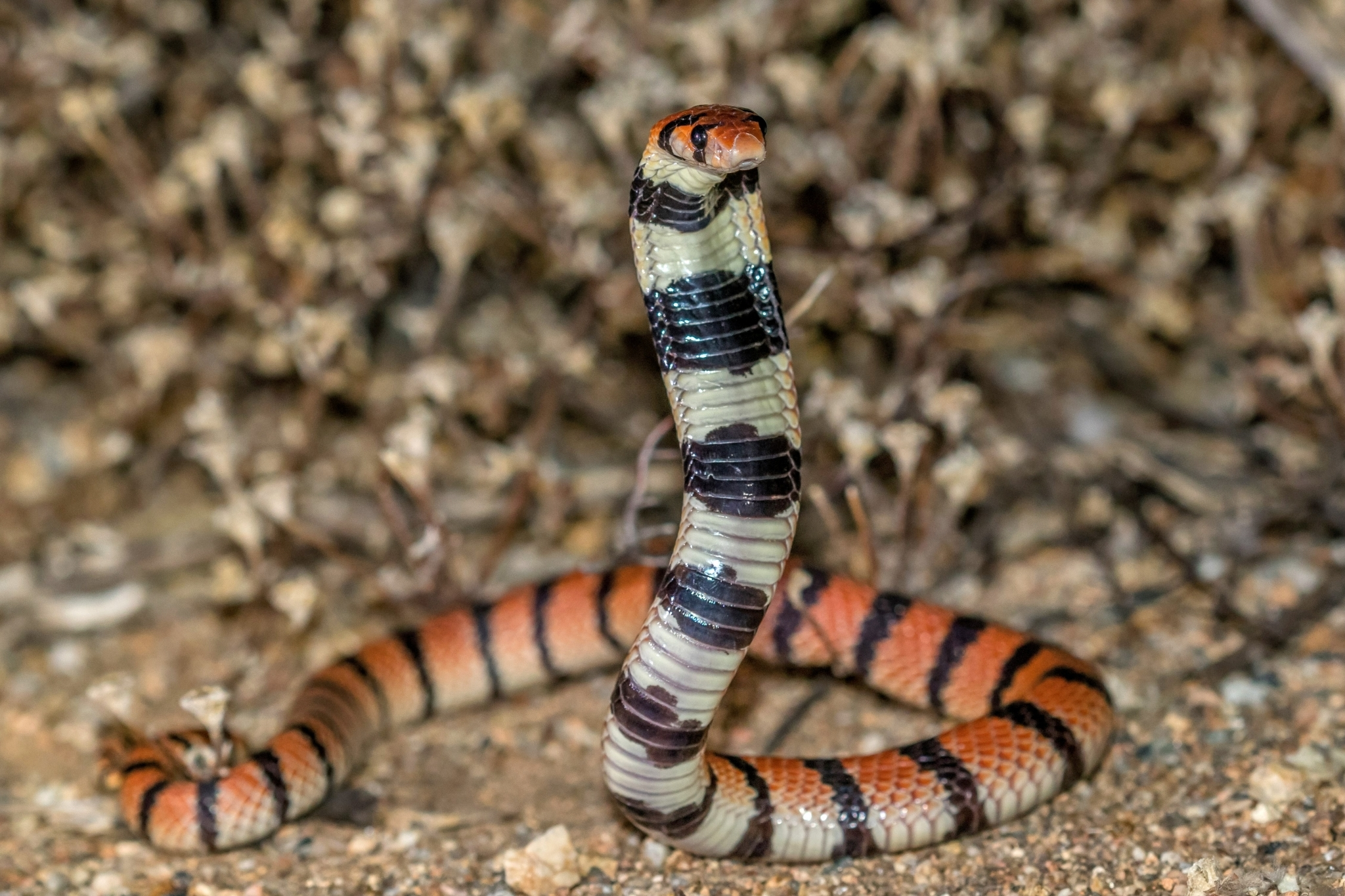
In South Africa

Aspidelaps lubricus is nocturnal, which means most of its activity and hunting occurs during the night. Since it generally prefers arid, rocky/sandy ecosystems, it will often be found living under rocks or even in burrows and tunnels. It has also been known to prefer leaving its burrow or hiding spots on cooler nights compared to the warmer nights in the summer.

== Diet ==
Since Aspidelaps lubricus is nocturnal, it relies on smell and taste to hunt its prey. It typically leaves its burrow or hole in search of smaller vertebrates nearby. It preys specifically on lizards, but has also been known to hunt other vertebrates such as legless skinks, small rodents, and sometimes other snakes. It is also known to target those vertebrates which are strictly diurnal, which are sleeping when it is on the hunt. This snake is known to rear up towards prey or when threatened, and then strike, injecting its venom. In captivity, it is known to eat some types of fish, mice, small rats, and also chicken legs, which are preferred by the juveniles.

== Reproduction and life cycles ==
Not much information has been found on Aspidelaps lubricus in the wild, however there is reproduction data from captivity. In captivity, it is known to be exceptionally easy to breed. The breeding period starts in the winter, with the cooling down of winter temperatures. The snakes then increase their uptake of food to help cope with the extra energy needed to reproduce. If mating occurs at this time, the eggs will usually be laid in May or June. After that, there is a period of about 65 days before the eggs begin to hatch. There are usually between 3 and 11 eggs hatched per clutch, with sometimes multiple clutches per breeding period. Each hatchling can be around 17–18 cm (6.7–7.1 inches) in total length.

== Venom ==
Although Aspidelaps lubricus has been kept in captivity, there is still little available information on the venom and its clinical effect. A study analyzing the venom suggests a composition similar to other elapids such as species of the genus Naja (known as true cobras). When venom has been taken in captivity, it yields around 27–71 mg of wet venom. The average yield is around 55 mg and is about 28% solid material. Previous studies have shown that in rats, this snake's venom caused neurological symptoms, which escalated into respiratory failure and eventually death.

Few reports concerning A. lubricus bites to humans are documented and report different effects ranging from no symptoms (possible bites without envenoming), mild symptoms to severe neurological signs and fatal outcome. The effect of the venom might depend on variations in intra-specific venom composition, amount of venom administered and patient body weight. In a case reported in 2019, a 44-year-old man was bitten twice by this species, which was being kept in captivity. One hour after the bite, he developed vomiting, respiratory failure (requiring mechanical ventilation), paralysis of the bulbar muscles and upper limbs, with retention of the voluntary motor control in the lower limbs. After treatment, paralysis and respiratory failure resolved in 12 hours. No antivenom or established clinical management protocol is currently available for this species, and timely access to assisted ventilation is limited in many regions in southern Africa.

== Conservation status ==
As of 2015, the Cape coral snake is not listed as threatened or in need of conservation efforts. The main threat that is listed for this species is when crossing roads and highways, where vehicles can run over them.
