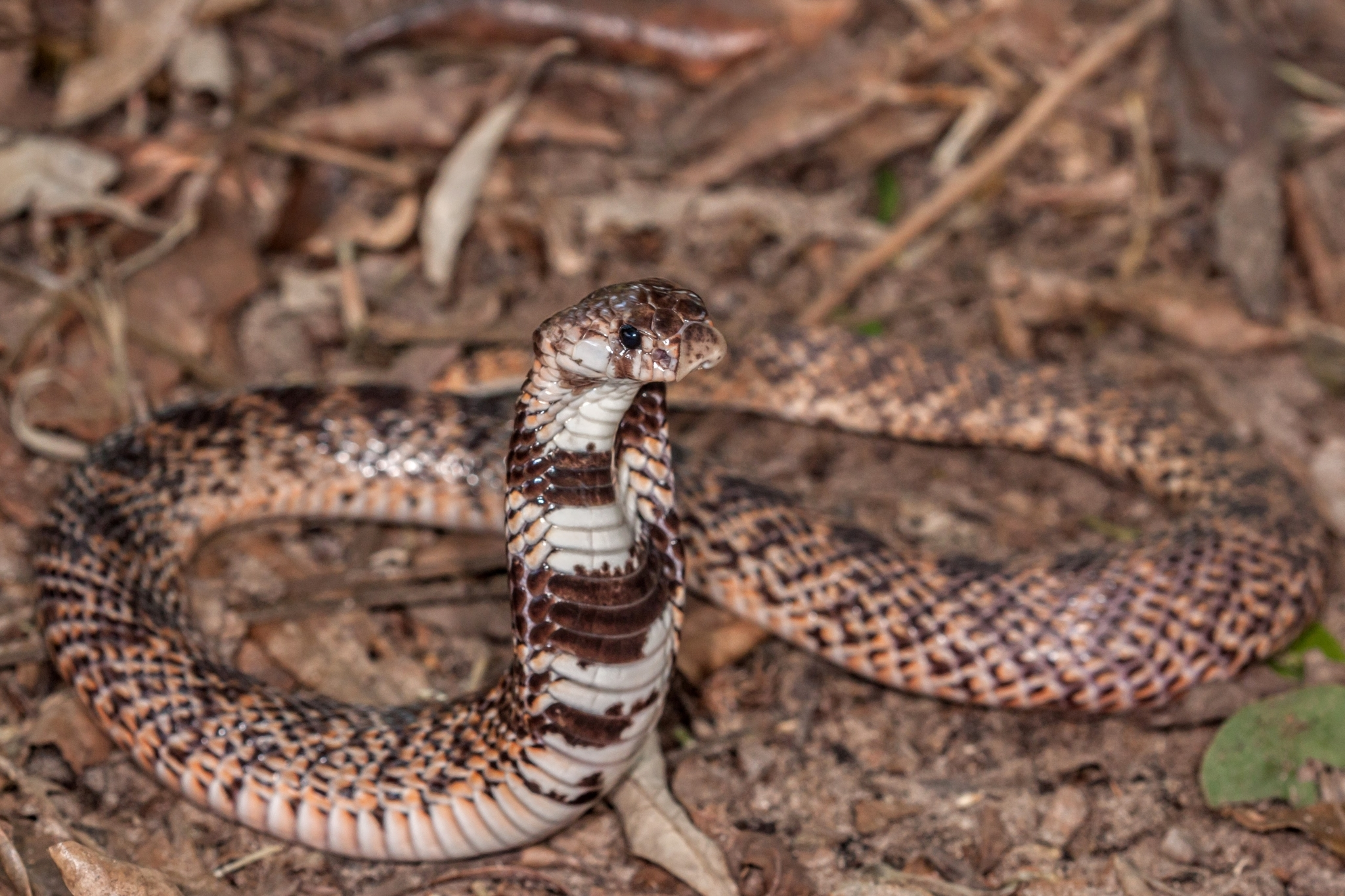
- A. scutatus, the shield-nosed cobra

Scientific classification
- Kingdom: Animalia
- Phylum: Chordata
- Class: Reptilia
- Order: Squamata
- Suborder: Serpentes
- Family: Elapidae
- Genus: Aspidelaps; Fitzinger, 1843
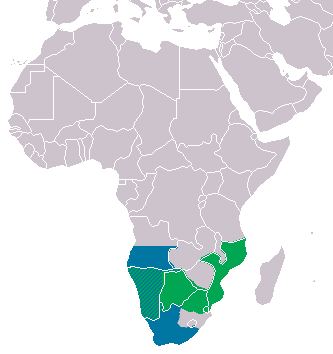
- range of A. lubricus range of A. scutatus

= Aspidelaps =

Genus of snakes

Aspidelaps is a genus of venomous elapid snakes endemic to Africa. Species in the genus Aspidelaps are commonly called shield-nosed cobras, African coral snakes or coral cobras after their cobra hoods and enlarged rostral (nose) scales. However, the hood is not nearly as well developed in Aspidelaps as it is in the true cobras of the genus Naja.

== Species ==
Image	Species	Subsp.*	Common name	Distribution
	A. lubricus (Laurenti, 1768)	2	Cape coral snake	South Africa (Cape Province), southern Angola, Namibia
	A. scutatus (A. Smith, 1849)	3	shield-nosed cobra	Namibia, Botswana, Zimbabwe, north-east South Africa, Mozambique

== Venom ==
Aspidelaps venom is neurotoxic, and Aspidelaps bites have caused human deaths in a few cases.
