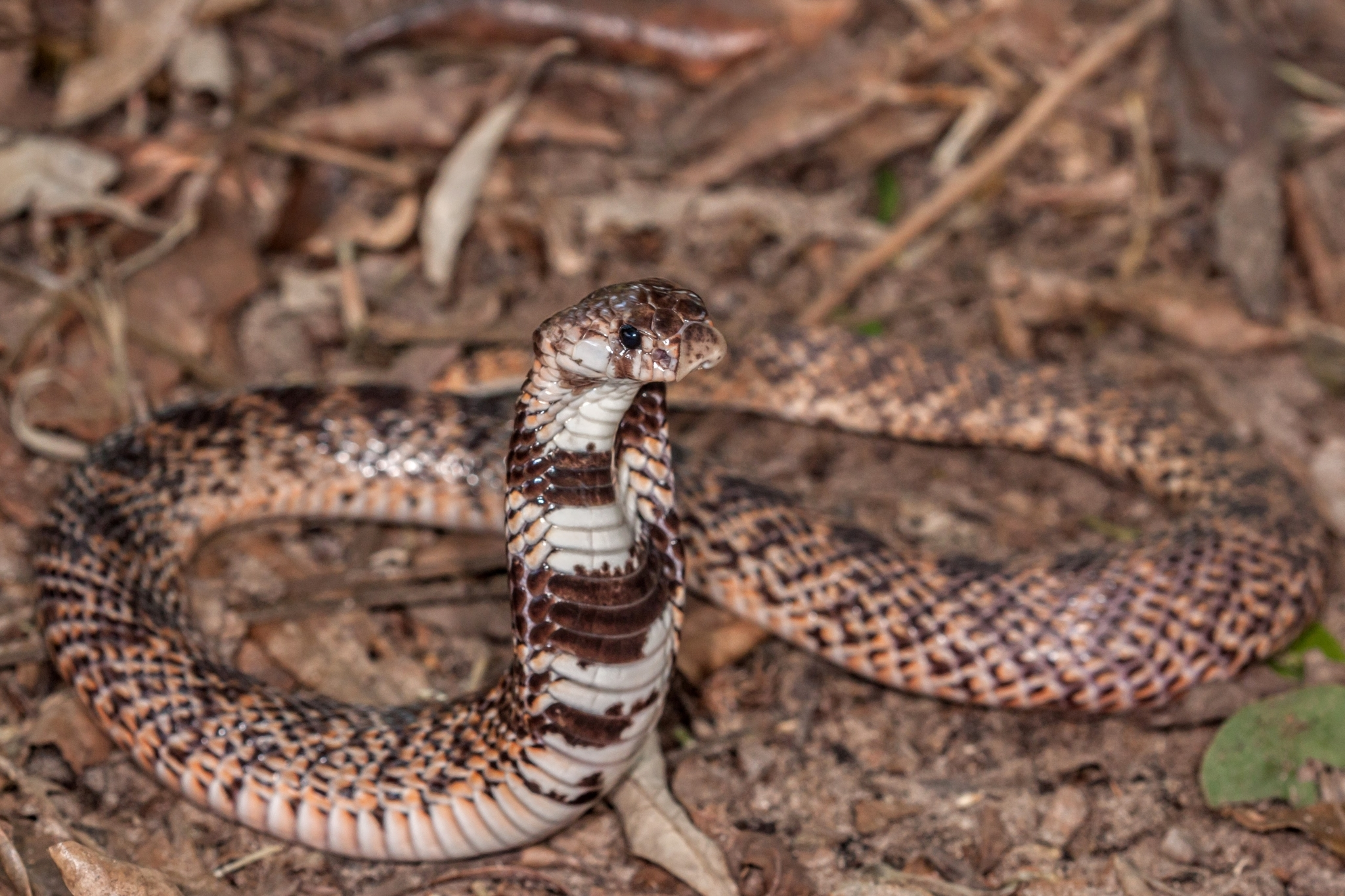

Conservation status
- Least Concern (IUCN 3.1)

Scientific classification
- Kingdom: Animalia
- Phylum: Chordata
- Class: Reptilia
- Order: Squamata
- Suborder: Serpentes
- Family: Elapidae
- Genus: Aspidelaps
- Species: A. scutatus

Binomial name
- Aspidelaps scutatus (Smith, 1849)
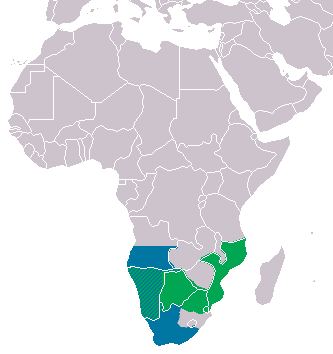
- range of A. lubricus range of A. scutatus

Synonyms
- Cyrtophis scutatus A. Smith, 1849

= Shield-nosed cobra =

Species of snake

The shield-nosed cobra (Aspidelaps scutatus), also known commonly as the eastern shield-nose snake, is a species of venomous snake of the family Elapidae. The species is native to southern Africa. There are three recognized subspecies.

== Description ==
Adults of Aspidelaps scutatus have an average snout-to-vent length (SVL) of 63.5 cm (25.0 in). The dorsal scales are arranged in 21–25 rows at midbody, and they are keeled on the posterior portion of the body.

== Geographic range ==
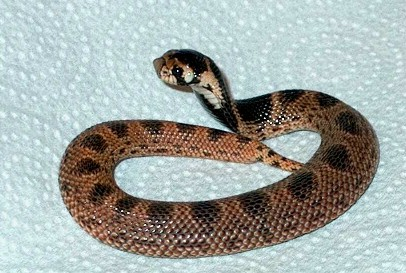
Juvenile

The shield-nosed cobra is found in Botswana, Eswatini, Lesotho, Malawi, Mozambique, Namibia, South Africa, Zambia and Zimbabwe.

== Habitat ==
The preferred natural habitat of Aspidelaps scutatus is sandy-soiled savanna, at altitudes of 90–1,400 m (300–4,590 ft).

== In captivity ==
Aspidelaps scutatus can survive between 20 and 28 years in captivity, though this age is normally not attained in the wild due to predation, accidents, etc.

== Venom ==
The species Aspidelaps scutatus is highly venomous, and its bite has caused at least one reported death of a human, despite its propensity to bite being somewhat low. The venom is highly neurotoxic. Symptoms include slurred speech, ptosis, and partial paralysis. No antivenin is available for this species. Any bite or spit-sprayed venom from any elapid snake should be treated as an urgent medical emergency.

== Behavior ==
Aspidelaps scutatus is fossorial. A specialized skull structure, along with the uniquely large rostral scale, make it very effective at digging and tunneling. It is a nocturnal species.

== Diet ==
Aspidelaps scutatus preys upon suitably sized amphibians, lizards, snakes, and mammals.

== Reproduction ==
Aspidelaps scutatus is oviparous. Clutch size is 4–10 eggs, and the female may stay with her eggs, coiled around them.

== Subspecies ==
Three subspecies are recognized as being valid, including the nominotypical subspecies.

- Aspidelaps scutatus fulafulus (Bianconi, 1849)
- Aspidelaps scutatus intermedius Broadley, 1968
- Aspidelaps scutatus scutatus (A. Smith, 1849)

Nota bene: A trinomial authority in parentheses indicates that the subspecies was originally described in a genus other than Aspidelaps.
