= List of reptiles of the Democratic Republic of the Congo =

This is a list of reptiles of the Democratic Republic of the Congo by family and order. It lists all families and species of reptiles in the Democratic Republic of the Congo.

The list below follows Donald George Broadley's 1998 "The reptilian fauna of the Democratic Republic of the Congo (Congo-Kinshasa)", and the Reptile Database.

There are 336 species of reptiles (class Reptilia), in 109 genera, in 22 families, in 5 orders, in the Democratic Republic of the Congo. Some are presumed to occur in the DRC, because they have been found in neighboring areas, but have not yet been found in DRC (see comment after name).

== Order Amphisbaenia - amphisbaenids ==
10 species in 4 genera in 1 family

- Family Amphisbaenidae – amphisbaenid or legless lizards, 10 species in 4 genera:
  - Dalophia gigantea (Peracca, 1903)
  - Dalophia luluae (De Witte & Laurent, 1942)
  - Monopeltis adercae De Witte, 1953
  - Monopeltis guentheri Boulenger, 1885
  - Monopeltis kabindae De Witte & Laurent, 1942
  - Monopeltis remaclei De Witte, 1933
  - Monopeltis scalper (Günther, 1876)
  - Monopeltis schoutedeni De Witte, 1933
  - Monopeltis vanderysti De Witte, 1922
  - Zygaspis quadrifrons (Peters, 1862)

== Order Crocodylia - crocodiles ==
3 species in 3 genera in 1 family

- Family Crocodylidae – true crocodiles, 3 species in 3 genera:
  - Crocodylus niloticus Laurenti, 1768
  - Mecistops cataphractus (Cuvier, 1825)
  - Osteolaemus tetraspis Cope, 1861

== Order Sauria - lizards ==
120 species in 35 genera in 8 families

- Family Agamidae – 4 species in 2 genera:
  - Acanthocercus atricollis (Smith, 1849)
  - Agama agama (Linnaeus, 1758)
  - Agama anchietae Bocage, 1896
  - Agama armata Peters, 1855
- Family Chamaeleonidae – 20 species in 4 genera:
  - Chamaeleo anchietae Bocage, 1872
  - Chamaeleo dilepis Leach, 1819
  - Chamaeleo gracilis Hallowell, 1844
  - Chamaeleo laevigatus (Gray, 1863)
  - Chamaeleo quilensis Bocage, 1866
  - Chamaeleo roperi (Boulenger, 1890)
  - Kinyongia adolfifriderici (Sternfeld, 1912)
  - Kinyongia carpenteri (Parker, 1929)
  - Kinyongia xenorhina (Boulenger, 1901)
  - Rhampholeon boulengeri Steindachner, 1911
  - Rhampholeon spectrum (Buchholz, 1874) possibly in (W) DRC
  - Trioceros bitaeniatus (Fischer, 1884)
  - Trioceros chapini (De Witte, 1964)
  - Trioceros cristatus (Stutchbury, 1837) possibly in (W) DRC
  - Trioceros ellioti (Günther, 1895)
  - Trioceros ituriensis (Schmidt, 1919)
  - Trioceros johnstoni (Boulenger, 1901)
  - Trioceros oweni (Gray, 1831)
  - Trioceros rudis (Boulenger, 1906)
  - Trioceros schoutedeni (Laurent, 1952)
- Family Cordylidae – 4 species in 2 genera:
  - Chamaesaura anguina (Linnaeus, 1758)
  - Chamaesaura macrolepis (Cope, 1862)
  - Cordylus angolensis (Bocage, 1895) possibly in (S) DRC
  - Cordylus tropidosternum (Cope, 1869)
- Family Gekkonidae – 21 species in 5 genera:
  - Cnemaspis dickersonae (Schmidt, 1919)
  - Cnemaspis quattuorseriata (Sternfeld, 1912)
  - Elasmodactylus tuberculosus Boulenger, 1895
  - Hemidactylus brookii Gray, 1845
  - Hemidactylus echinus O'Shaughnessy, 1875
  - Hemidactylus fasciatus Gray, 1842
  - Hemidactylus longicephalus Bocage, 1873
  - Hemidactylus mabouia (Moreau De Jonnès, 1818)
  - Hemidactylus muriceus Peters, 1870
  - Hemidactylus pseudomuriceus Henle & Böhme, 2003 possibly in (W) DRC
  - Hemidactylus richardsonii (Gray, 1845)
  - Lygodactylus angolensis Bocage, 1896
  - Lygodactylus angularis Günther, 1893
  - Lygodactylus capensis (Smith, 1849)
  - Lygodactylus depressus Schmidt, 1919
  - Lygodactylus fischeri Boulenger, 1890 possibly, but not reported, in (W) DRC
  - Lygodactylus gutturalis (Bocage, 1873)
  - Lygodactylus picturatus (Peters, 1871)
  - Pachydactylus capensis (Smith, 1846)
  - Pachydactylus katanganus De Witte, 1953
  - Pachydactylus punctatus Peters, 1854
- Family Gerrhosauridae – 5 species in 2 genera:
  - Gerrhosaurus bulsi Laurent, 1954
  - Gerrhosaurus major Duméril, 1851
  - Gerrhosaurus multilineatus Bocage, 1866
  - Gerrhosaurus nigrolineatus Hallowell, 1857
  - Tetradactylus ellenbergeri (Angel, 1922)
- Family Lacertidae – 13 species in 7 genera:
  - Adolfus africanus (Boulenger, 1906)
  - Adolfus jacksoni (Boulenger, 1899)
  - Adolfus vauereselli (Tornier, 1902)
  - Gastropholis echinata (Cope, 1862)
  - Gastropholis tropidopholis (Boulenger, 1916)
  - Heliobolus nitidus (Günther, 1872)
  - Holaspis guentheri Gray, 1863
  - Holaspis laevis Werner, 1895
  - Ichnotropis bivittata Bocage, 1866
  - Ichnotropis capensis (Smith, 1838)
  - Ichnotropis chapini Schmidt, 1919
  - Latastia johnstonii Boulenger, 1907
  - Poromera fordii (Hallowell, 1857)
- Family Scincidae – 49 species in 12 genera:
  - Afroablepharus seydeli (De Witte, 1933)
  - Eumecia anchietae Bocage, 1870
  - Feylinia currori Gray, 1845
  - Feylinia elegans (Hallowell, 1852) probably in DRC
  - Feylinia macrolepis Boettger, 1887 possibly in (N, W) DRC
  - Lacertaspis reichenowii (Peters, 1874)
  - Lacertaspis rohdei (Müller, 1910) possibly in (W) DRC
  - Lepidothyris fernandi (Burton, 1836) possibly in (S) DRC
  - Lepidothyris hinkeli Wagner, Böhme, Pauwels & Schmitz, 2009
  - Lepidothyris striatus (Hallowell, 1854) possibly in (W) DRC
  - Leptosiaphos aloysiisabaudiae (Peracca, 1907)
  - Leptosiaphos blochmanni (Tornier, 1903)
  - Leptosiaphos dewittei (Loveridge, 1934)
  - Leptosiaphos graueri (Sternfeld, 1912)
  - Leptosiaphos hackarsi (De Witte, 1941)
  - Leptosiaphos hylophilus Laurent, 1982
  - Leptosiaphos luberoensis (De Witte, 1933)
  - Leptosiaphos meleagris (Boulenger, 1907)
  - Leptosiaphos rhodurus Laurent, 1952
  - Lygosoma guineensis (Peters, 1879) probably in DRC
  - Lygosoma sundevalli (Smith, 1849)
  - Melanoseps ater (Günther, 1873)
  - Melanoseps occidentalis (Peters, 1877)
  - Mochlus afer (Peters, 1854)
  - Panaspis breviceps (Peters, 1873)
  - Panaspis burgeoni (De Witte, 1933)
  - Panaspis cabindae (Bocage, 1866)
  - Panaspis helleri (Loveridge, 1932)
  - Panaspis kitsoni (Boulenger, 1913)
  - Panaspis quattuordigitata (Sternfeld, 1912)
  - Panaspis tancredii (Boulenger, 1909)
  - Panaspis wahlbergii (Smith, 1849)
  - Sepsina angolensis Bocage, 1866
  - Sepsina bayoni (Bocage, 1866)
  - Sepsina tetradactyla Peters, 1874
  - Trachylepis acutilabris (Peters, 1862)
  - Trachylepis affinis (Gray, 1838) possibly in (W) DRC
  - Trachylepis albilabris (Hallowell, 1857)
  - Trachylepis buettneri (Matschie, 1893)
  - Trachylepis ivensii (Bocage, 1879)
  - Trachylepis maculilabris (Gray, 1845)
  - Trachylepis megalura (Peters, 1878)
  - Trachylepis perrotetii (Duméril & Bibron, 1839)
  - Trachylepis planifrons (Peters, 1878)
  - Trachylepis polytropis (Boulenger, 1903)
  - Trachylepis pulcherrima De Witte, 1953
  - Trachylepis quinquetaeniata (Lichtenstein, 1823)
  - Trachylepis striata (Peters, 1844)
  - Trachylepis varia (Peters, 1867)
- Family Varanidae – 4 species in 1 genus:
  - Varanus albigularis (Daudin, 1802)
  - Varanus exanthematicus (Bosc, 1792)
  - Varanus niloticus (Linnaeus, 1758)
  - Varanus ornatus (Daudin, 1803)

== Order Serpentes – snakes ==
182 species in 59 genera in 8 families

- Family Atractaspididae – 28 species in 7 genera:
  - Amblyodipsas katangensis De Witte & Laurent, 1942
  - Amblyodipsas polylepis (Bocage, 1873)
  - Amblyodipsas rodhaini (De Witte, 1930)
  - Amblyodipsas unicolor (Reinhardt, 1843)
  - Aparallactus capensis Smith, 1849
  - Aparallactus lunulatus (Peters, 1854)
  - Aparallactus modestus (Günther, 1859)
  - Aparallactus moeruensis De Witte & Laurent, 1943
  - Atractaspis aterrima Günther, 1863
  - Atractaspis battersbyi De Witte, 1959
  - Atractaspis bibronii Smith, 1849
  - Atractaspis boulengeri Mocquard, 1897
  - Atractaspis congica Peters, 1877
  - Atractaspis corpulenta (Hallowell, 1854)
  - Atractaspis irregularis (Reinhardt, 1843)
  - Atractaspis reticulata Sjöstedt, 1896
  - Chilorhinophis gerardi (Boulenger, 1913)
  - Hypoptophis wilsoni Boulenger, 1908
  - Polemon bocourti Mocquard, 1897
  - Polemon christyi (Boulenger, 1903)
  - Polemon collaris (Peters, 1881)
  - Polemon fulvicollis (Mocquard, 1887)
  - Polemon gabonensis (Duméril, 1856)
  - Polemon notatus (Peters, 1882)
  - Polemon robustus De Witte & Laurent, 1947
  - Xenocalamus bicolor Günther, 1868
  - Xenocalamus mechowii Peters, 1881
  - Xenocalamus michelli Müller, 1911
- Family Boidae – 3 species in 2 genera:
  - Calabaria reinhardtii (Schlegel, 1848)
  - Python regius (Shaw, 1802)
  - Python sebae (Gmelin, 1789)
- Family Colubridae – 98 species in 36 genera:
  - Bothrolycus ater Günther, 1874
  - Bothrophthalmus brunneus Günther, 1863 possibly in (W) DRC
  - Bothrophthalmus lineatus (Peters, 1863)
  - Buhoma depressiceps (Werner, 1897)
  - Chamaelycus christyi Boulenger, 1919
  - Chamaelycus fasciatus (Günther, 1858)
  - Chamaelycus parkeri (Angel, 1934)
  - Chamaelycus werneri (Mocquard, 1902) possibly in (W) DRC
  - Crotaphopeltis hotamboeia (Laurenti, 1768)
  - Dasypeltis atra Sternfeld, 1912
  - Dasypeltis fasciata Smith, 1849
  - Dasypeltis scabra (Linnaeus, 1758)
  - Dendrolycus elapoides (Günther, 1874)
  - Dipsadoboa duchesnii (Boulenger, 1901)
  - Dipsadoboa shrevei (Loveridge, 1932)
  - Dipsadoboa unicolor Günther, 1858
  - Dipsadoboa viridis (Peters, 1869)
  - Dipsadoboa weileri (Lindholm, 1905)
  - Dispholidus typus (Smith, 1828)
  - Duberria lutrix (Linnaeus, 1758)
  - Duberria shirana (Boulenger, 1894)
  - Gonionotophis brussauxi (Mocquard, 1889)
  - Grayia caesar (Günther, 1863)
  - Grayia ornata Bocage, 1866
  - Grayia smithii (Leach, 1818)
  - Grayia tholloni Mocquard, 1897
  - Hapsidophrys lineatus Fischer, 1856
  - Hapsidophrys smaragdina (Schlegel, 1837)
  - Helophis schoutedeni (De Witte, 1942)
  - Hemirhagerrhis nototaenia (Günther, 1864)
  - Hormonotus modestus (Duméril, Bibron & Duméril, 1854)
  - Hydraethiops melanogaster Günther, 1872
  - Lamprophis fuliginosus (Boie, 1827)
  - Lamprophis lineatus (Duméril, Bibron & Duméril, 1854)
  - Lamprophis olivaceus (Duméril, 1856)
  - Lamprophis virgatus (Hallowell, 1854)
  - Limnophis bangweolicus Mertens, 1936
  - Limnophis bicolor Günther, 1865
  - Lycodonomorphus bicolor (Günther, 1893)
  - Lycodonomorphus leleupi (Laurent, 1950)
  - Lycodonomorphus subtaeniatus Laurent, 1954
  - Lycophidion capense (Smith, 1831)
  - Lycophidion hellmichi Laurent, 1964
  - Lycophidion irroratum (Leach, 1819)
  - Lycophidion laterale Hallowell, 1857
  - Lycophidion meleagris (Boulenger, 1893)
  - Lycophidion multimaculatum (Boettger, 1888)
  - Lycophidion ornatum Parker, 1936
  - Mehelya capensis (Smith, 1847)
  - Mehelya guirali (Mocquard, 1887)
  - Mehelya laurenti De Witte, 1959
  - Mehelya nyassae (Günther, 1888)
  - Mehelya poensis (Smith, 1849)
  - Mehelya stenophthalmus (Mocquard, 1887)
  - Meizodon coronatus (Schlegel, 1837)
  - Meizodon regularis Fischer, 1856
  - Natriciteres bipostocularis Broadley, 1962
  - Natriciteres fuliginoides (Günther, 1858)
  - Natriciteres olivacea (Peters, 1854)
  - Natriciteres variegata (Peters, 1861)
  - Philothamnus angolensis Bocage, 1882
  - Philothamnus bequaerti (Schmidt, 1923)
  - Philothamnus carinatus (Andersson, 1901)
  - Philothamnus dorsalis (Bocage, 1866)
  - Philothamnus heterodermus (Hallowell, 1857)
  - Philothamnus heterolepidotus (Günther, 1863)
  - Philothamnus hoplogaster (Günther, 1863)
  - Philothamnus hughesi Trape & Roux-Estève, 1990
  - Philothamnus irregularis Leach, 1819
  - Philothamnus nitidus (Günther, 1863)
  - Philothamnus ornatus Bocage, 1872
  - Philothamnus semivariegatus (Smith, 1840)
  - Prosymna ambigua Bocage, 1873
  - Prosymna meleagris (Reinhardt, 1843)
  - Psammophis angolensis (Bocage, 1872)
  - Psammophis jallae Peracca, 1896
  - Psammophis lineatus (Duméril, Bibron & Duméril, 1854)
  - Psammophis mossambicus Peters, 1882
  - Psammophis phillipsii (Hallowell, 1844)
  - Psammophis sibilans (Linnaeus, 1758)
  - Psammophis subtaeniatus Peters, 1881
  - Psammophis zambiensis Hughes, 2002
  - Psammophylax acutus (Günther, 1888)
  - Psammophylax tritaeniatus (Günther, 1868)
  - Psammophylax variabilis Günther, 1893
  - Pseudaspis cana (Linnaeus, 1758)
  - Rhamnophis aethiopissa Günther, 1862
  - Rhamnophis batesii (Boulenger, 1908)
  - Rhamphiophis oxyrhynchus (Reinhardt, 1843)
  - Rhamphiophis rostratus Peters, 1854
  - Scaphiophis albopunctatus Peters, 1870
  - Telescopus semiannulatus Smith, 1849
  - Thelotornis capensis Smith, 1849
  - Thelotornis kirtlandii (Hallowell, 1844)
  - Thrasops flavigularis (Hallowell, 1852)
  - Thrasops jacksonii Günther, 1895
  - Toxicodryas blandingii (Hallowell, 1844)
  - Toxicodryas pulverulenta (Fischer, 1856)
- Family Elapidae – 15 species in 4 genera:
  - Dendroaspis angusticeps (Smith, 1849)
  - Dendroaspis jamesoni (Traill, 1843)
  - Dendroaspis polylepis Günther, 1864
  - Elapsoidea guentherii Bocage, 1866
  - Elapsoidea laticincta (Werner, 1919)
  - Elapsoidea loveridgei Parker, 1949
  - Elapsoidea semiannulata Bocage, 1882
  - Naja annulata (Peters, 1876)
  - Naja christyi Boulenger, 1904
  - Naja haje (Linnaeus, 1758)
  - Naja melanoleuca Hallowell, 1857
  - Naja mossambica Peters, 1854
  - Naja multifasciata (Werner, 1902)
  - Naja nigricollis Reinhardt, 1843
  - Pseudohaje goldii (Boulenger, 1895)
- Family Leptotyphlopidae – 6 species in 3 genera:
  - Guinea sundewalli (Jan, 1862) possibly in (N, W) DRC
  - Leptotyphlops conjunctus (Jan, 1861)
  - Leptotyphlops emini (Boulenger, 1890)
  - Leptotyphlops kafubi (Boulenger, 1919)
  - Leptotyphlops nigricans (Schlegel, 1839)
  - Myriopholis perreti (Roux-Estève, 1979) possibly, but not reported, in (W) DRC
- Family Typhlopidae – 17 species in 4 genera:
  - Afrotyphlops angolensis (Bocage, 1866)
  - Afrotyphlops congestus (Duméril & Bibron, 1844)
  - Afrotyphlops lineolatus Jan, 1864 probably in (E) DRC
  - Afrotyphlops punctatus (Leach, 1819)
  - Afrotyphlops schmidti (Laurent, 1956)
  - Afrotyphlops steinhausi Werner, 1909
  - Letheobia caeca (Duméril, 1856)
  - Letheobia gracilis (Sternfeld, 1910)
  - Letheobia graueri (Sternfeld, 1912)
  - Letheobia kibarae (De Witte, 1953)
  - Letheobia rufescens (Chabanaud, 1916)
  - Letheobia sudanensis (Schmidt, 1923)
  - Letheobia wittei (Roux-Estève, 1974)
  - Megatyphlops mucruso (Peters, 1854)
  - Megatyphlops schlegelii (Bianconi, 1847)
  - Rhinotyphlops praeocularis (Stejneger, 1894)
  - Rhinotyphlops stejnegeri (Loveridge, 1931)
- Family Viperidae – 13 species in 3 genera:
  - Atheris hispida Laurent, 1955
  - Atheris katangensis De Witte, 1953
  - Atheris nitschei Tornier, 1902
  - Atheris squamigera (Hallowell, 1854)
  - Bitis arietans (Merrem, 1820)
  - Bitis gabonica (Duméril, Bibron & Duméril, 1854)
  - Bitis nasicornis (Shaw, 1802)
  - Causus bilineatus Boulenger, 1905
  - Causus defilippii (Jan, 1862)
  - Causus lichtensteinii (Jan, 1859)
  - Causus maculatus (Hallowell, 1842)
  - Causus resimus (Peters, 1862)
  - Causus rhombeatus (Lichtenstein, 1823)

== Order Testudines - turtles ==
22 species in 8 genera in 5 families

- Family Cheloniidae – 1 species:
  - Chelonia mydas (Linnaeus, 1758)
- Family Dermochelyidae – 1 species:
  - Dermochelys coriacea (Vandelli, 1761)
- Family Pelomedusidae – 13 species in 2 genera:
  - Pelomedusa subrufa (Bonnaterre, 1789)
  - Pelusios bechuanicus Fitzsimons, 1932
  - Pelusios carinatus Laurent, 1956
  - Pelusios castaneus (Schweigger, 1812)
  - Pelusios chapini Laurent, 1965
  - Pelusios gabonensis (Duméril, 1856)
  - Pelusios nanus Laurent, 1956
  - Pelusios niger (Duméril & Bibron, 1835) probably in DRC
  - Pelusios rhodesianus Hewitt, 1927
  - Pelusios sinuatus (Smith, 1838)
  - Pelusios subniger (Lacépède, 1789)
  - Pelusios upembae Broadley, 1981
  - Pelusios williamsi Laurent, 1965
- Family Testudinidae – 5 species in 2 genera:
  - Kinixys belliana Gray, 1831
  - Kinixys erosa (Schweigger, 1812)
  - Kinixys homeana Bell, 1827
  - Kinixys spekii Gray, 1863
  - Stigmochelys pardalis (Bell, 1828)
- Family Trionychidae – 2 species in 2 genera:
  - Cycloderma aubryi (Duméril, 1856)
  - Trionyx triunguis (Forskål, 1775)

== See also ==
- Reptile
- List of reptiles
- List of birds of the Democratic Republic of Congo
- List of mammals of the Democratic Republic of the Congo
- List of amphibians of the Democratic Republic of the Congo

=== Sources ===
- Broadley, D. G. (1998). "The reptilian fauna of the Democratic Republic of the Congo (Congo-Kinshasa)". In: Schmidt, K. P. and Noble, G. K. Contributions to the Herpetology of the Belgian Congo. (reprint of the 1919 and 1923 papers). SSAR Facsimile reprints in Herpetology, 780 pp.
- Uetz, P. et al. (eds) The Reptile Database (formerly the EMBL/EBI Reptile Database, more recently the TIGR-Reptile Database).
