= List of reptiles and amphibians of the Eastern Highlands =

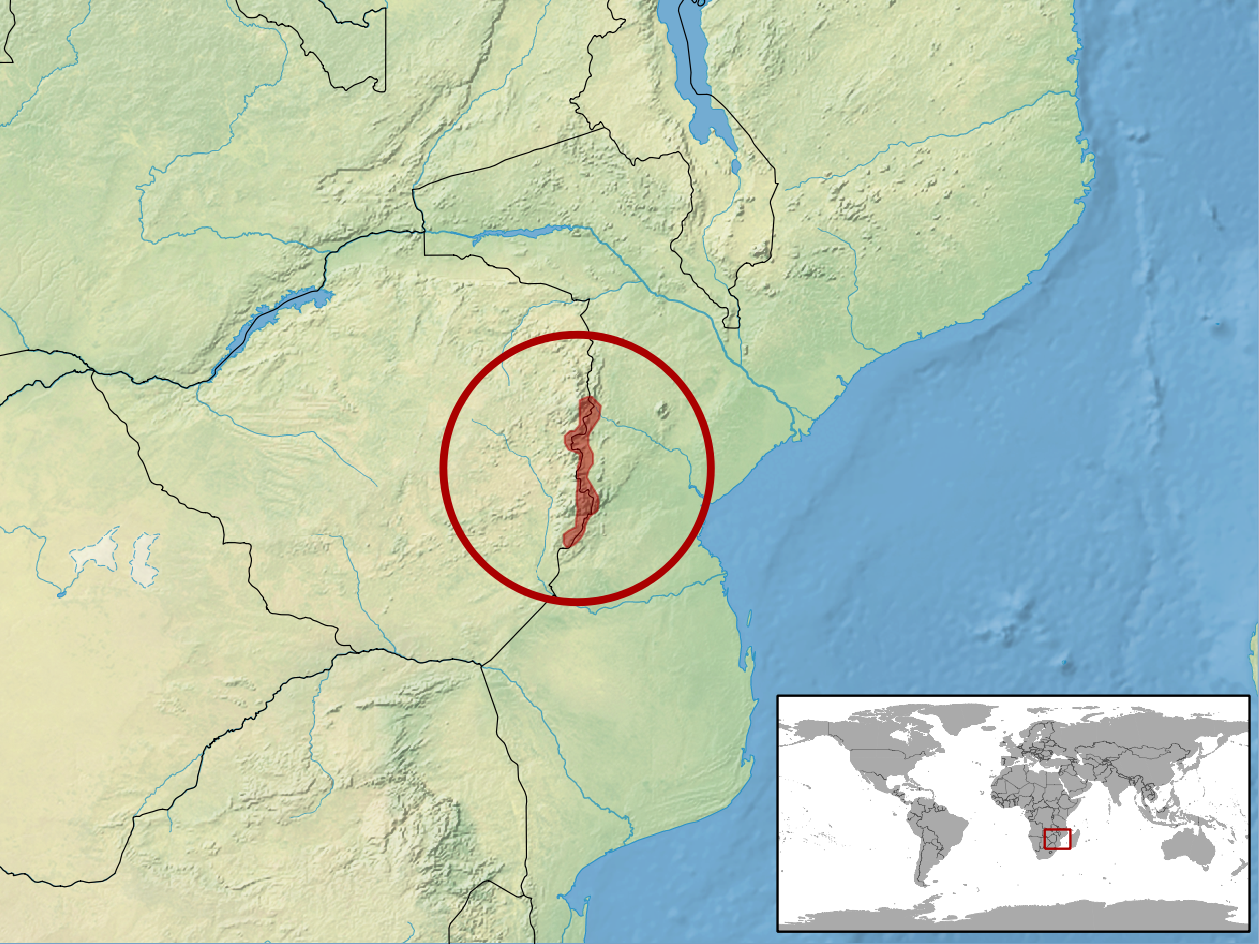
The range of Rhampholeon marshalli approximates the Eastern Highlands of Zimbabwe and Mozambique

The reptiles and amphibians of the Eastern Highlands of Zimbabwe and Mozambique mark a biodiversity hotspot for herpetofauna. Diverse reptile and amphibian communities include endemic species.

== Geography and climate ==
The Eastern Highlands extend 300 kilometres (190 mi) along Zimbabwe's eastern border with Mozambique. There are two broadly defined high-altitude ecological habitats in the Eastern Zimbabwe montane forest-grassland mosaic; a wet lowland forest ecology predominates the eastern side of the mountain ranges, while a more arid ecology dominates the western side. The Highlands have a more equable climate than Zimbabwe's central plateau, with higher rainfall, low cloud and heavy mists and dew as moisture moves inland from the Indian Ocean. Many streams and rivers originate in these mountains, which form the watershed between the Zambezi and Save river systems.

== Species lists ==
Native amphibians

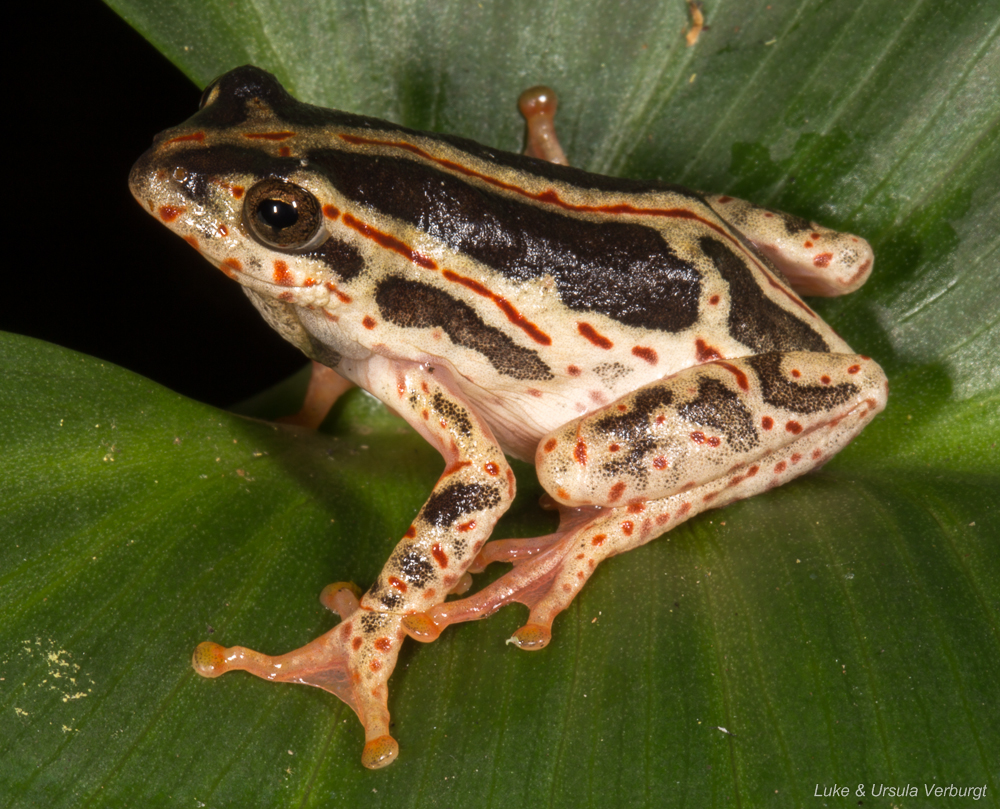
Hyperolius swynnertoni at Seldomseen, Vumba

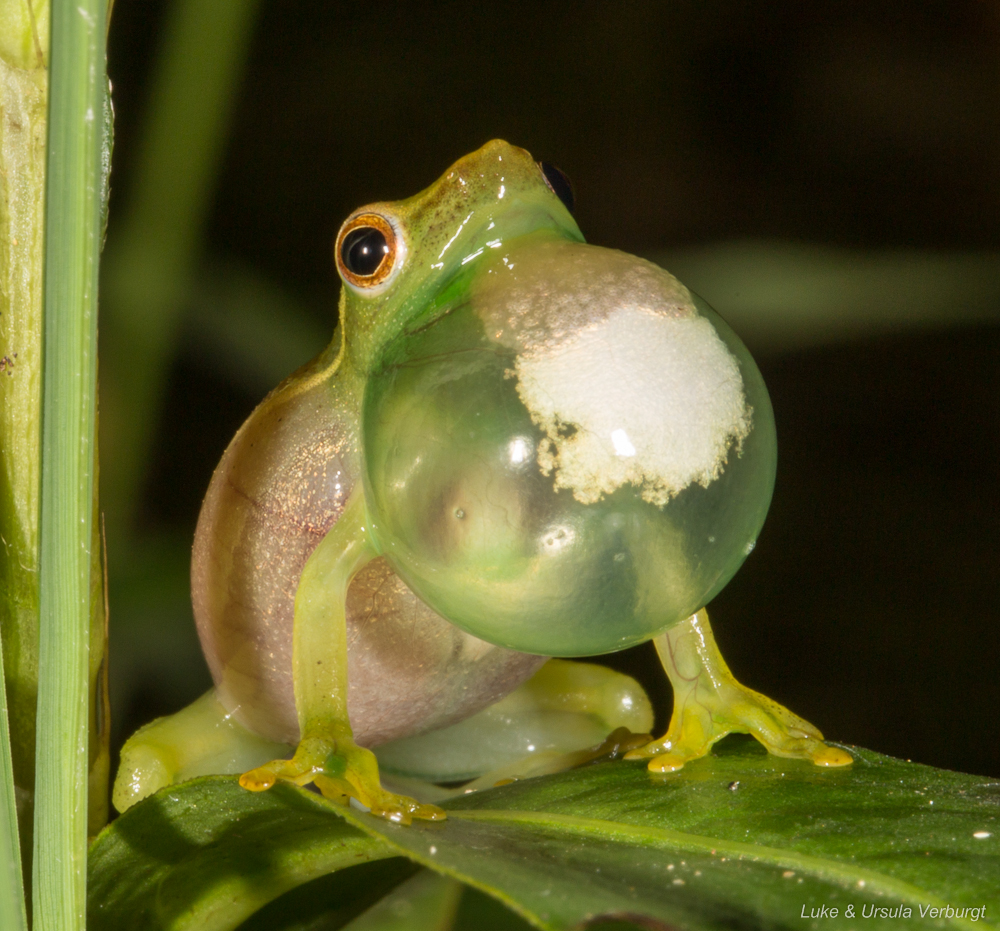
Hyperolius acuticeps at Seldomseen, Vumba

=== Tortoises ===
- Leopard tortoise, Geochelone pardalis babcocki: Very large specimens of this species live in the Nyanga and Chipinge Downs. Juveniles are preyed on by ground hornbills and secretarybirds.
- Speke's hinge-back tortoise, Kinixys spekii: specialists of kopje areas and live amongst the boulders of granite outcrops.

=== Lizards and amphisbaenians ===
==== Skinks ====
- Arnold's skink, Proscelotes arnoldi – endemic

==== Geckos ====
- Bernard's dwarf gecko, Lygodactylus bernardi (Fitzsimmons, 1958) – endemic to the Nyanga Mountains of Zimbabwe and Mozambique
- Cape dwarf gecko, Lygodactylus capensis (A. Smith, 1849)

==== Chameleons ====
- Marshall's pygmy chameleon or Marshall's leaf chameleon, Rhampholeon marshalli – endemic

==== Amphisbaenians ====
- Swynnerton's worm lizard, Chirindia swynnertoni – Mozambique plain and adjacent Zimbabwe
- Ferocious round-headed worm lizard, Zygaspis ferox – endemic to Chirinda Forest and vicinity
- Rhodesian spade-snouted worm lizard, Monopeltis rhodesiana – ranges to Malawi

=== Snakes ===
- Dusky-bellied water snake, Lycodonomorphus laevissimus
- Common brown water snake, Lycodonomorphus rufulus
- Whyte's water snake, Lycodonomorphus whytii
- African house snake, Boaedon fuliginosus
- Cape wolf snake, Lycophidion capense
- Variegated wolf snake, Lycophidion variegatum
- Dwarf wolf snake, Lycophidion nanum
- Cape file snake, Limaformosa capensis
- Black file snake, Gracililima nyassae
- Common slug eater, Duberria lutrix
- Mole snake, Pseudaspis cana
- Forest marsh snake, Natriciteres fuliginoides
- Olive marsh snake, Natriciteres olivacea
- Eastern bark snake or Mopane snake, Hemirhagerrhis nototaenia
- Beaked snake, Rhamphiophis sp.
- Striped skaapsteker, Psammophylax tritaeniatus
- Eastern stripe-bellied sand snake, Psammophis orientalis
- Dwarf sand snake, Psammophis angolensis
- Short-snouted grass snake, Psammophis brevirostris
- Olive grass snake, Psammophis phillipsii
- Montane grass snake, Psammophis crucifer
- Bibron's burrowing asp, Atractaspis bibronii
- Reticulated centipede-eater, Aparallactus lunulatus
- Black centipede-eater, Aparallactus guentheri
- Cape centipede-eater, Aparallactus capensis
- Purple-glossed snake, Amblyodipsas sp.
- Spotted bush snake, Philothamnus semivariegatus
- Ornate green snake, Philothamnus ornatus
- Western green snake, Philothamnus angolensis
- Green water snake, Philothamnus hoplogaster
- Egg eater, Dasypeltis scabra
- Montane egg eater, Dasypeltis medici
- Red-lipped herald snake, Crotaphopeltis hotamboeia
- Tiger snake, Telescopus semiannulatus
- Marbled tree snake, Dipsadoboa aulica
- Boomslang, Dispholidus typus – venomous
- Savanna vine snake, Thelotornis capensis – venomous
- Mozambique spitting cobra, Naja mossambica – venomous
- Rinkhals, Hemachatus haemachatus – venomous
- Egyptian cobra, Naja haje – venomous
- Forest cobra, Naja melanoleuca – venomous
- Black mamba, Dendroaspis polylepis – highly venomous
- Eastern green mamba, Dendroaspis angusticeps – venomous
- Common night adder, Causus rhombeatus
- Snouted night adder, Causus defilippii
- Puff adder, Bitis arietans – highly venomous
- Gaboon viper, Bitis gabonica – highly venomous
- Berg adder, Bitis atropos – venomous

=== Frogs ===
- African clawed frog, Xenopus laevis
- Müller's platanna, Xenopus muelleri
- Inyanga toad, Vandijkophrynus inyangae
- Flat-backed toad, Sclerophrys pusilla
- Eastern olive toad, Sclerophrys garmani
- Northern pygmy toad, Poyntonophrynus fenoulheti
- Bufo grindleyi – endemic
- Boulenger's earless toad, Mertensophryne anotis – endemic
- African red toad or strawberry toad, Schismaderma carens Smith, 1848
- Forest rain frog, Probreviceps rhodesianus
- Mozambique rain frog, Breviceps mossambicus
- Common rain frog, Breviceps adspersus
- Angola river frog, Amietia angolensis
- Inyangani river frog, Amietia inyangae
- Chimanimani stream frog or Hewitt's long-nosed frog, Strongylopus rhodesianus
- Striped stream frog or striped long-toed frog, Strongylopus fasciatus
- Golden-backed frog, Amnirana darlingi
- Common squeaker, Arthroleptis stenodactylus
- Cave squeaker, Arthroleptis troglodytes – endemic
- Bush squeaker, Arthroleptis wahlbergii – endemic
- Yellow-spotted tree frog, Leptopelis flavomaculatus
- Bocage's tree frog, Leptopelis bocagii
- Tinker reed frog, Hyperolius tuberilinguis
- Sharpe-nosed reed frog, Hyperolius nasutus
- Marbled reed frog, Hyperolius marmoratus – endemic
- Swynnerton's reed frog, Hyperolius swynnertoni – endemic
- Aposematic reed frog, Hyperolius aposematicus – endemic
- Marbled snout-burrower or marbled shovel-nosed frog, Hemisus marmoratus

== Bibliography ==
- Branch, B. (2003). Snakes and other Reptiles of Southern Africa. Struik.
- Lambiris, Angelo J. L. (1989). "The Frogs of Zimbabwe". Natural Science Museum of Turin Monographs.
