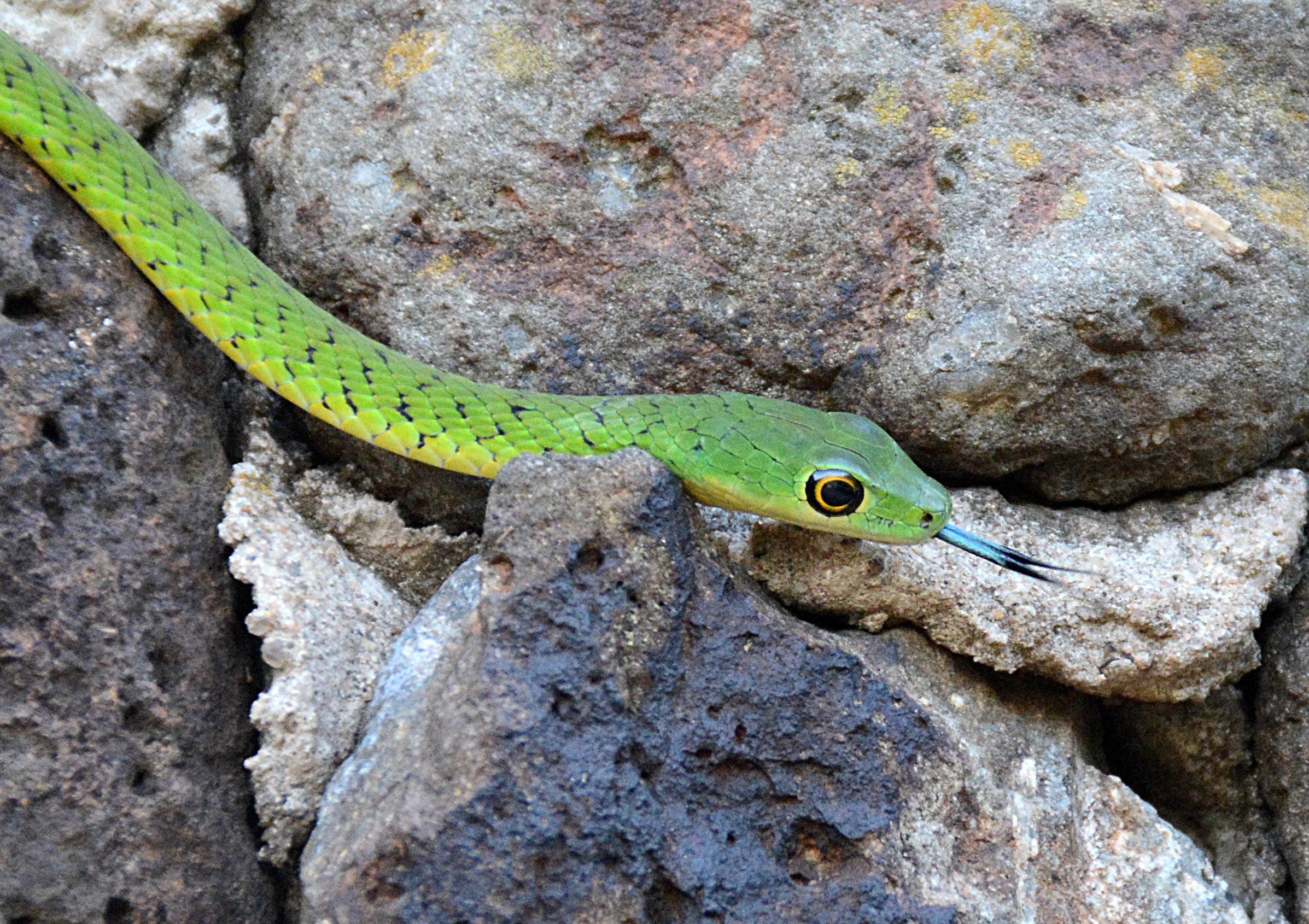

Conservation status
- Least Concern (IUCN 3.1)

Scientific classification
- Kingdom: Animalia
- Phylum: Chordata
- Class: Reptilia
- Order: Squamata
- Suborder: Serpentes
- Family: Colubridae
- Genus: Philothamnus
- Species: P. natalensis

Binomial name
- Philothamnus natalensis (Smith, 1848)

Synonyms
- Dendrophis natalensis Smith, 1848; Dendrophis albovariata Smith, 1848; Dendrophis subcarinatus Jan, 1869

= Philothamnus natalensis =

Species of reptile

Philothamnus natalensis, commonly known as the Natal green snake or eastern Natal green snake, is a species of snakes in the family Colubridae. The species is found in South Africa, Eswatini, Mozambique and Zimbabwe. Philothamnus occidentalis was previously considered a subspecies.
