= Philothamnus macrops =

Conservation status
- Least Concern (IUCN 3.1)

Scientific classification
- Kingdom: Animalia
- Phylum: Chordata
- Class: Reptilia
- Order: Squamata
- Suborder: Serpentes
- Family: Colubridae
- Genus: Philothamnus
- Species: P. macrops

Binomial name
- Philothamnus macrops (Boulenger, 1895)

Species of snake

Philothamnus macrops, the large-eyed green snake or Usambara green snake, is a species of snake of the family Colubridae.

The snake is found in Tanzania, Zanzibar, and Mozambique.
