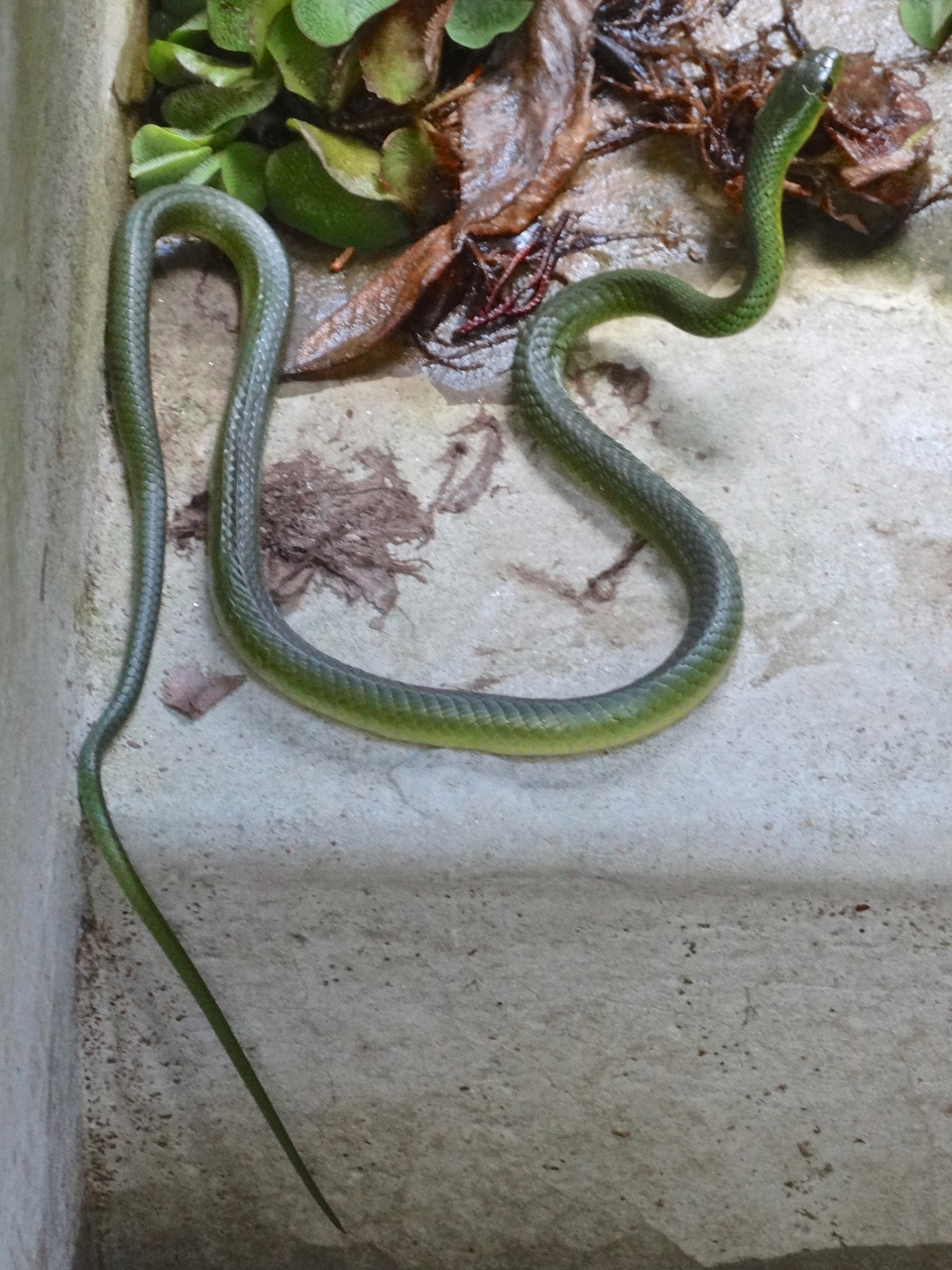
- adult
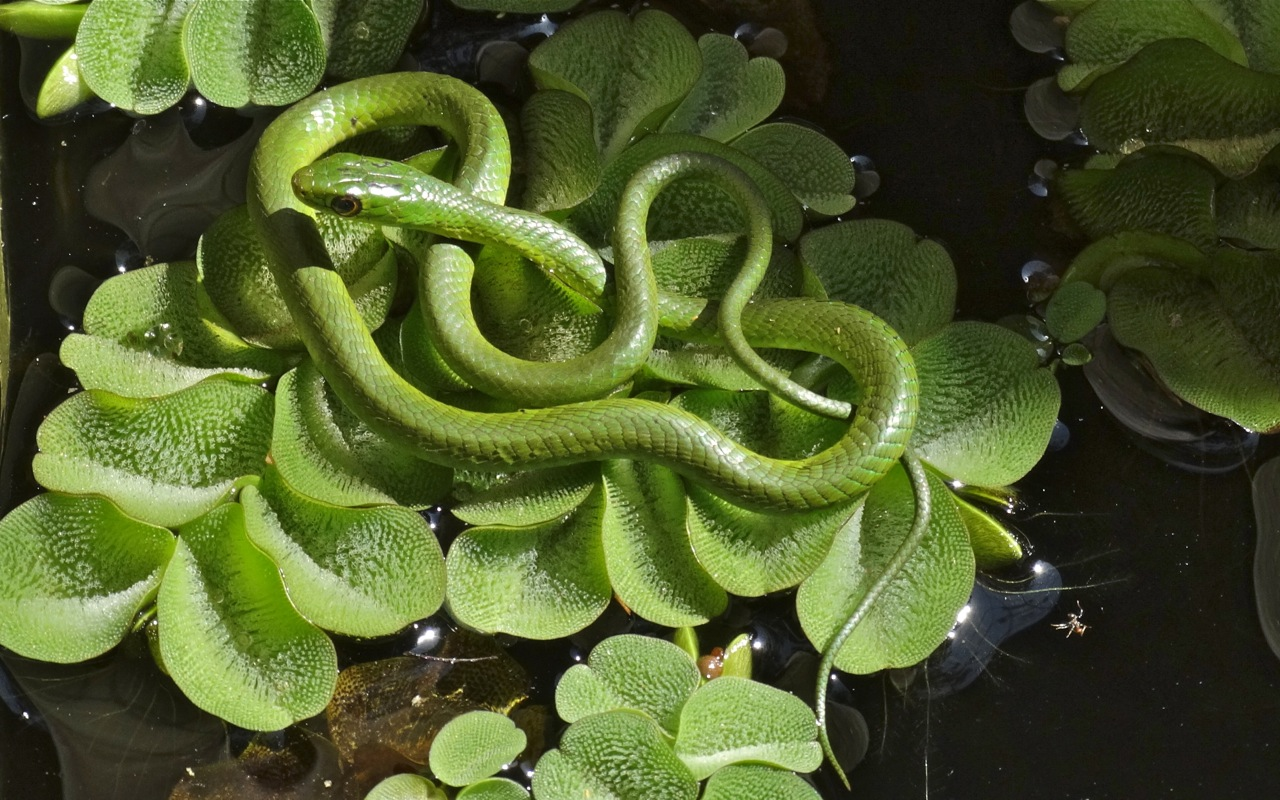
- juvenile

Conservation status
- Least Concern (IUCN 3.1)

Scientific classification
- Kingdom: Animalia
- Phylum: Chordata
- Class: Reptilia
- Order: Squamata
- Suborder: Serpentes
- Family: Colubridae
- Genus: Philothamnus
- Species: P. battersbyi

Binomial name
- Philothamnus battersbyi Loveridge, 1951

Synonyms
- Philothamnus irregularis battersbyi Loveridge, 1951; Philothamnus battersbyi — Rasmussen, 1981

= Philothamnus battersbyi =

Species of snake

Philothamnus battersbyi, also known commonly as Battersby's green snake, is a species of snake in the family Colubridae. The species is native to northeastern Africa.

== Etymology ==
The specific name, battersbyi, is in honor of British herpetologist James Clarence Battersby (1901–1993).

== Geographic range ==
P. battersbyi is found in Ethiopia, Kenya, Somalia, Sudan, Tanzania, and Uganda.

== Habitat ==
P. battersbyi is found in a variety of natural habitats close to water, including forest, savanna, grassland, and freshwater wetlands, at altitudes from sea level to 2,600 m (8,500 ft). It has also been found in polluted streams in major cities.

== Description ==
The holotype of P. battersbyi, an adult female, has a snout-to-vent length (SVL) of 76.2 cm (30.0 in) and a tail length of 28.3 centimetres (11.1 in).

== Behavior ==
P. battersbyi is arboreal and diurnal.

== Diet ==
P. battersbyi preys upon amphibians, which may include caecilians, frogs, and toads.

== Reproduction ==
P. battersbyi is oviparous. Clutch size is 3–11 eggs. Some communal nesting has been observed, with as many as 40 adult females laying over 100 eggs together in one nest.
