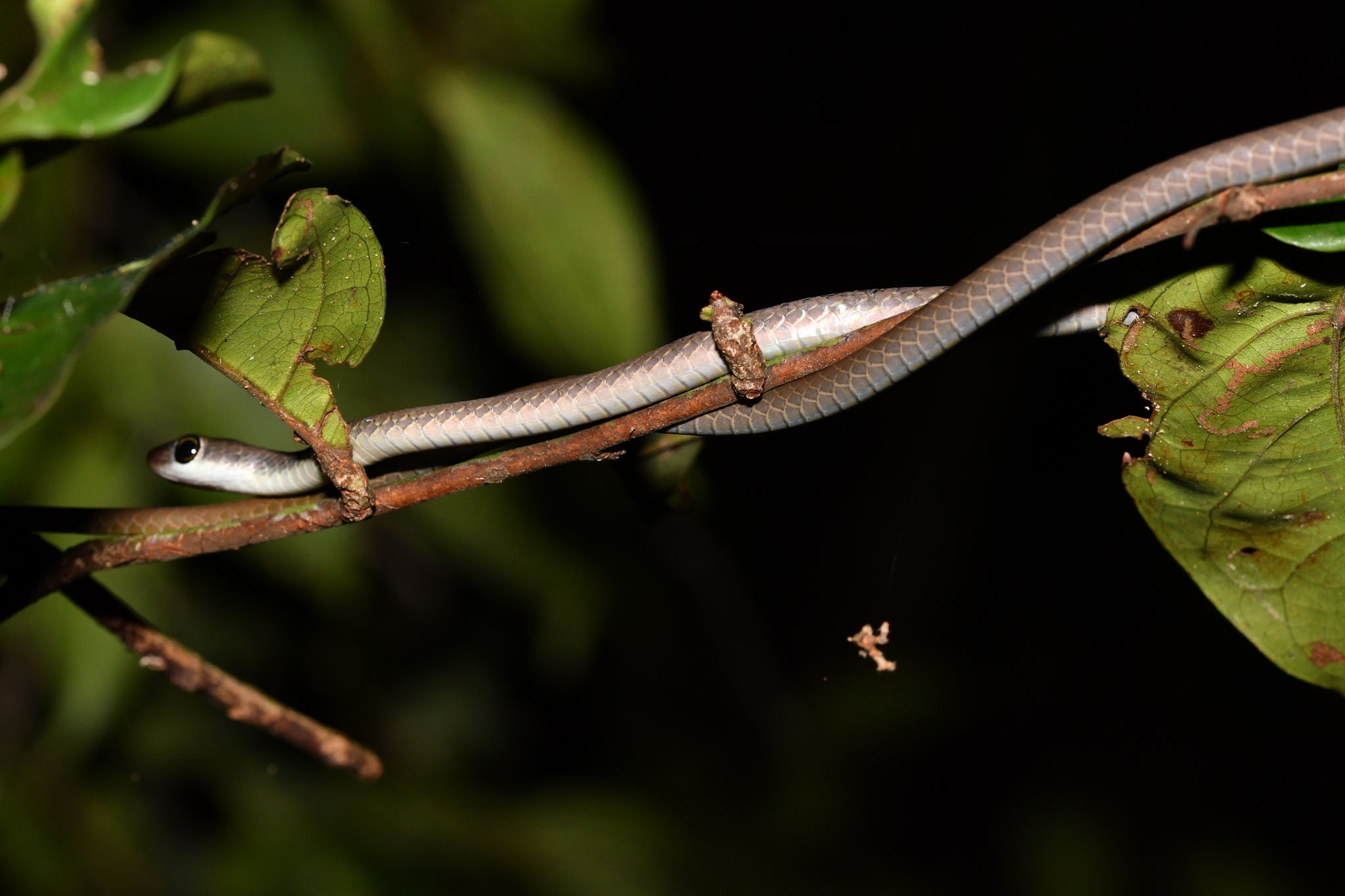

Scientific classification
- Kingdom: Animalia
- Phylum: Chordata
- Class: Reptilia
- Order: Squamata
- Suborder: Serpentes
- Family: Colubridae
- Genus: Philothamnus
- Species: P. brunneus

Binomial name
- Philothamnus brunneus Trape, Hughes, & Mediannikov, 2021

= Philothamnus brunneus =

Species of snake

Philothamnus brunneus is a species of snake in the family Colubridae.

The snake is found in Guinea.
