= Philothamnus ruandae =

Conservation status
- Least Concern (IUCN 3.1)

Scientific classification
- Kingdom: Animalia
- Phylum: Chordata
- Class: Reptilia
- Order: Squamata
- Suborder: Serpentes
- Family: Colubridae
- Genus: Philothamnus
- Species: P. ruandae

Binomial name
- Philothamnus ruandae Loveridge, 1951

Species of snake

Philothamnus ruandae, the Ruanda emerald green snake or Rwanda forest green snake, is a species of snake of the family Colubridae.

The snake is found in Rwanda, Republic of the Congo, and Uganda.
