= Philothamnus mayombensis =

Scientific classification
- Kingdom: Animalia
- Phylum: Chordata
- Class: Reptilia
- Order: Squamata
- Suborder: Serpentes
- Family: Colubridae
- Genus: Philothamnus
- Species: P. mayombensis

Binomial name
- Philothamnus mayombensis Trape, Collet, Hughes, & Mediannikov, 2021

Species of snake

Philothamnus mayombensis, the Mayombe bush snake, is a species of snake of the family Colubridae.

The snake is found in the Democratic Republic of Congo.
