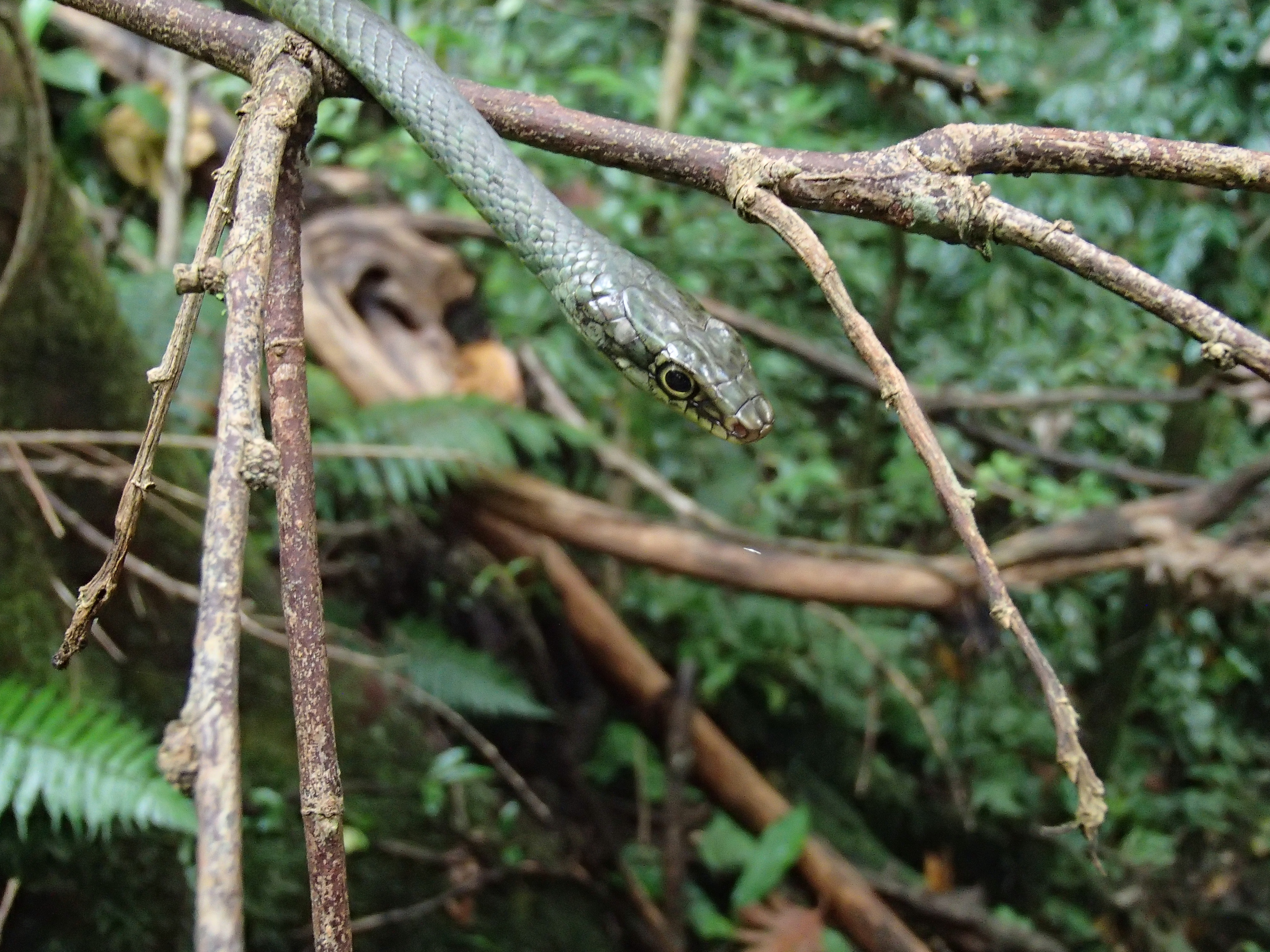

Conservation status
- Least Concern (IUCN 3.1)

Scientific classification
- Kingdom: Animalia
- Phylum: Chordata
- Class: Reptilia
- Order: Squamata
- Suborder: Serpentes
- Family: Colubridae
- Genus: Philothamnus
- Species: P. thomensis

Binomial name
- Philothamnus thomensis Bocage, 1882

= Philothamnus thomensis =

Species of snake

Pthilothamnus thomensis (São Tomé wood snake) is a species of snakes of the family Colubridae. It is endemic to the island of São Tomé in São Tomé and Príncipe. The species was described in 1882 by José Vicente Barbosa du Bocage.
