= Hydraethiops =

Scientific classification
- Kingdom: Animalia
- Phylum: Chordata
- Class: Reptilia
- Order: Squamata
- Suborder: Serpentes
- Family: Colubridae
- Subfamily: Natricinae
- Genus: Hydraethiops; Günther, 1872

Genus of snakes

Hydraethiops is a genus of snakes in the subfamily Natricinae of the family Colubridae. The genus is endemic to Central Africa.

== Species ==
The genus Hydraethiops contains two species which are recognized as being valid.

- Hydraethiops laevis Boulenger, 1904
- Hydraethiops melanogaster Günther, 1872 — blackbelly snake
