= Philothamnus pobeguini =

Scientific classification
- Kingdom: Animalia
- Phylum: Chordata
- Class: Reptilia
- Order: Squamata
- Suborder: Serpentes
- Family: Colubridae
- Genus: Philothamnus
- Species: P. pobeguini

Binomial name
- Philothamnus pobeguini (Chabanaud, 1916)

Species of snake

Philothamnus pobeguini is a species of snake of the family Colubridae.

The snake is found in Guinea.
