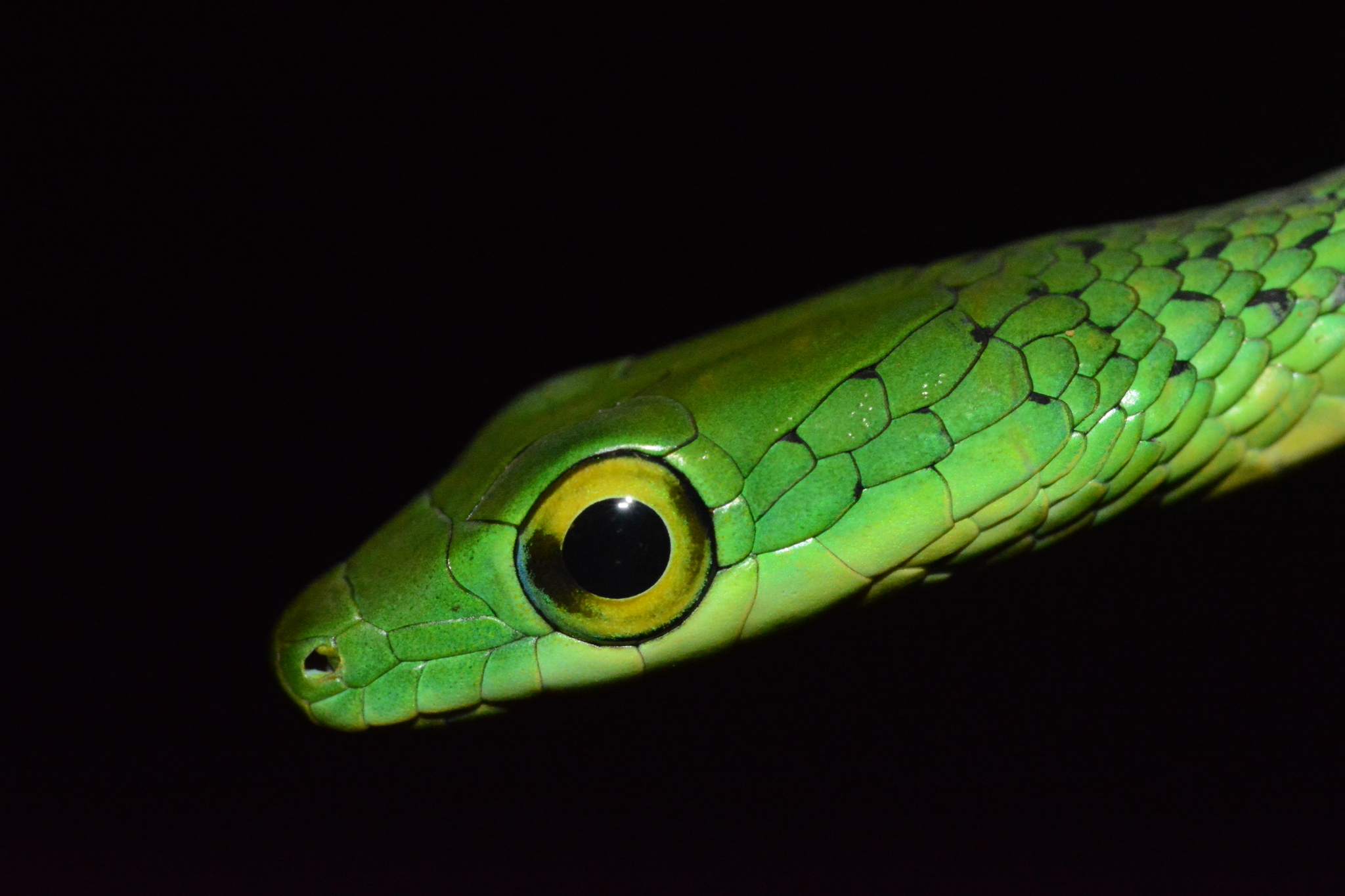
- Philothamnus punctatus

Conservation status
- Least Concern (IUCN 3.1)

Scientific classification
- Kingdom: Animalia
- Phylum: Chordata
- Class: Reptilia
- Order: Squamata
- Suborder: Serpentes
- Family: Colubridae
- Genus: Philothamnus
- Species: P. punctatus

Binomial name
- Philothamnus punctatus Peters, 1867

= Philothamnus punctatus =

Species of snake

Philothamnus punctatus, the spotted green snake, is a species of snake of the family Colubridae.

The snake is found in central Africa.
