= Hydraethiops laevis =

Conservation status
- Data Deficient (IUCN 3.1)

Scientific classification
- Kingdom: Animalia
- Phylum: Chordata
- Class: Reptilia
- Order: Squamata
- Suborder: Serpentes
- Family: Colubridae
- Genus: Hydraethiops
- Species: H. laevis

Binomial name
- Hydraethiops laevis Boulenger, 1904

Species of snake

Hydraethiops laevis is a species of natricine snake found in Cameroon and Gabon.
