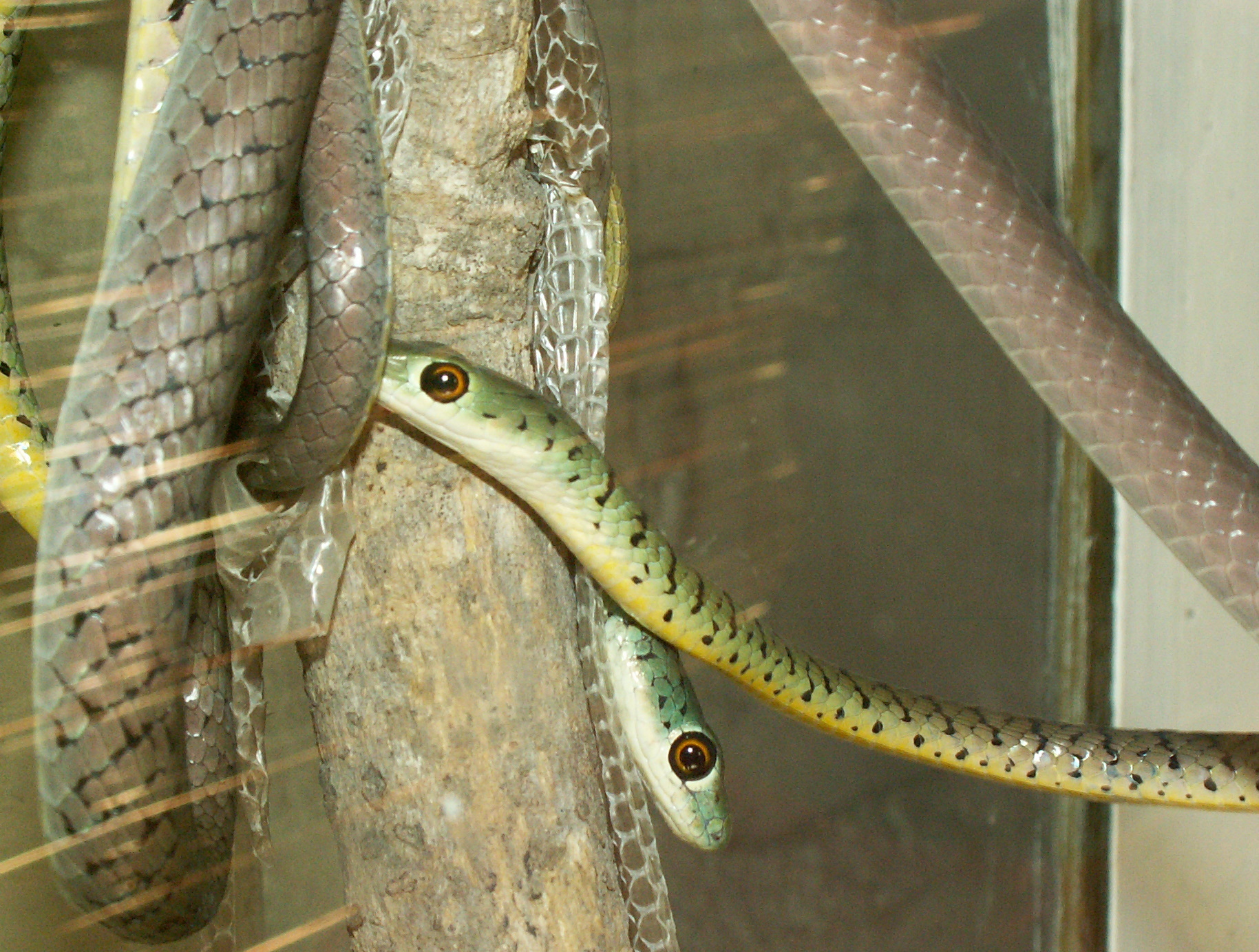
- Philothamnus semivariegatus

Scientific classification
- Kingdom: Animalia
- Phylum: Chordata
- Class: Reptilia
- Order: Squamata
- Suborder: Serpentes
- Family: Colubridae
- Subfamily: Colubrinae
- Genus: Philothamnus; A. Smith, 1847

= Philothamnus =

Genus of snakes

Philothamnus is a genus of snakes in the subfamily Colubrinae of the family Colubridae. The genus is endemic to Sub-Saharan Africa and includes both forest- and savanna-associated species as well as generalists. All Crotaphopeltis are arboreal.

== Species ==
The following 24 species are recognised as being valid.

- Philothamnus angolensis Bocage, 1882 – Angola green snake, western green snake
- Philothamnus battersbyi Loveridge, 1951 – Battersby's green snake
- Philothamnus belli (Günther, 1866)
- Philothamnus bequaerti (Schmidt, 1923) – Bequaert's green snake
- Philothamnus brunneus J. Trape, Hughes & Mediannikov, 2021
- Philothamnus carinatus (Andersson, 1901) – thirteen-scaled green snake
- Philothamnus dorsalis (Bocage, 1866) – striped green snake, striped wood snake
- Philothamnus girardi Bocage, 1893 – Girard's green snake, Annobon wood snake
- Philothamnus heterodermus (Hallowell, 1857) – emerald green snake, variable green snake
- Philothamnus heterolepidotus (Günther, 1863) – slender green snake
- Philothamnus hoplogaster (Günther, 1863) – southeastern green snake, green water snake
- Philothamnus hughesi J. Trape & Roux-Estève, 1990 – Hughes's green snake
- Philothamnus irregularis (Leach, 1819) – northern green bush snake, irregular green snake
- Philothamnus macrops (Boulenger, 1895) – large-eyed green snake, Usambara green snake
- Philothamnus mayombensis J. Trape, Collet, Hughes & Mediannikov, 2021 – Mayombe bush snake
- Philothamnus natalensis (A. Smith, 1848) – Natal green snake, eastern Natal green snake
- Philothamnus nitidus (Günther, 1863) – green bush snake, Cameroons wood snake
- Philothamnus occidentalis (Broadley, 1966) – western Natal green snake, South African green snake
- Philothamnus ornatus Bocage, 1872 – ornate green snake
- Philothamnus pobeguini (Chabanaud, 1916)
- Philothamnus punctatus W. Peters, 1867 – spotted green snake
- Philothamnus ruandae Loveridge, 1951 – Ruanda emerald green snake, Rwanda forest green snake
- Philothamnus semivariegatus (A. Smith, 1840) – spotted bush snake
- Philothamnus thomensis Bocage, 1882 – São Tomé wood snake
- Philothamnus chifunderai Greenbaum, Pauwels, Gvoždík, Vaughan, Chaney, Buontempo, Aristote, Muninga & Engelbrecht, 2023

Nota bene: A binomial authority in parentheses indicates that the species was originally described in a genus other than Philothamnus.
