= Philothamnus belli =

Scientific classification
- Kingdom: Animalia
- Phylum: Chordata
- Class: Reptilia
- Order: Squamata
- Suborder: Serpentes
- Family: Colubridae
- Genus: Philothamnus
- Species: P. belli

Binomial name
- Philothamnus belli (Günther, 1866)

Species of snake

Philothamnus belli is a species of snake in the subfamily Colubrinae of the family Colubridae. The species is native to coastal West Africa.

== Geographic range ==
P. belli is found in Guinea and Sierra Leone.
