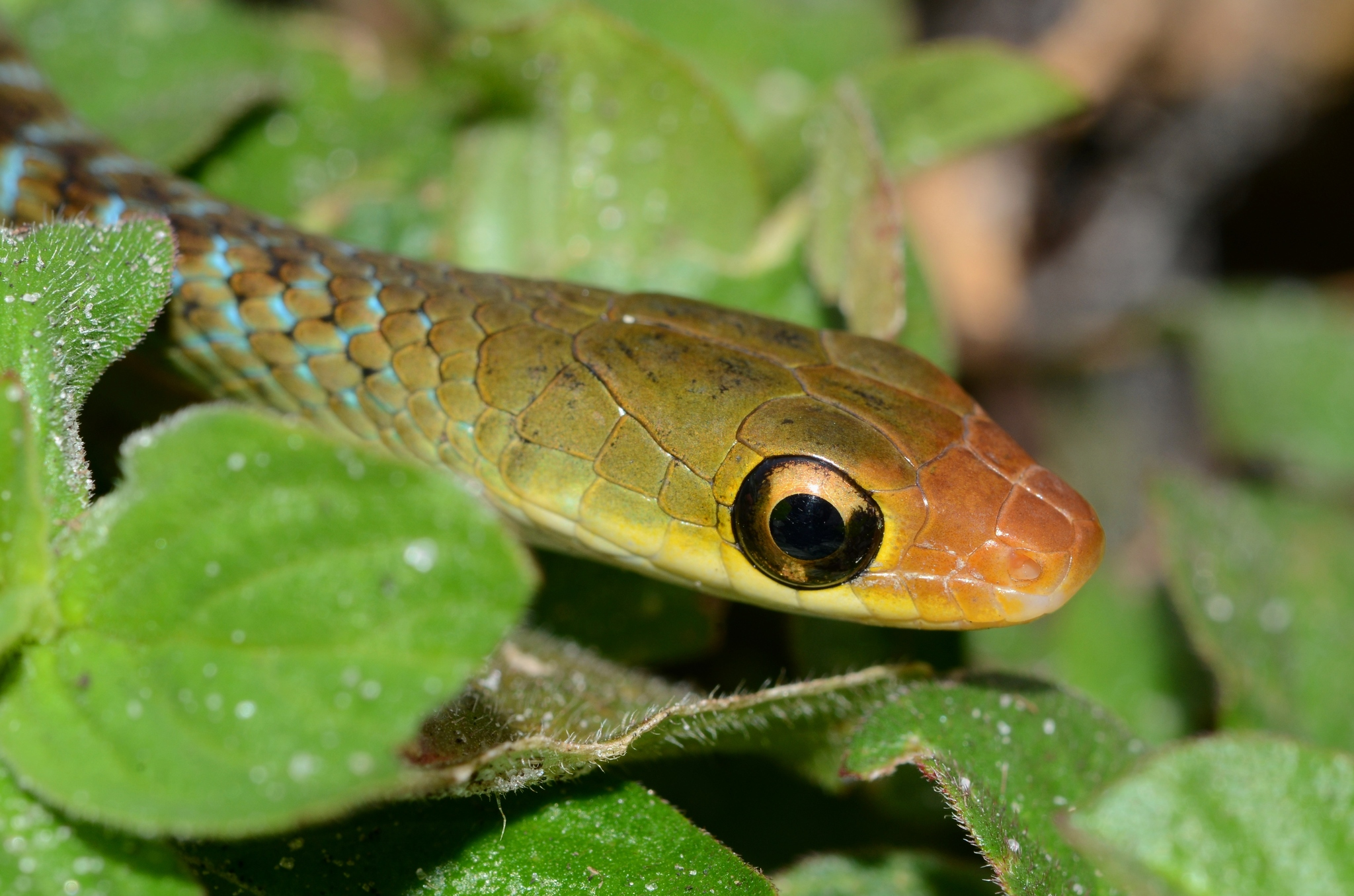
- Striped Green Snake (Philothamnus dorsalis) in the Republic of Congo

Conservation status
- Least Concern (IUCN 3.1)

Scientific classification
- Kingdom: Animalia
- Phylum: Chordata
- Class: Reptilia
- Order: Squamata
- Suborder: Serpentes
- Family: Colubridae
- Genus: Philothamnus
- Species: P. dorsalis

Binomial name
- Philothamnus dorsalis (Bocage, 1866)

= Philothamnus dorsalis =

Species of snake

Philothamnus dorsalis, the striped green snake or striped wood snake, is a species of snake of the family Colubridae.

The snake is found in central Africa.
