= Philothamnus nitidus =

Conservation status
- Least Concern (IUCN 3.1)

Scientific classification
- Kingdom: Animalia
- Phylum: Chordata
- Class: Reptilia
- Order: Squamata
- Suborder: Serpentes
- Family: Colubridae
- Genus: Philothamnus
- Species: P. nitidus

Binomial name
- Philothamnus nitidus (Günther, 1863)

Synonyms
- Ahaetulla nitida Günther, 1863; Ahaetulla lagoensis Günther, 1872; Philothamnus semivariegatus nitidus (Günther, 1863)

Species of snake

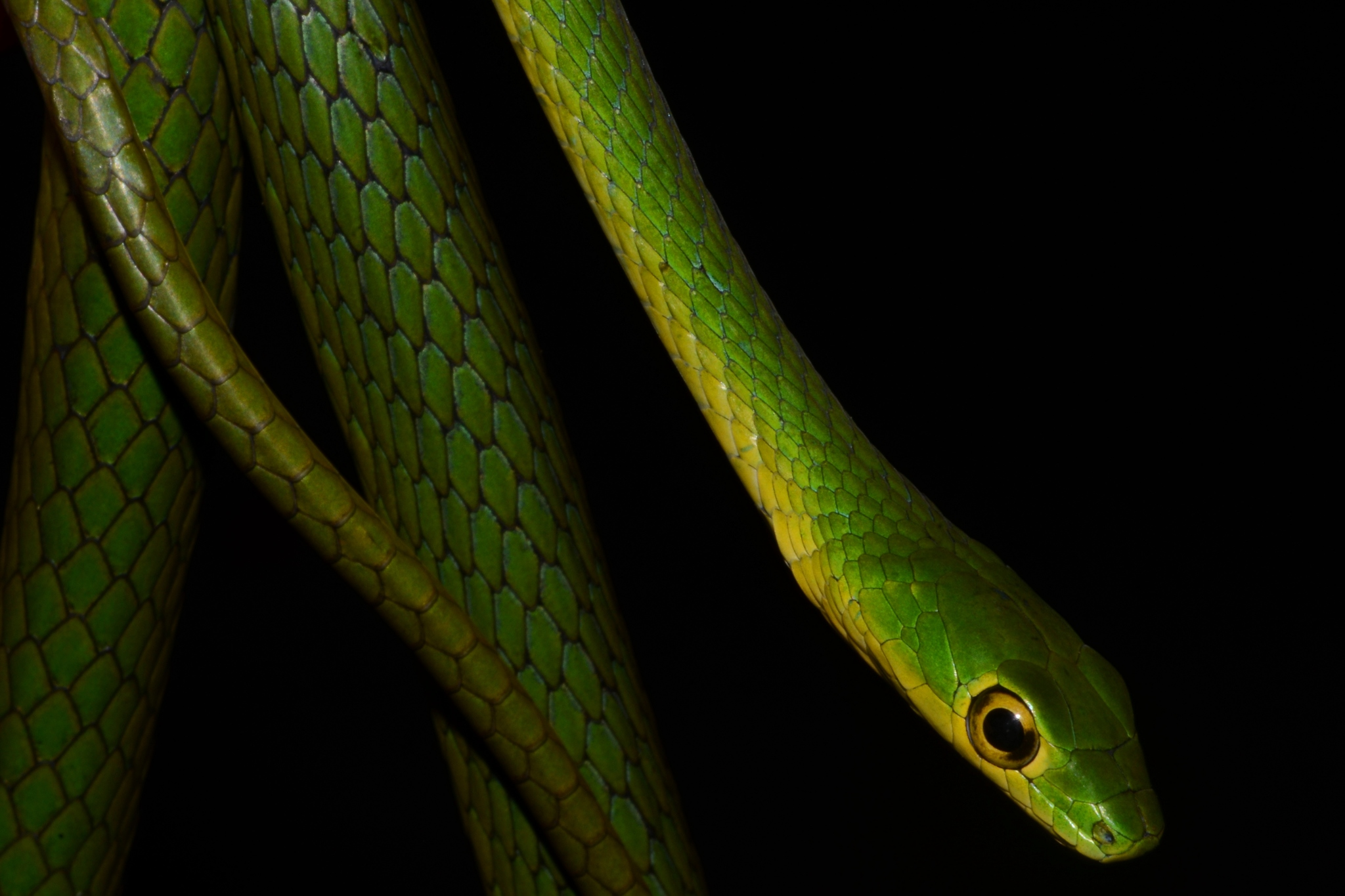
Green bush snake (Philothamnus nitidus) in Republic of Congo

Philothamnus nitidus, also known commonly as the green bush snake, the Cameroons wood snake, and Loveridge's green snake, is a species of snake in the subfamily Colubrinae of the family Colubridae. The species is native to central Africa. There are two recognized subspecies.

== Description ==
Adults of Philothamnus nitidus usually have a total length (tail included) of 50–80 cm (20–31 in). The maximum recorded total length is 93 cm (37 in). The eye is large, with a yellow or orange iris, and a round pupil. The body is cylindrical, and the tail is very long, more than one third of the total length. The dorsal scales are smooth, and are arranged in 15 rows at midbody. The coloration is bluish green to emerald green dorsally, and paler green ventrally.

== Geographic range ==
Philothamnus nitidus is found in Angola, Benin, Burundi, Cameroon, Central African Republic, Democratic Republic of the Congo, Republic of the Congo, Gabon, Ghana, Guinea, Equatorial Guinea, Ivory Coast, Kenya, Liberia, Nigeria, Rwanda, Sierra Leone, Tanzania, Togo, and Uganda.

== Habitat ==
The preferred natural habitats of Philothamnus nitidus are forest and savanna, at altitudes from sea level to 1,200 m (3,900 ft).

== Behavior ==
Philothamnus nitidus is arboreal and diurnal.

== Reproduction ==
Philothamnus nitidus is oviparous.

== Subspecies ==
Two subspecies are recognized as being valid, including the nominotypical subspecies.

- Philothamnus nitidus loveridgei Laurent, 1960
- Philothamnus nitidus nitidus (Günther, 1863)

Nota bene: A trinomial authority in parentheses indicates that the subspecies was originally described in a genus other than Philothamnus.

== Etymology ==
The subspecific name, loveridgei, is in honor of herpetologist Arthur Loveridge.
