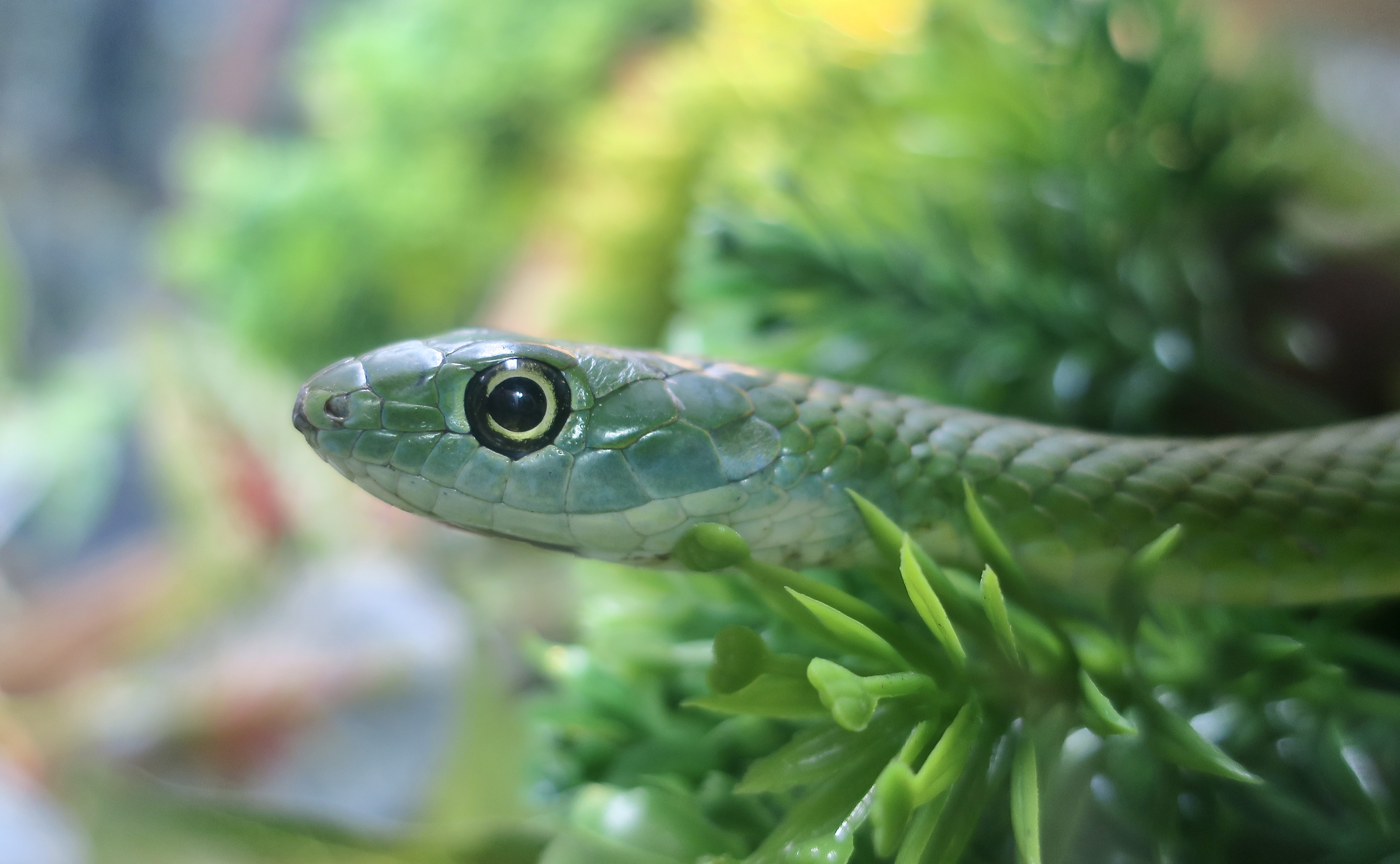

Conservation status
- Least Concern (IUCN 3.1)

Scientific classification
- Kingdom: Animalia
- Phylum: Chordata
- Class: Reptilia
- Order: Squamata
- Suborder: Serpentes
- Family: Colubridae
- Genus: Philothamnus
- Species: P. irregularis

Binomial name
- Philothamnus irregularis (Leach, 1819)

= Philothamnus irregularis =

Species of snake

Philothamnus irregularis, the northern green bush snake or irregular green snake, is a species of snake of the family Colubridae.

The snake is found in central Africa.

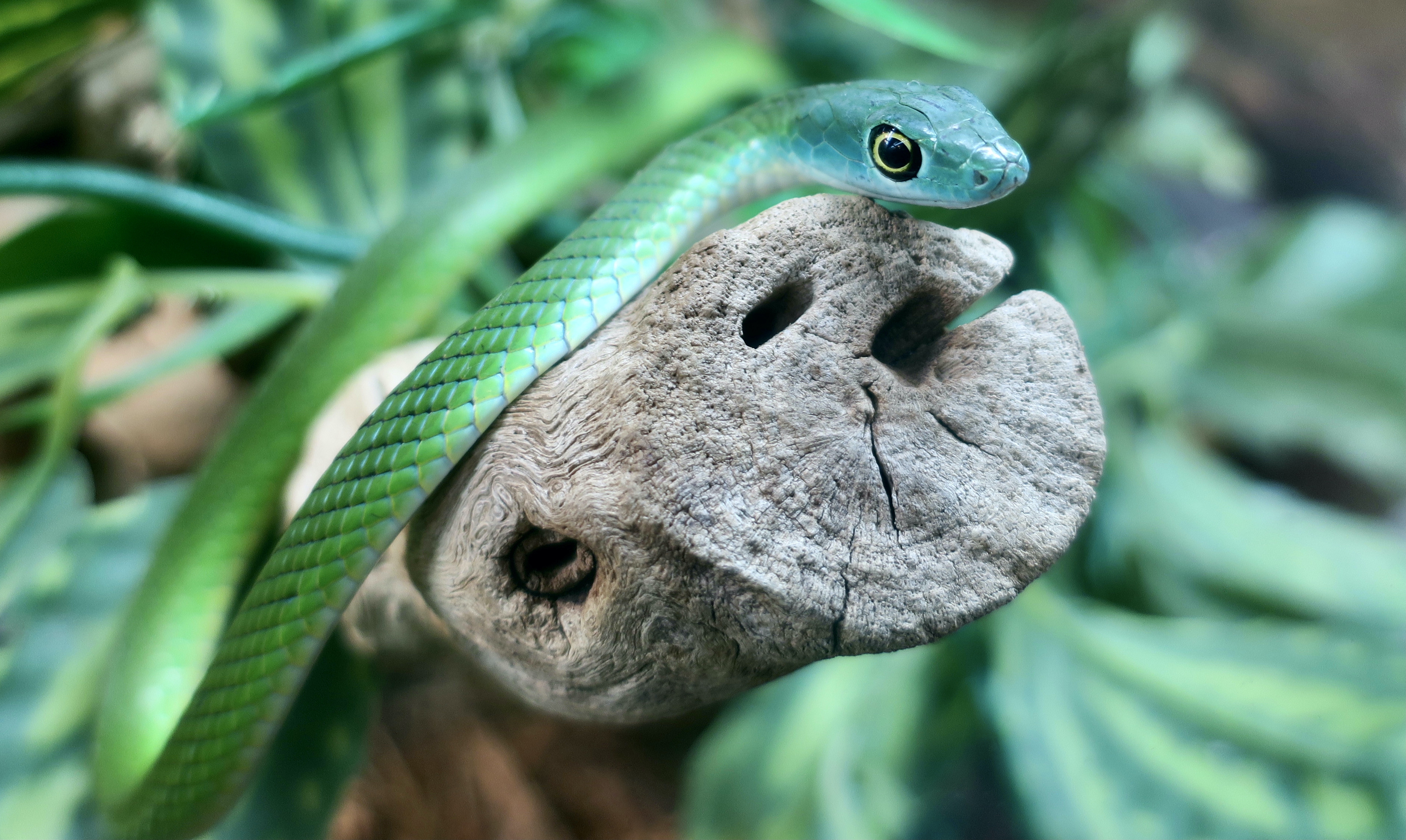
A northern green bush snake at a reptile store in Miami.
