= Philothamnus hughesi =

Conservation status
- Least Concern (IUCN 3.1)

Scientific classification
- Kingdom: Animalia
- Phylum: Chordata
- Class: Reptilia
- Order: Squamata
- Suborder: Serpentes
- Family: Colubridae
- Genus: Philothamnus
- Species: P. hughesi

Binomial name
- Philothamnus hughesi J.-F. Trape & Roux-Estève, 1990

Species of snake

Philothamnus hughesi, also known commonly as Hughes' green snake or Hughes's green snake, is a species of snake in the subfamily Colubrinae of the family Colubridae. The species is native to central Africa.

== Etymology ==
The specific name, hughesi, is in honor of British herpetologist Barry Hughes.

== Geographic range ==
P. hughesi is found in Cameroon, Central African Republic, Democratic Republic of the Congo, Republic of the Congo, Gabon, South Sudan, and Uganda.

== Habitat ==
The preferred natural habitat of P. hughesi is savanna, at altitudes from sea level to 2,100 m (6,900 ft).

== Behavior ==
P. hughesi is arboreal.

== Reproduction ==
P. hughesi is oviparous.
