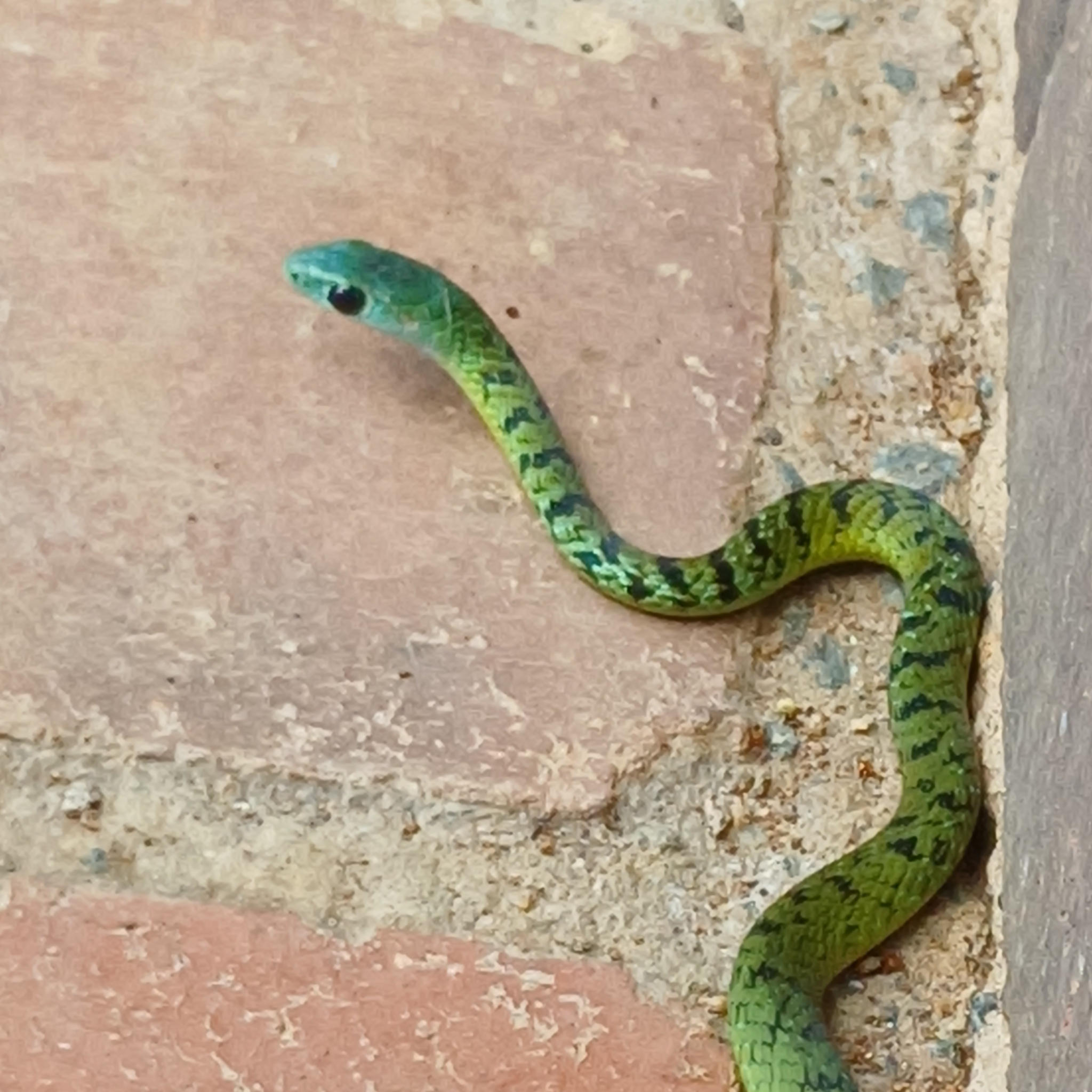

Conservation status
- Least Concern (IUCN 3.1)

Scientific classification
- Kingdom: Animalia
- Phylum: Chordata
- Class: Reptilia
- Order: Squamata
- Suborder: Serpentes
- Family: Colubridae
- Genus: Philothamnus
- Species: P. occidentalis

Binomial name
- Philothamnus occidentalis Broadley, 1966

= Philothamnus occidentalis =

Species of snake

Philothamnus occidentalis, the western Natal green snake or South African green snake, is a species of snake of the family Colubridae.

The snake is found in South Africa.
