= Hydraethiops melanogaster =

Conservation status
- Least Concern (IUCN 3.1)

Scientific classification
- Kingdom: Animalia
- Phylum: Chordata
- Class: Reptilia
- Order: Squamata
- Suborder: Serpentes
- Family: Colubridae
- Genus: Hydraethiops
- Species: H. melanogaster

Binomial name
- Hydraethiops melanogaster Günther, 1872

Species of snake

Hydraethiops melanogaster, the blackbelly snake, is a species of natricine snake found in Gabon, the Democratic Republic of the Congo, the Republic of the Congo, the Central African Republic, Cameroon, and South Sudan.
