= Philothamnus bequaerti =

Conservation status
- Least Concern (IUCN 3.1)

Scientific classification
- Kingdom: Animalia
- Phylum: Chordata
- Class: Reptilia
- Order: Squamata
- Suborder: Serpentes
- Family: Colubridae
- Genus: Philothamnus
- Species: P. bequaerti

Binomial name
- Philothamnus bequaerti (Schmidt, 1923)

Species of snake

Philothamnus bequaerti, commonly known as Bequaert's green snake, is a species of snake in the subfamily Colubrinae of the family Colubridae. The species is native to central Africa.

== Geographic range ==
P. bequaerti is found in Cameroon, Central African Republic, Democratic Republic of the Congo, Ethiopia, South Sudan, Sudan, and Uganda.
