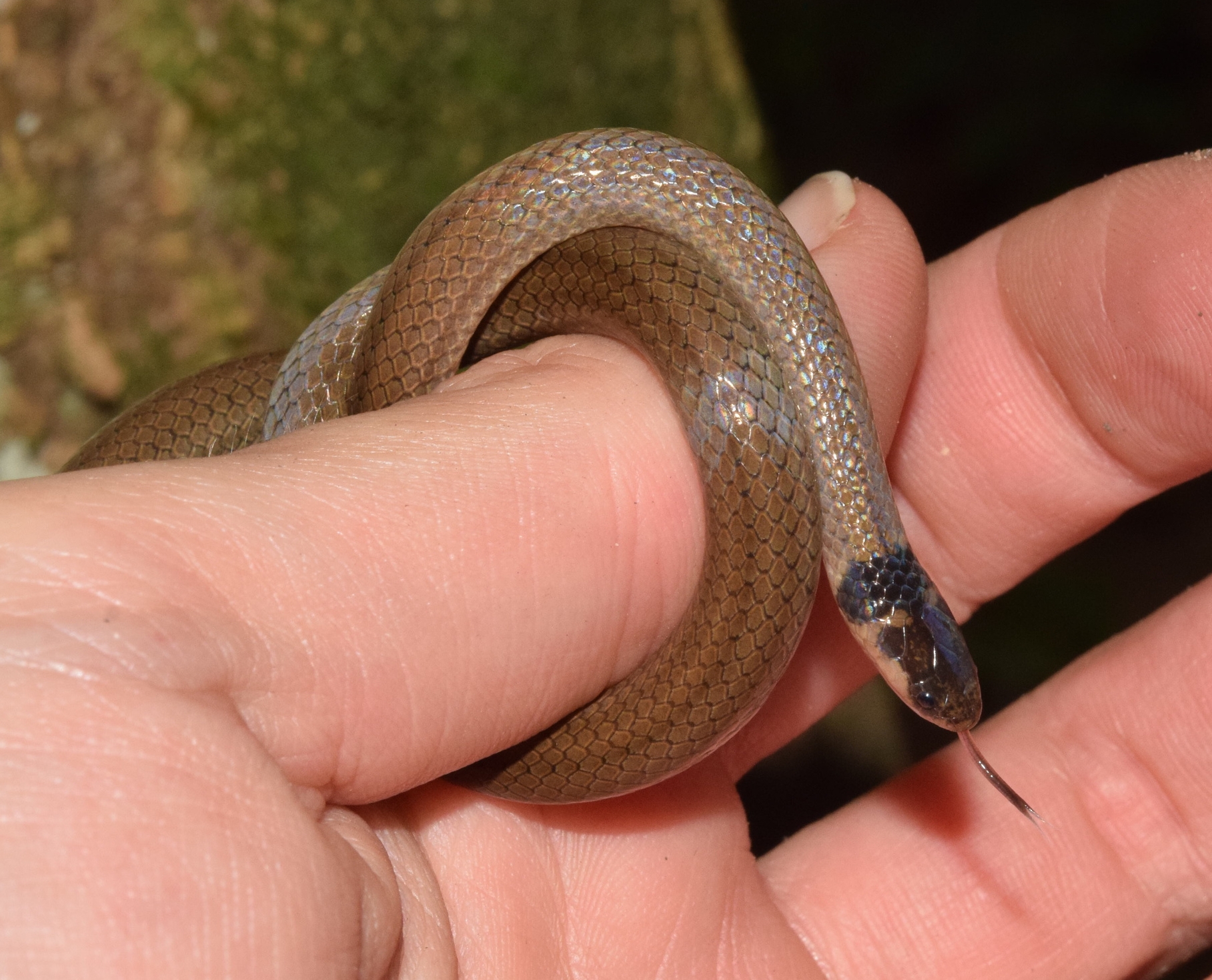

Conservation status
- Least Concern (IUCN 3.1)

Scientific classification
- Kingdom: Animalia
- Phylum: Chordata
- Class: Reptilia
- Order: Squamata
- Suborder: Serpentes
- Family: Atractaspididae
- Genus: Aparallactus
- Species: A. capensis

Binomial name
- Aparallactus capensis A. Smith, 1849

Synonyms
- Aparallactus capensis A. Smith, 1849; Elapomorphus capensis – A. Smith, 1849; Cercocalamus collaris Günther, 1863; Uriechis capensis – Günther, 1865; Aparallactus capensis – Boulenger, 1896

= Aparallactus capensis =

Cape centipede-eater

Species of snake

Aparallactus capensis, or the Cape centipede-eater, is a species of mildly venomous rear-fanged snake in the Atractaspididae family.

== Geographic range ==
It is found in South Africa, Eswatini, Zambia, Botswana, Zimbabwe, Mozambique, and the Democratic Republic of the Congo.

== Description ==
Yellow or pale reddish-brown dorsally, with or without a blackish vertebral line. Yellowish white ventrally. Neck and top of head black, with or without a yellowish crossbar behind the parietals. Sides of head yellowish, with the shields bordering the eye black.

Adults may attain a total length of 33.5 cm (13 1/4 in), with a tail 7 cm (2 3/4 in) long.

A portion of rostral visible from above 1/3 as long as its distance from the frontal. Frontal 1 1/2 to 1 2/3 as long as broad, much longer than its distance from the end of the snout, a little shorter than the parietals. Nasal entire, in contact with the preocular. One postocular. Seven upper labials, third and fourth entering the eye, fifth in contact with the parietal. Mental in contact with the anterior chin shields, which are as long as or a little longer than the posterior. Anterior chin shields in contact with three lower labials.

Dorsal scales in 15 rows, smooth. Ventrals 138–166; anal plate entire; subcaudals 37–53, entire.

It exclusively eats centipedes. It is oviparous (egg-laying), and lays between 2 and 4 eggs in summer. It itself is eaten by other snakes (including garter snakes and stiletto snakes), spiders, scorpions, and centipedes (very rarely).
