= Philothamnus hoplogaster =

Conservation status
- Least Concern (IUCN 3.1)

Scientific classification
- Kingdom: Animalia
- Phylum: Chordata
- Class: Reptilia
- Order: Squamata
- Suborder: Serpentes
- Family: Colubridae
- Genus: Philothamnus
- Species: P. hoplogaster

Binomial name
- Philothamnus hoplogaster (Günther, 1863)

Species of snake

Philothamnus hoplogaster, the southeastern green snake or green water snake, is a species of snake of the family Colubridae.

The snake is found in central Africa.
