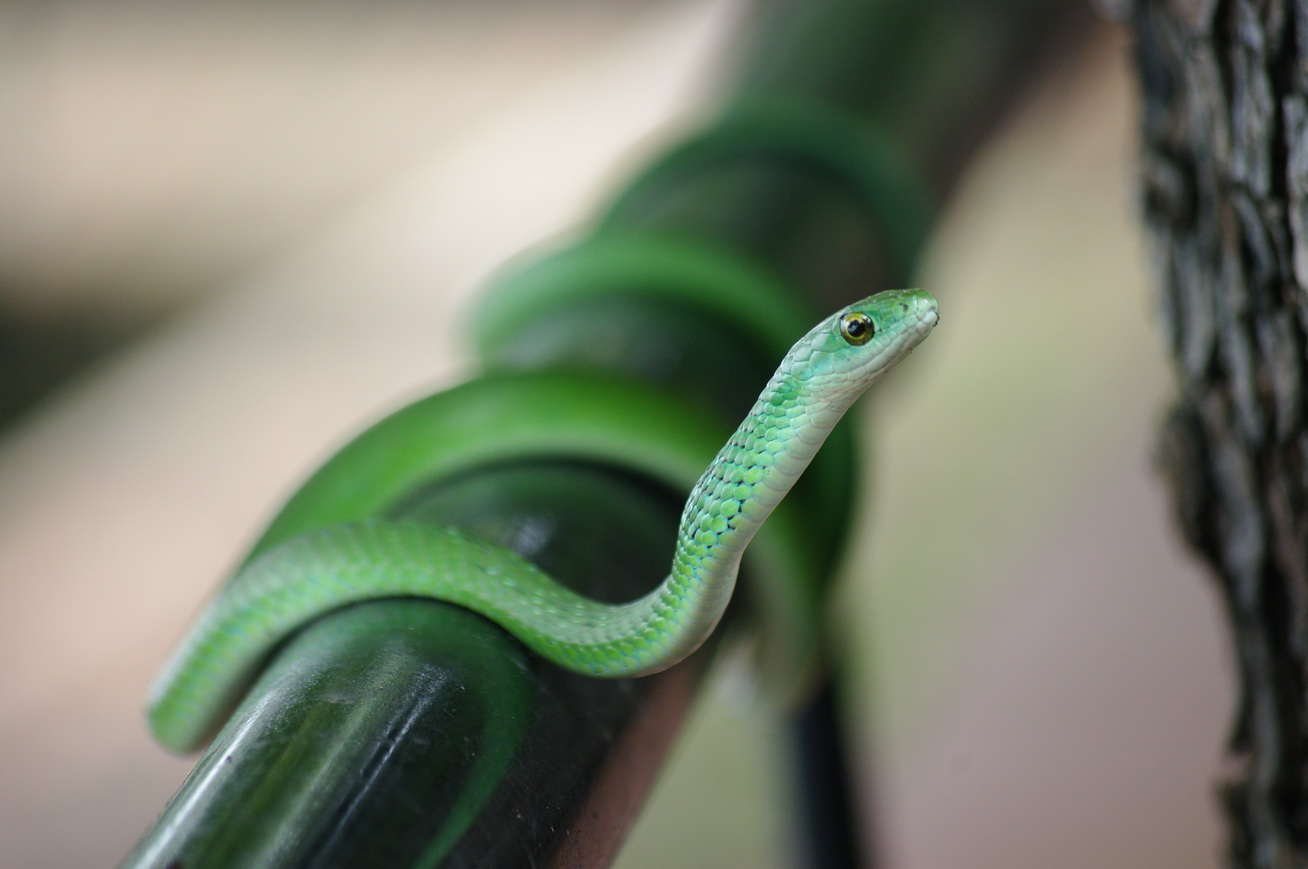

Conservation status
- Least Concern (IUCN 3.1)

Scientific classification
- Kingdom: Animalia
- Phylum: Chordata
- Class: Reptilia
- Order: Squamata
- Suborder: Serpentes
- Family: Colubridae
- Genus: Philothamnus
- Species: P. angolensis

Binomial name
- Philothamnus angolensis Bocage, 1882

= Philothamnus angolensis =

Species of snake

Philothamnus angolensis, the Angola green snake or western green snake, is a species of snake of the family Colubridae.

The snake is found in southern Africa.
