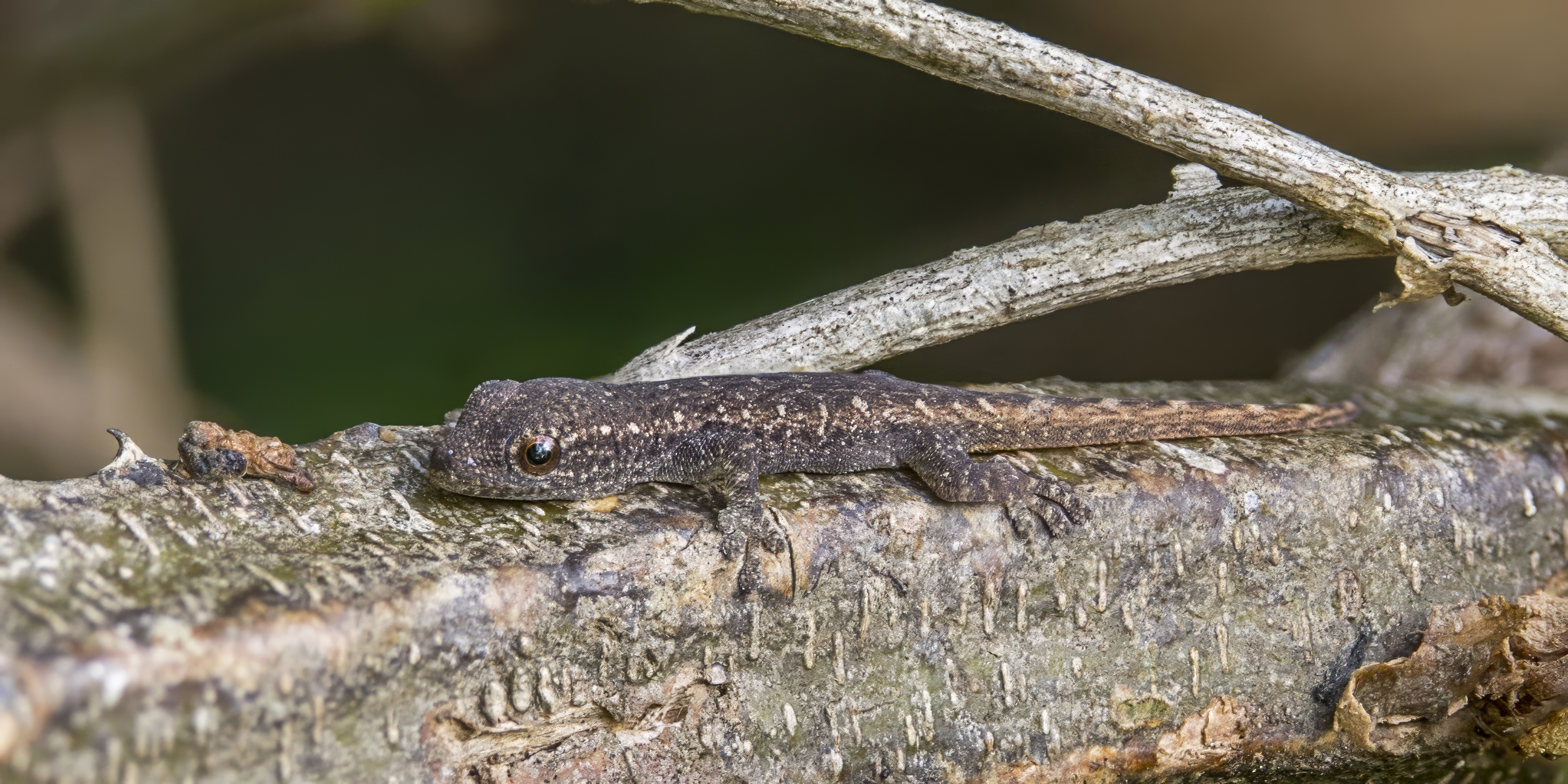

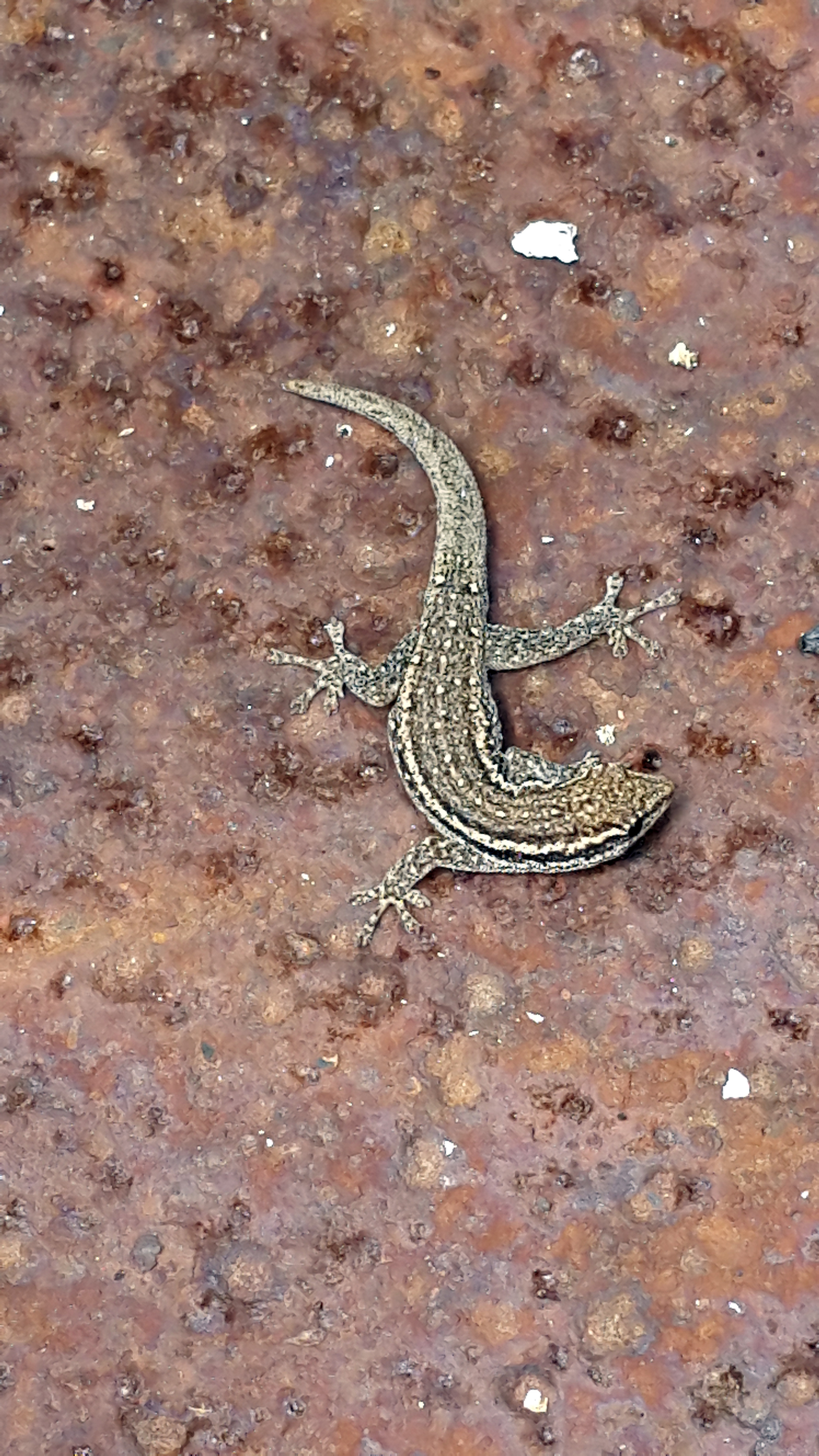

Conservation status
- Least Concern (IUCN 3.1)

Scientific classification
- Kingdom: Animalia
- Phylum: Chordata
- Class: Reptilia
- Order: Squamata
- Suborder: Gekkota
- Family: Gekkonidae
- Genus: Lygodactylus
- Species: L. capensis

Binomial name
- Lygodactylus capensis (Smith, 1849)

Subspecies
- L. c. grotei Sternfeld, 1911; L. c. capensis (Smith, 1849); L. c. pakenhami Loveridge, 1941

Synonyms
- Hemidactylus capensis; Lygodactylus ngamiensis; Lygodactylus strigatus

= Cape dwarf gecko =

Species of lizard

The Cape dwarf gecko (Lygodactylus capensis; 'lygodactylus' = 'flexible fingers') is a species of dwarf gecko found in the woodlands and forests of central and southern Africa. It also occurs commonly in towns and cities and is sometimes kept as a pet.

== Range ==
It occurs in South Africa, Botswana, Eswatini, the Democratic Republic of the Congo, Zambia, Angola, Namibia, Mozambique and Tanzania, including Pemba Island. Its distribution within South Africa has expanded south- and westwards towards the coastal areas since 1981.

== Habits ==
They are often seen on garden walls in towns and cities. When moulting it actively assists the process by detaching skin flakes and consuming them. They have the ability to detach their tails from the rest of their bodies as a mechanism for survival. The high observed frequency of tail loss, coupled with rapid and complete regeneration, suggests that caudal autotomy is an important survival tactic in this species. Although caudal autotomy may allow the Cape dwarf gecko to escape its predator, there have been documented downsides to this survival mechanism. For example, the gecko loses its ability to successfully climb vertical surfaces quickly due to a decrease in balance and adhesion brought about by the loss of its tail, which contains an adhesive pad at the tip of it.

== Description ==
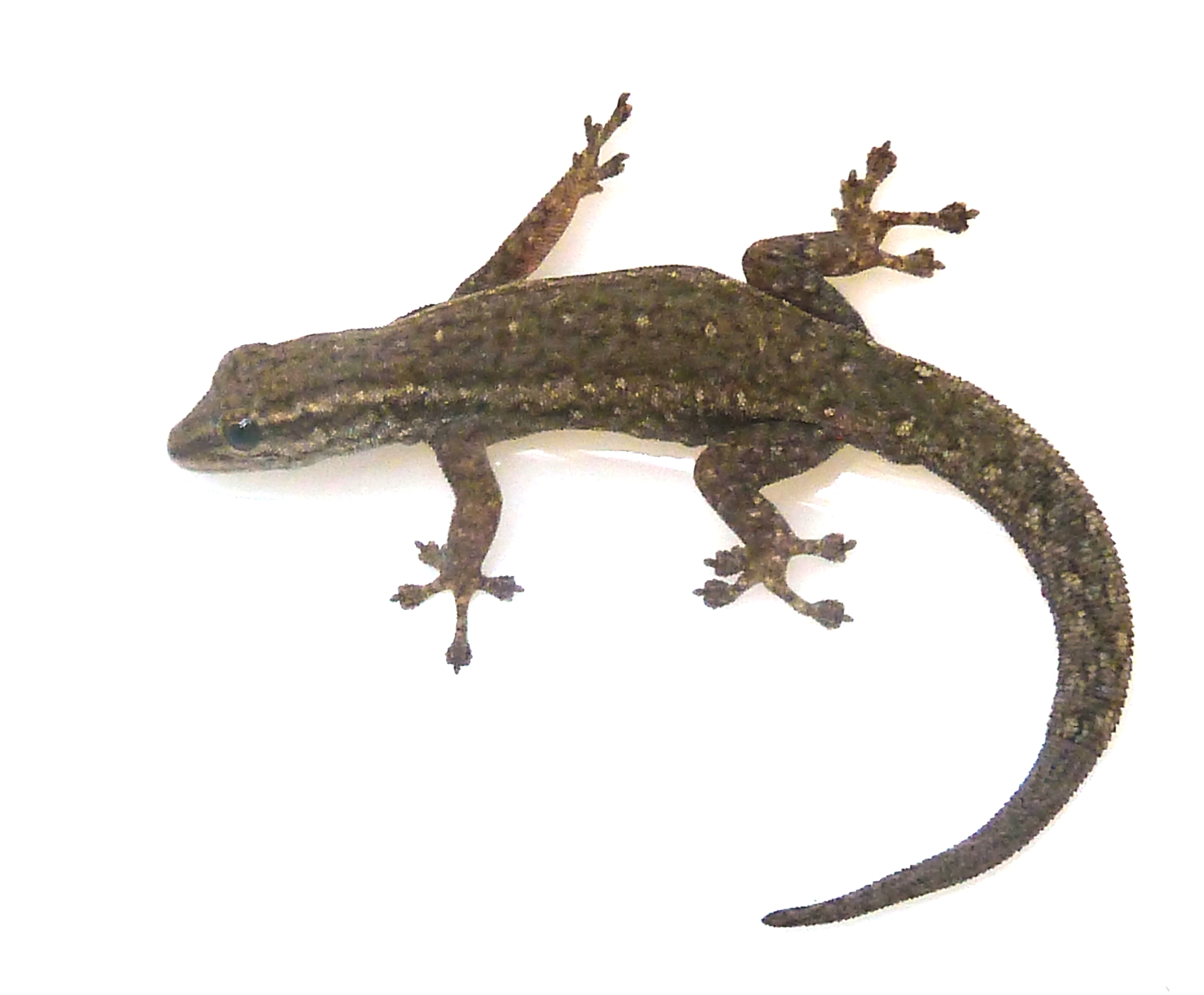
immature

Length (snout to vent length) is 39 mm for males, 43 mm for females. Throat is stippled with grey or brown while the belly is cream coloured. The back is grey-brown with dark streak from snout to shoulder or beyond. Its tail is remarkable for having the underside covered in adhesive lamellae enabling its use as a fifth limb.
