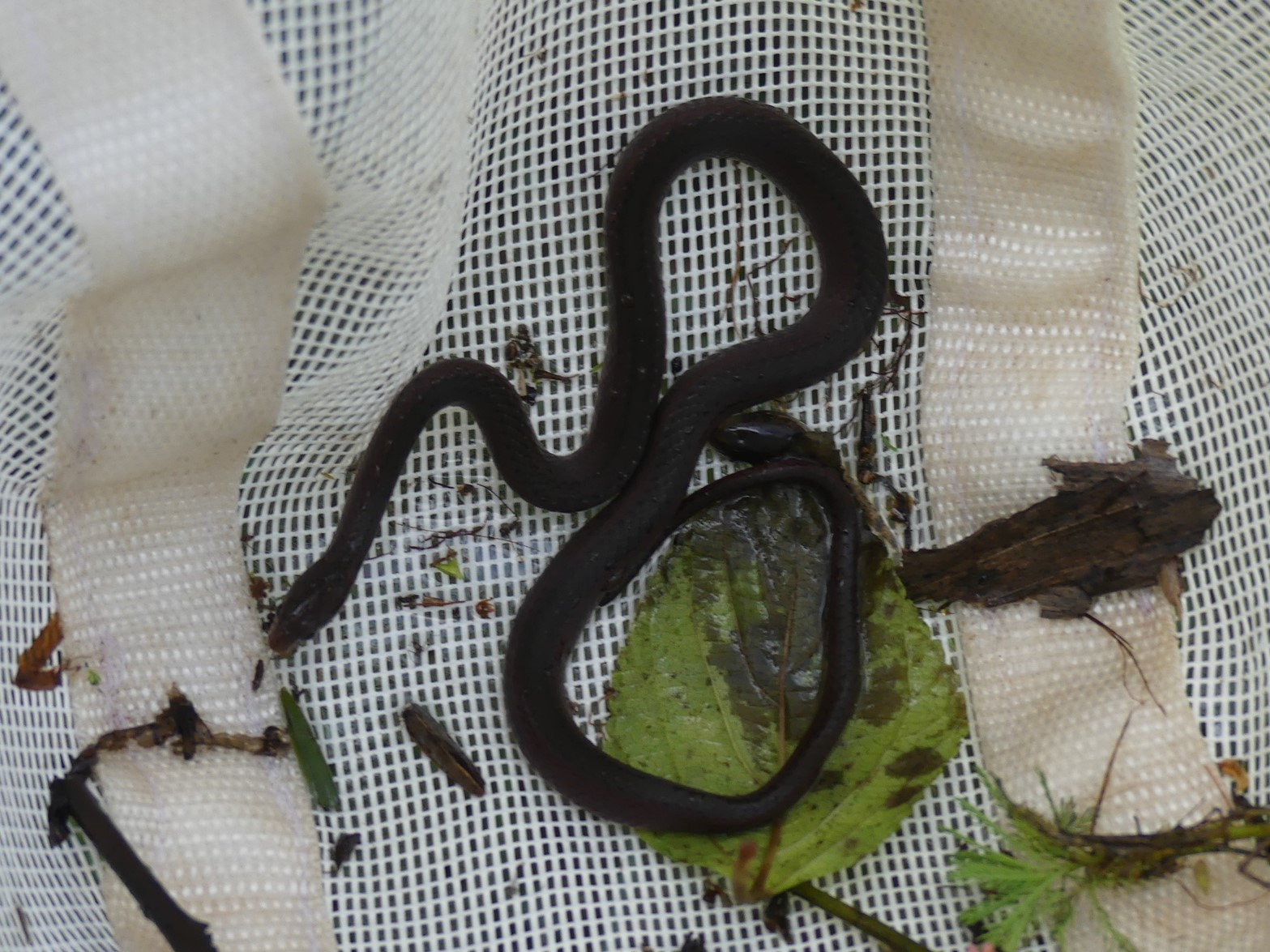

Conservation status
- Least Concern (IUCN 3.1)

Scientific classification
- Kingdom: Animalia
- Phylum: Chordata
- Class: Reptilia
- Order: Squamata
- Suborder: Serpentes
- Family: Colubridae
- Genus: Natriciteres
- Species: N. olivacea

Binomial name
- Natriciteres olivacea (W. Peters, 1854)

Synonyms
- Coronella olivacea W. Peters, 1854; Zacholus olivaceus — Rochebrune, 1884; Tropidonotus olivaceus — Boulenger, 1893; Mizodon olivaceus — Bocage, 1895; Natrix olivaceus — Schmidt, 1923; Neusterophis olivaceus — Loveridge, 1951; Natriciteres olivacea — Loveridge, 1953

= Olive marsh snake =

Species of snake

The olive marsh snake (Natriciteres olivacea) is a species of snake in the subfamily Natricinae of the family Colubridae. The species is endemic to Sub-Saharan Africa.

== Description ==
N. olivacea is a small snake which exhibits sexual dimorphism. Males may attain a maximum total length (including tail) of only 27 cm (11 in), but the larger females may attain a total length of 33 cm (13 in).

It has smooth dorsal scales, which are arranged in 19 rows at midbody, reducing to 17 rows towards the rear.

Dorsally, it is dark olive. Ventrally, it is whitish. The upper labials are whitish, with dark vertical bars at the sutures.

== Distribution and habitat ==
N. olivacea is found in Angola, Benin, Botswana, Cameroon, Central African Republic, both Congos (Democratic Republic of the Congo and Republic of the Congo), Equatorial Guinea, Ethiopia, Gabon, Ghana, Guinea, Ivory Coast, Mali, Mozambique, Namibia, Nigeria, Senegal, Somalia, South Africa, Sudan, Tanzania, Togo, Uganda, Zambia, and Zimbabwe.

The preferred habitat of N. olivacea is savanna.

== Biology ==
N. olivacea is oviparous. In early summer the adult female lays a clutch of 6-8 eggs. Each egg measures 22 x 9 mm (.87 x .35 inch). It preys on winged termites.
