= Natriciteres fuliginoides =

Conservation status
- Least Concern (IUCN 3.1)

Scientific classification
- Kingdom: Animalia
- Phylum: Chordata
- Class: Reptilia
- Order: Squamata
- Suborder: Serpentes
- Family: Colubridae
- Genus: Natriciteres
- Species: N. fuliginoides

Binomial name
- Natriciteres fuliginoides (Günther, 1858)

Species of snake

Natriciteres fuliginoides, the collared marsh snake, is a species of natricine snake found in Guinea, Ghana, Togo, Nigeria, Cameroon, Central African Republic, Democratic Republic of the Congo, Republic of the Congo, Gabon, Sierra Leone, and Liberia.
