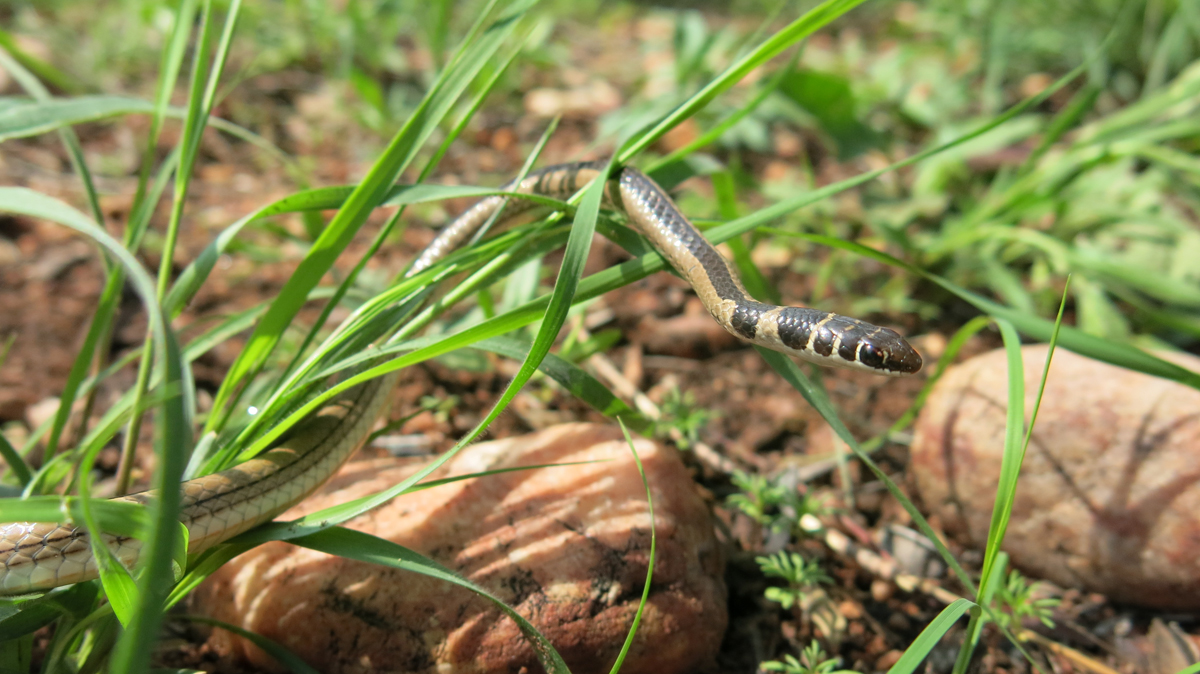
- Psammophis angolensis, Limpopo, South Africa

Scientific classification
- Kingdom: Animalia
- Phylum: Chordata
- Class: Reptilia
- Order: Squamata
- Suborder: Serpentes
- Family: Psammophiidae
- Genus: Psammophis
- Species: P. angolensis

Binomial name
- Psammophis angolensis (Bocage, 1872)

Synonyms
- Amphiophis angolensis Bocage, 1872

= Psammophis angolensis =

Species of snake

Psammophis angolensis, sometimes known as the dwarf sand snake, is a species of snake in the family Psammophiidae reaching a maximum length of 50 cm, but averaging 30 cm. The snake actively forages for lizards and frogs.

The species is widespread in sub-Saharan Africa, ranging from Tanzania and the Democratic Republic of the Congo, through Zambia, Malawi, Mozambique, westwards to Angola and southwards through Zimbabwe to South Africa.
