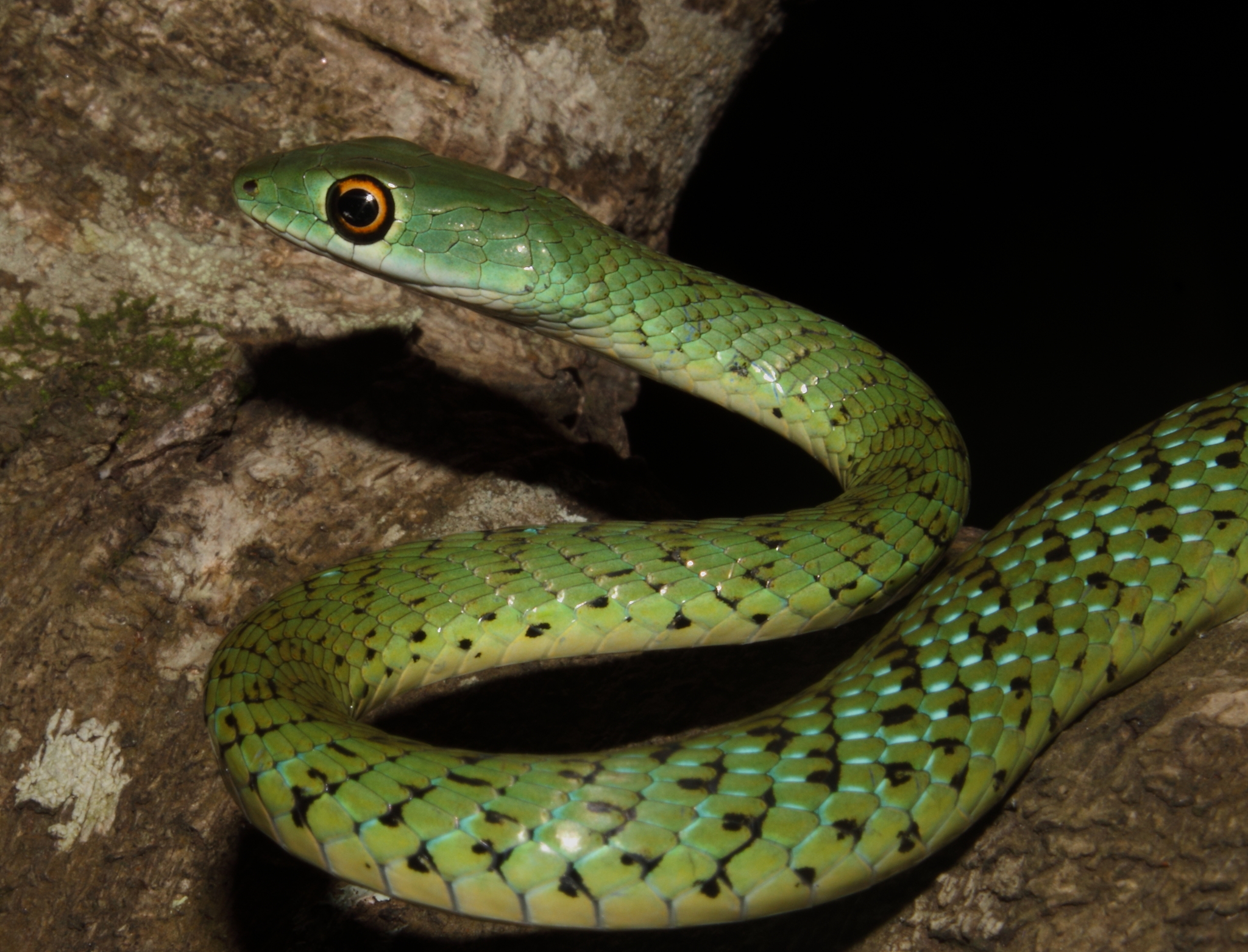

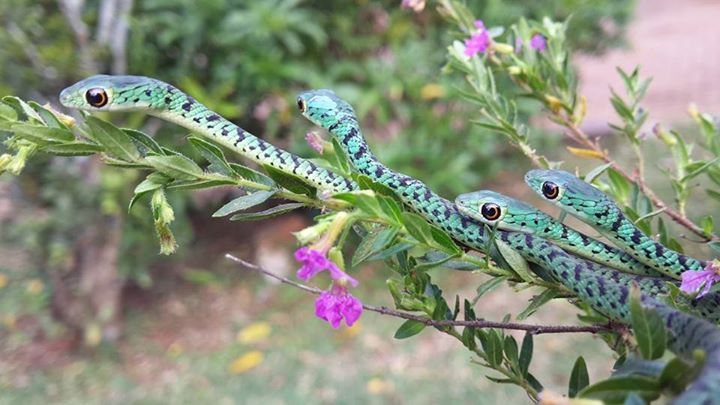
- In South Africa. Adult (top), hatchlings (bottom)

Conservation status
- Least Concern (IUCN 3.1)

Scientific classification
- Kingdom: Animalia
- Phylum: Chordata
- Class: Reptilia
- Order: Squamata
- Suborder: Serpentes
- Family: Colubridae
- Genus: Philothamnus
- Species: P. semivariegatus

Binomial name
- Philothamnus semivariegatus (A. Smith, 1840)

Synonyms
- Dendrophis (Philothamnus) semivariegata A. Smith, 1840; Ahætulla semivariegata — Günther, 1863; Philothamnus semivariegatus — Boulenger, 1894

= Philothamnus semivariegatus =

Species of snake

Philothamnus semivariegatus, commonly known as the spotted bush snake is a species of non-venomous colubrid snake, endemic to Africa.

== Geographic range ==
P. semivariegatus is distributed from South Africa northward to Sudan, Uganda and from Guinea eastward to Tanzania and sighted in Nigeria.

== Description ==
The colour is bright green with black speckles. Average snout to vent length (SVL) is 60–90 cm (24–35 in).

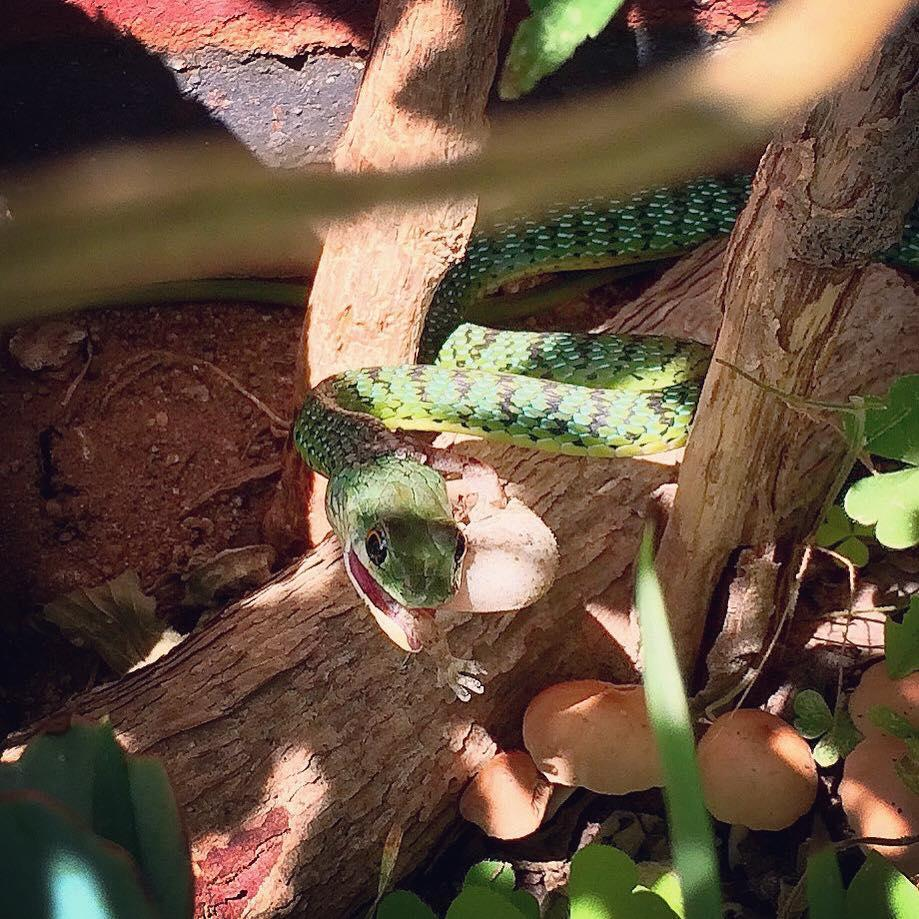
Eating a tropical house gecko.

== Biology ==
Spotted bush snakes are mostly found in trees in bush and forest areas, where they hunt lizards and treefrogs. They are also known to devour chameleons and dwarfs. They are excellent climbers and swimmers, have very good eyesight, and are highly alert snakes. They are not territorial, and will roam great distances in search for food. Spotted bush snakes are very common and completely harmless. They are well camouflaged, naturally very nervous, and quick to escape from any potential threat. As such, suburban sightings are rare.

== In captivity ==
They can be very difficult to keep in captivity, being very nervous and reluctant to feed on anything but sympatric gecko species, but they are occasionally kept and bred successfully.

== Reproduction ==
Females can lay between 3 and 12 elongate eggs every summer, and each hatchling is about 25 cm (9.8 in) in total length (including tail).
