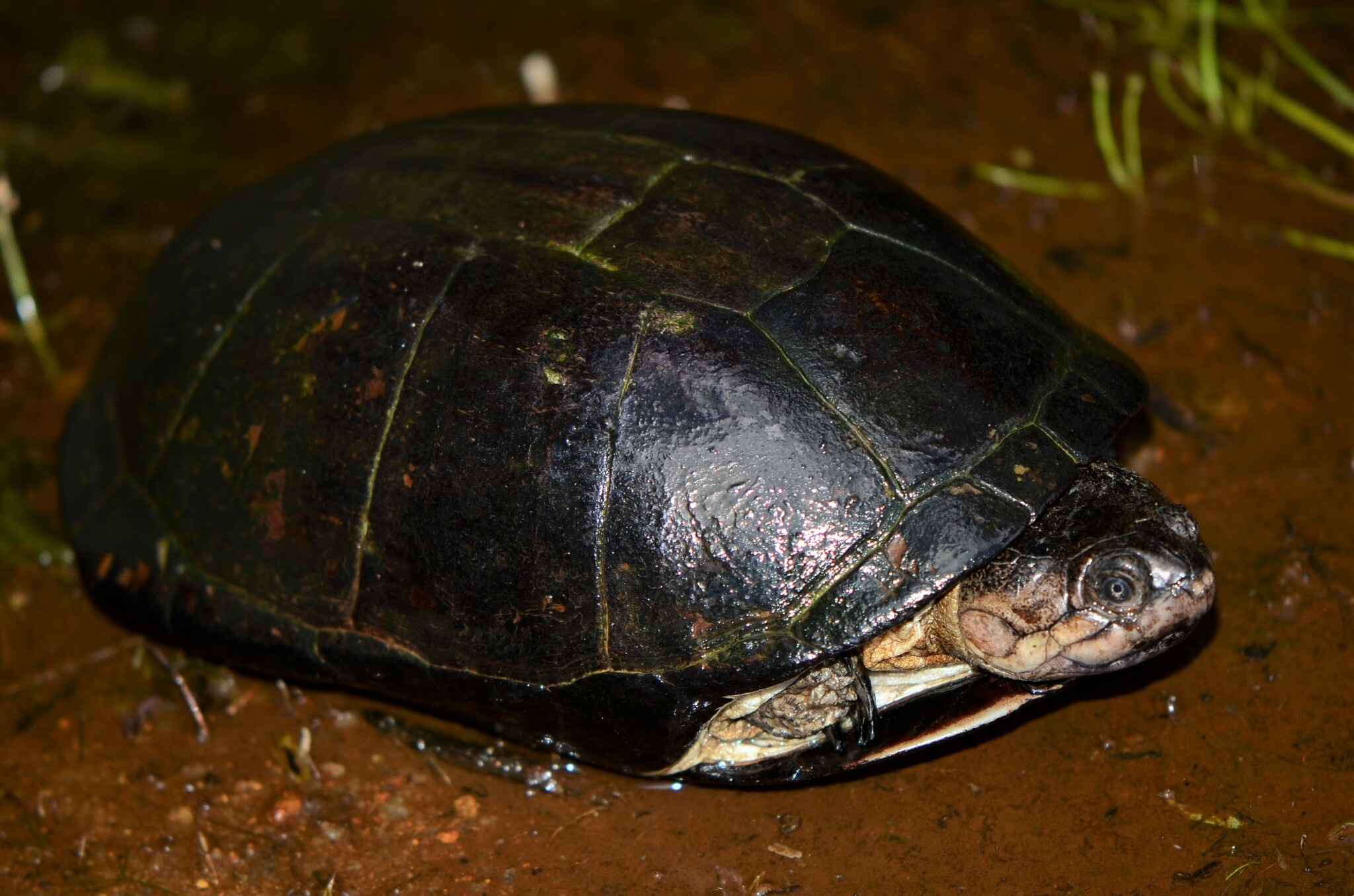

Conservation status
- Critically Endangered (IUCN 3.1)

Scientific classification
- Kingdom: Animalia
- Phylum: Chordata
- Class: Reptilia
- Order: Testudines
- Suborder: Pleurodira
- Family: Pelomedusidae
- Genus: Pelusios
- Species: P. castanoides
- Subspecies: P. c. intergularis

Trinomial name
- Pelusios castanoides intergularis Bour, 1983

= Seychelles yellow-bellied mud turtle =

Subspecies of turtle

The Seychelles yellow-bellied mud turtle (Pelusios castanoides intergularis) is a critically endangered subspecies of the yellow-bellied mud turtle (Pelusios castanoides). It is endemic to the Seychelles.

== Description ==
The Seychelles yellow-bellied mud turtle has an elongated carapace that is wider at the rear than at the front. The vertebral scutes are usually smooth, although juveniles may show a low ridge. The shell margins are not serrated. Its coloration is typically light yellow-brown with darker spots, but it may appear darker in marshy environments or fade to pale white in older individuals or acidic habitats.

The plastron is yellow and proportionally longer at the front, with a sharply angled anal notch. In females, the notch is rounded, while in males it is straighter, and the male plastron may be slightly concave.

The head is yellow with dark, irregular markings. A scale near the upper lip may be reduced or absent. The front limbs are partly covered with 4–6 curved, sickle-shaped scales. The internal shell bones form a complete series toward the front.

Females are larger than males, reaching up to 235 mm in shell length, while males reach up to 194 mm.

Hatchlings differ in appearance, with mostly black shells marked by yellow patches, a dark plastron with yellow markings, and gray skin. Their heads also show dark markings and yellow patches on certain scales.

== Distribution ==
The Seychelles yellow-bellied mud turtle is endemic to Seychelles, located in the Indian Ocean. The species is found on six islands, Mahé, Cerf, Silhouette, Praslin, La Digue, and Frégate island.

== Threats ==
The species is threatened by habitat loss and degradation, particularly through the drainage of wetlands and canalization, which limits access to suitable nesting areas. The species is also negatively affected by invasive plants such as water hyacinth and water lettuce

Additional threats may include predation, with domestic dogs potentially preying on adults, and cats and Tailless tenrecs impacting juveniles and eggs. Historically, the species were collected for human consumption and the curio trade; however, both of these practices ended approximately 30–40 years ago.

== Conservation ==
The Seychelles yellow-bellied mud turtle is protected under the 1966 Wild Animals Protection Regulations under Seychelles law, which prohibits their capture. The subspecies is also listed as critically endangered by the IUCN.

The subspecies occurs in several protected areas across the Seychelles, including the La Vev Reserve on La Digue and the Port Launay Ramsar Site on Mahé, where a small relict population persists. Conservation efforts by the Nature Protection Trust of Seychelles, through the Seychelles Terrapin Conservation Project, include monitoring, research, and captive breeding.

=== Captive breeding ===
Captive breeding of the subspecies started in 2004, however it has seen limited success. Between 2004 and 2008, only three hatched. This may be due to high hatchling mortality, reaching over 70%.
