= Black turtle =

Black turtle may refer to:

- Black Tortoise, the Chinese constellations and Chinese astronomical sign
- Green sea turtle, a sea turtle also known as the black turtle or black sea turtle
- Indian black turtle, a species of turtle found in South Asia
- West African black turtle, a species of turtle in the family Pelomedusidae, endemic to Africa
- Black river turtle, a species of turtle found in Costa Rica, Honduras, Nicaragua, and Panama
- Black softshell turtle, a species of freshwater turtle found in India (Assam) and Bangladesh (Chittagong).
- Black pond turtle, a species of turtle found in South Asia
- Black turtle bean, common variety of bean
- Black Turtle Cove, a mangrove estuary on the northern shores of Santa Cruz Island in Ecuador's Galapagos Islands
- Black turtle Goalie, Hockey goalie that's lying on his back 95 % of the time

== See also ==
- Black terrapin (disambiguation)
- Black mud turtle (disambiguation)
