= Ivory Coast mud turtle =

Conservation status
- Not evaluated (IUCN 3.1)

Scientific classification
- Kingdom: Animalia
- Phylum: Chordata
- Class: Reptilia
- Order: Testudines
- Suborder: Pleurodira
- Family: Pelomedusidae
- Genus: Pelusios
- Species: P. cupulatta

Binomial name
- Pelusios cupulatta Bour and Maran, 2003

Synonyms
- None

Species of turtle

The Ivory Coast mud turtle (Pelusios cupulatta) is a species of turtle in the family Pelomedusidae. It is one of the most recently described turtle species.

Pelusios cupulatta is typically found in riverine and wetland habitats mainly located in the southern Ivory Coast of West Africa. Endemic to the Upper Guinean forest region such as wetlands/rivers they are usually found primarily in forested banks as well as aquatic vegetation. Compared to other counterparts within its family, P. Cupulatta prefers an abundance of aquatic vegetation as its primary habitat. Despite this, Pelusios castaneus is a potential competitor due to similar habitats albeit different preferences regarding specific locations. Interspecific competition is able to regulate the coexistence of potential competitors but also niche expansion is available within the family when alone.

Comparative to other species at a local spatial level, Pelusios niger and Pelusios cupulatta both belong to larger size categories compared to others within the Pelusios' records with the maximum male SCL being 31.3 and the maximum female SCL being 27.1. The two different turtle species are also allopatric, meaning that they are related but occur in separate non-overlapping geographical areas compared to the sympatric of P. castaneus. White P. castaneus intensely uses forested banks, and P. cupulatta are not typically found in such areas as they aim for places with large amounts of aquatic vegetation. In presence of P. niger, P. cupulatta are usually found less than 10 km away showing how closely these two groups typically reside at roughly close locations.

It is found in Sierra Leone, Liberia, Côte d'Ivoire (Ivory Coast), Ghana, Togo and Benin.

== Bibliography ==
- Rhodin, Anders G.J.; van Dijk, Peter Paul; Iverson, John B.; Shaffer, H. Bradley; Roger, Bour (2011-12-31). "Turtles of the world, 2011 update: Annotated checklist of taxonomy, synonymy, distribution and conservation status" (PDF). Chelonian Research Monographs. 6. Archived from the original (PDF) on 2012-01-31.
- Fritz, Uwe; Havaš, Peter (2007-10-31). "Checklist of Chelonians of the World" (PDF). Archived from the original (PDF) on 2011-05-01.
