= Black mud turtle =

Black mud turtle may refer to:

- East African black mud turtle (Pelusios subniger), a pelomedusid turtle found East Africa.
- Seychelles black terrapin (Pelusios seychellensis), a recently extinct pelomedusid turtle that was once endemic to Seychelles.
- Black marsh turtle (Siebenrockiella crassicollis), a geoemydid turtle found in Southeast Asia.

== See also ==
- Black terrapin (disambiguation)
- Mud turtles
- Pelusios
