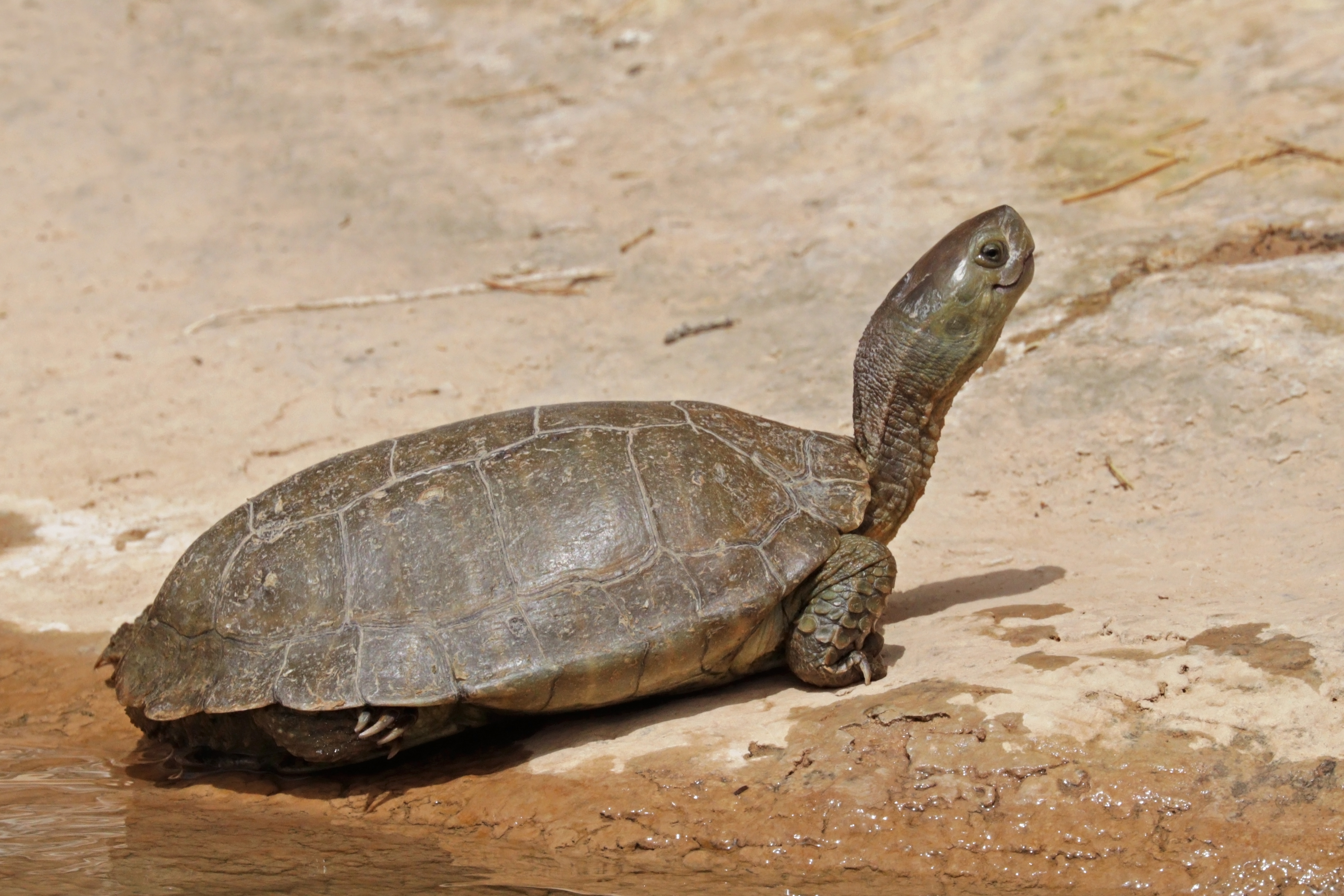
- Female M. l. saharica in Morocco

Conservation status
- Vulnerable (IUCN 3.1)

Scientific classification
- Kingdom: Animalia
- Phylum: Chordata
- Class: Reptilia
- Order: Testudines
- Suborder: Cryptodira
- Family: Geoemydidae
- Genus: Mauremys
- Species: M. leprosa

Binomial name
- Mauremys leprosa Schweigger, 1812
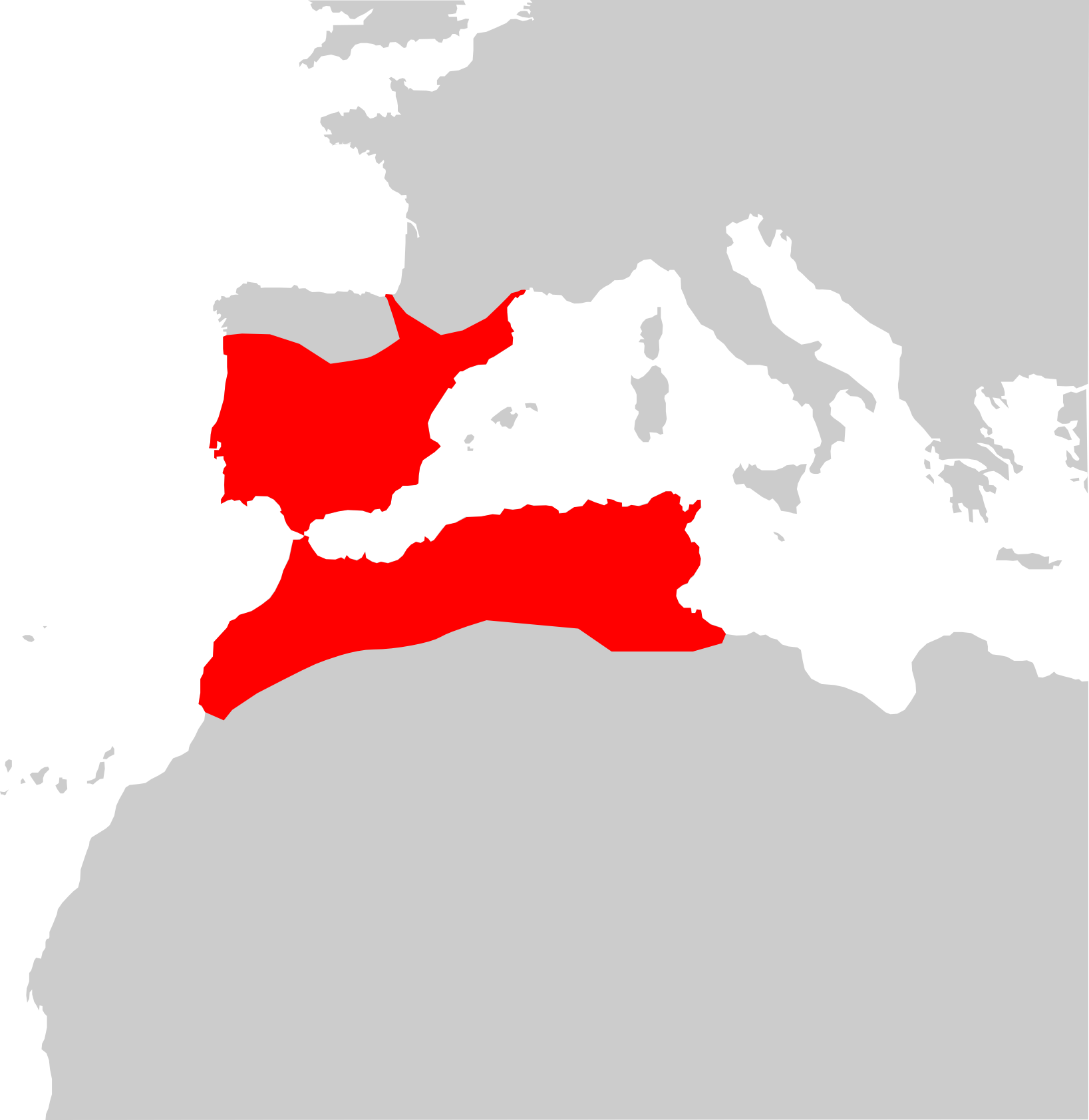

Synonyms
- List: Emys leprosa Schweigger, 1812; Emys lutescens Schweigger, 1812; Emys marmorea Spix, 1824; Clemmys sigriz Michahelles, 1829; Emys vulgaris Gray, 1831; Emys sigritzii Gray, 1831 (ex errore); Terrapene sigriz — Bonaparte, 1832; Emys sigriz — A.M.C. Duméril & Bibron, 1835; Clemmys (Clemmys) leprosa — Fitzinger, 1835; Clemmys (Clemmys) lutescens — Fitzinger, 1835; Emys laticeps Gray, 1854; Emys fuliginosus Gray, 1860; Clemmys fuliginosa — Strauch, 1862; Clemmys laticeps — Strauch, 1862; Clemmys marmorea — Strauch, 1862; Emys flavipes Gray, 1869; Emys fraseri Gray, 1869; Mauremys fuliginosa — Gray, 1869; Mauremys laniaria Gray, 1869; Emys laniaria — Gray, 1870; Eryma laticeps — Gray, 1870; Emys lamaria Gray, 1873 (ex errore); Emys caspica var. leprosa — Boettger, 1874; Clemmys caspica sigriz — Bedriaga, 1882; Clemmys caspica leprosa — Bedriaga, 1890; Mauremys caspica leprosa — Młynarski, 1969; Mauremys leprosa — Bour, 1978; Mauremys leprosa atlantica Schleich, 1996; Mauremys leprosa erhardi Schleich, 1996; Mauremys leprosa marokkensis Schleich, 1996; Mauremys leprosa wernerkaestlei Schleich, 1996; Mauremys leprosa leprosa — McCord, 1997; Mauremys leprosa erhardii — Fritz, Barata, Busack, Fritzsch & Castilho, 2006 (ex errore) Mauremys leprosa saharica; Emys fraseri Gray, 1869 (partim, nomen dubium); Mauremys leprosa saharica Schleich, 1996; Mauremys leprosa zizi Schleich, 1996; Mauremys leprosa vanmeerhaeghei Bour & Maran, 1999; Mauremys leprosa vanmerhaeghei Bour & Maran, 1999 (ex errore); Mauremys leprosa vanmeerhaghei Fritz, Fritzsch, Lehr, Ducotterd & A. Müller, 2005 (ex errore)

= Iberian pond turtle =

Species of turtle

The Iberian pond turtle (Mauremys leprosa), also known as the Mediterranean pond turtle or Mediterranean turtle, is a species of turtle in the family Geoemydidae. The species is endemic to southwestern Europe and northwestern Africa.

== Subspecies ==
Including the nominotypical subspecies, there are two sub-species which are accepted:

- M. leprosa leprosa (Schweigger, 1812) – Iberian pond turtle
- M. leprosa saharica Schleich, 1996 – Saharan pond turtle

== Gallery ==
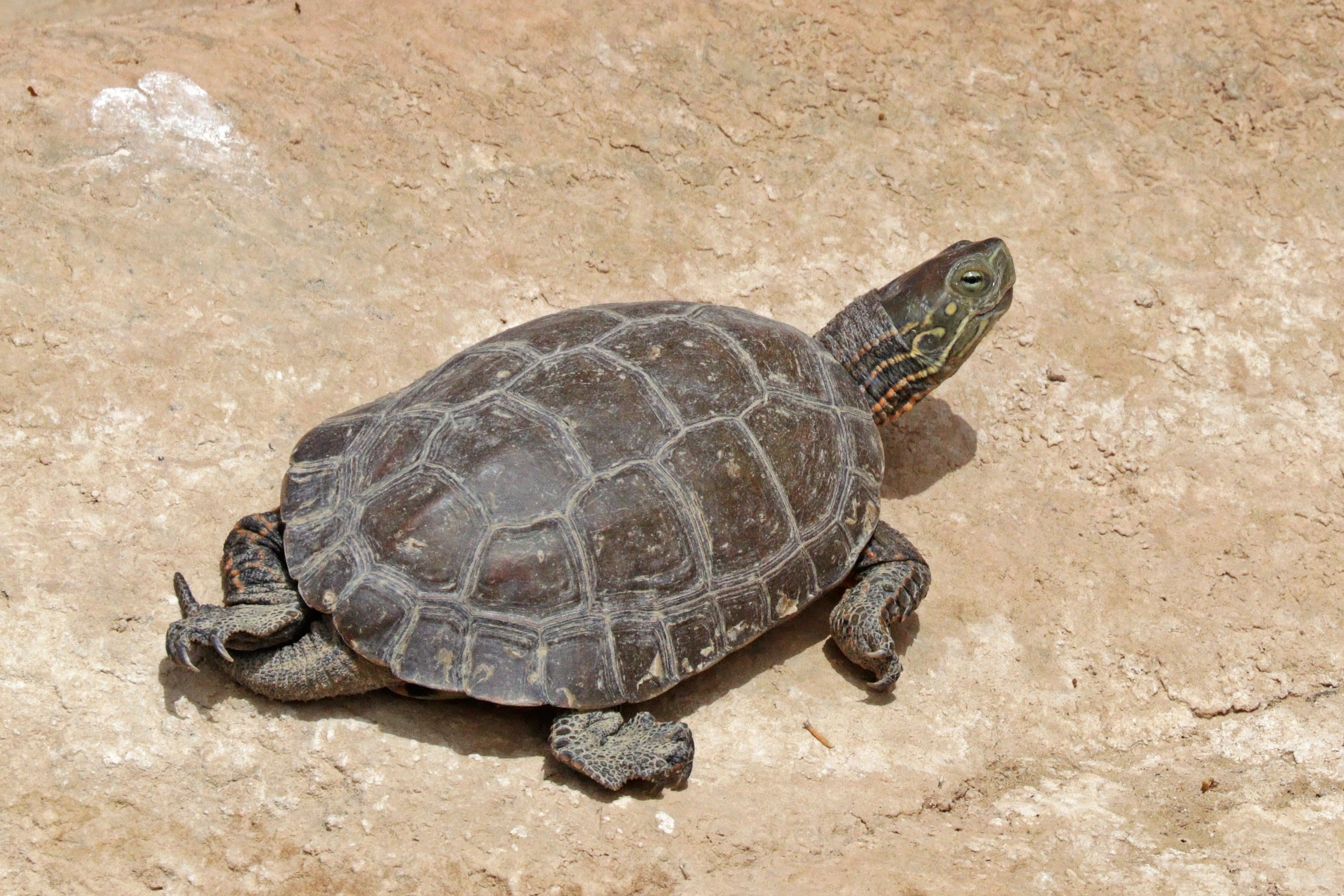
male M. l. saharica, Morocco

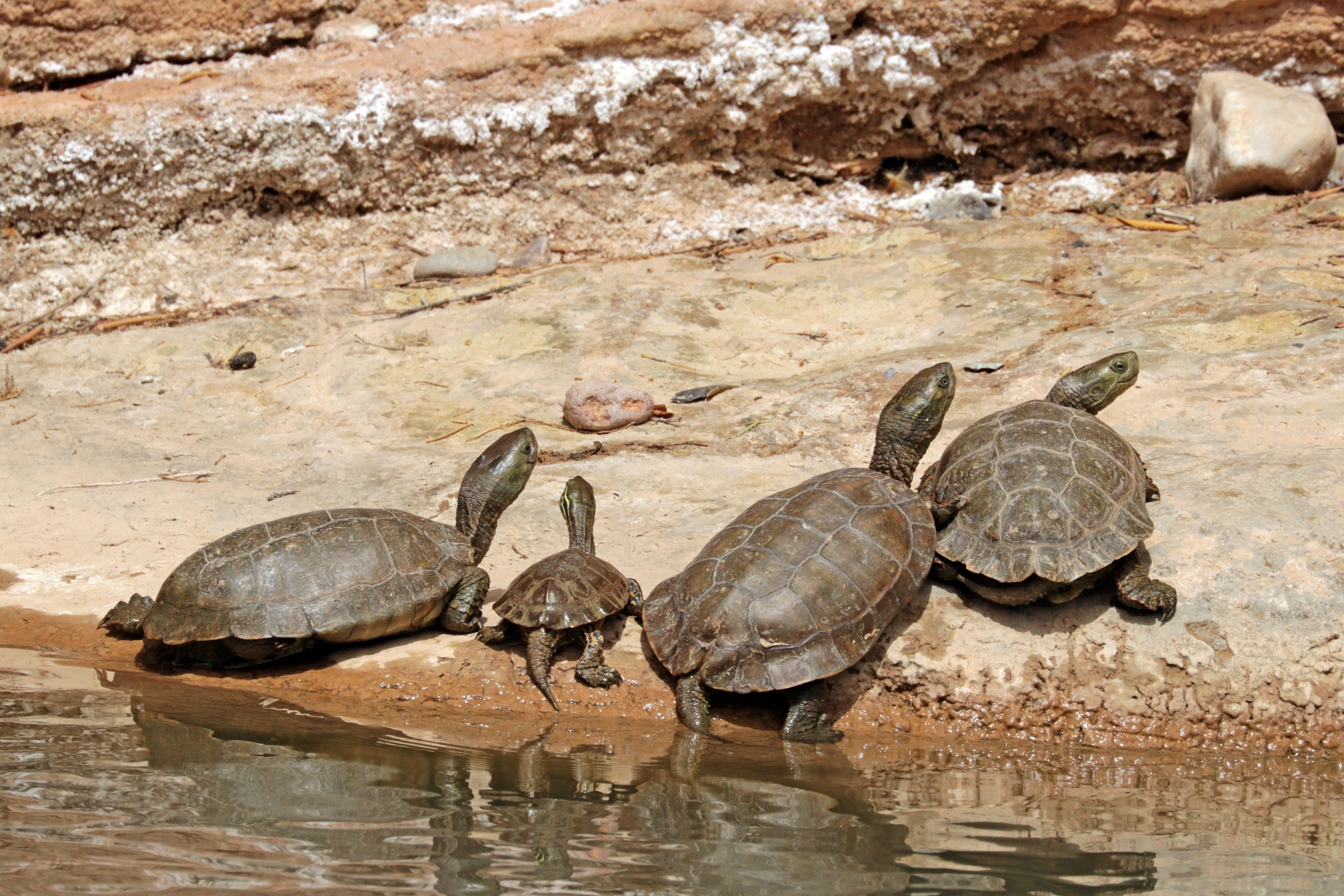
adults and juvenile M. l. saharica, Morocco

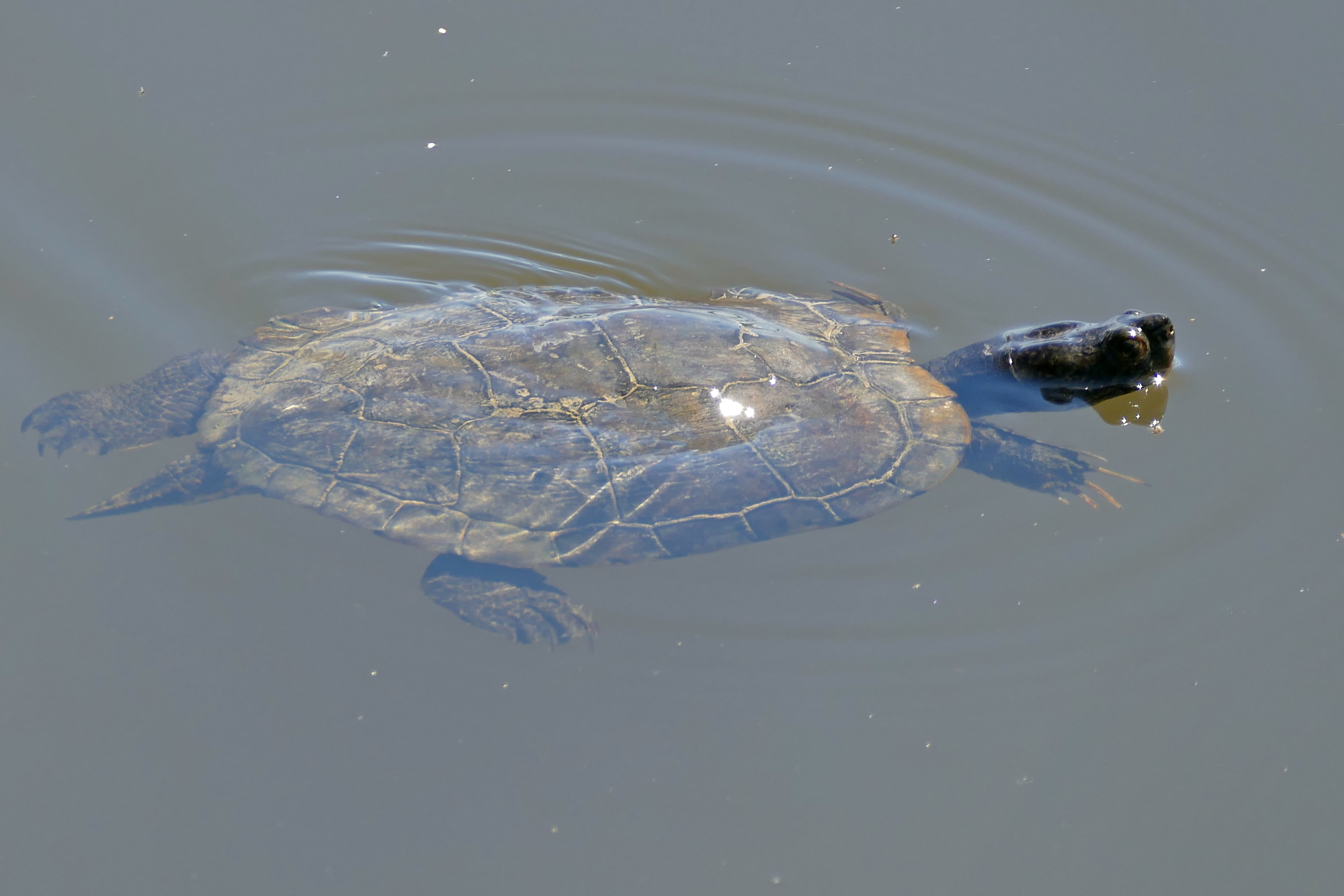
swimming

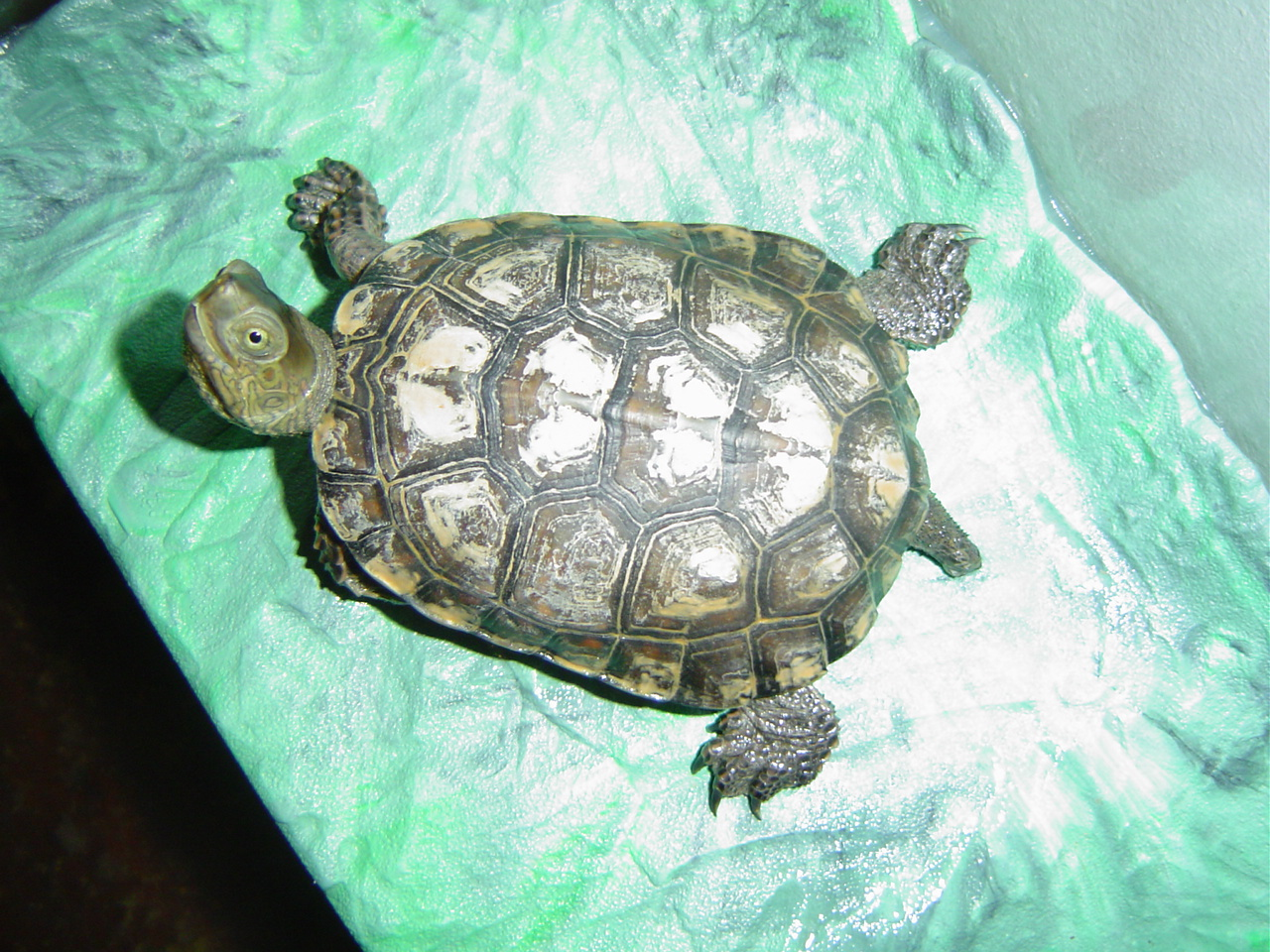
Juvenile

== Distribution ==
Mauremys leprosa is native to the western mainland Mediterranean Basin, stretching from the tip of southern France to the northwestern Maghreb (in Morocco, Algeria, Tunisia and Libya). It is most frequent in the southern half of the Iberian Peninsula (Portugal and Spain).

== Bibliography ==
- Rhodin, Anders G.J.; van Dijk, Peter Paul; Iverson, John B.; Shaffer, H. Bradley (2010-12-14). "Turtles of the World 2010 Update: Annotated Checklist of Taxonomy, Synonymy, Distribution and Conservation Status" (PDF). Archived from the original (PDF) on 2011-07-17.
