= Variable mud turtle =

Conservation status
- Least Concern (IUCN 2.3)

Scientific classification
- Kingdom: Animalia
- Phylum: Chordata
- Class: Reptilia
- Order: Testudines
- Suborder: Pleurodira
- Family: Pelomedusidae
- Genus: Pelusios
- Species: P. rhodesianus

Binomial name
- Pelusios rhodesianus Hewitt, 1927

Synonyms
- Pelusios nigricans rhodesianus Hewitt, 1927

Species of turtle

The variable mud turtle (Pelusios rhodesianus), also known as Rhodesian mud turtle, Mashona hinged terrapin or variable hinged terrapin, is a species of turtle in the family Pelomedusidae. It is widely distributed in Central, East, and Southern Africa. The species was officially described by John Hewitt in 1927 and had to be broken into subspecies due to color variations on the heads of the turtles acrost the regions.

== Distribution ==
This species is found in the Republic of the Congo, the Democratic Republic of the Congo, Uganda, Rwanda, Burundi, Tanzania, Angola, Zambia, Malawi, Zimbabwe, Botswana, Mozambique, and South Africa. The variable mud turtle can generally be found in or around water sources or areas such as lagoons or swampy areas.

== Conservation status ==
The variable mud turtle (Pelusios rhodesianus) is currently listed as of least concern by conservationists, but a reduction in population has been noticed between the variable mud turtle and species in the same family. As it would turn out, destruction of water sources (such as damming) has caused an impact on this family of turtles. One of these species (Pelusios seychellensis) has actually recently become extinct for these same reasons. This family along with the family Pelomedusa are actually the last two surviving families of an even larger group of turtles called the Pelomedusoides.

== Facts ==
- All of the species in this family are very aquatic.
- "A hinge between hypoplastral and mesoplastral bones allows a more or less complete closure of the anterior part of the shell."
- You can often find these turtles with burn marks on the shells caused from brush fires.
