= Black terrapin =

Black terrapin may refer to:

- Seychelles black terrapin (Pelusios seychellensis), a recently extinct pelomedusid turtle that was once endemic to Seychelles.
- Black river turtle (Rhinoclemmys funerea), a geoemydid turtle found in Central America.
- Black marsh turtle (Siebenrockiella crassicollis), a geoemydid turtle found in Southeast Asia.

== See also ==
- Pelusios
- Black mud turtle (disambiguation)
