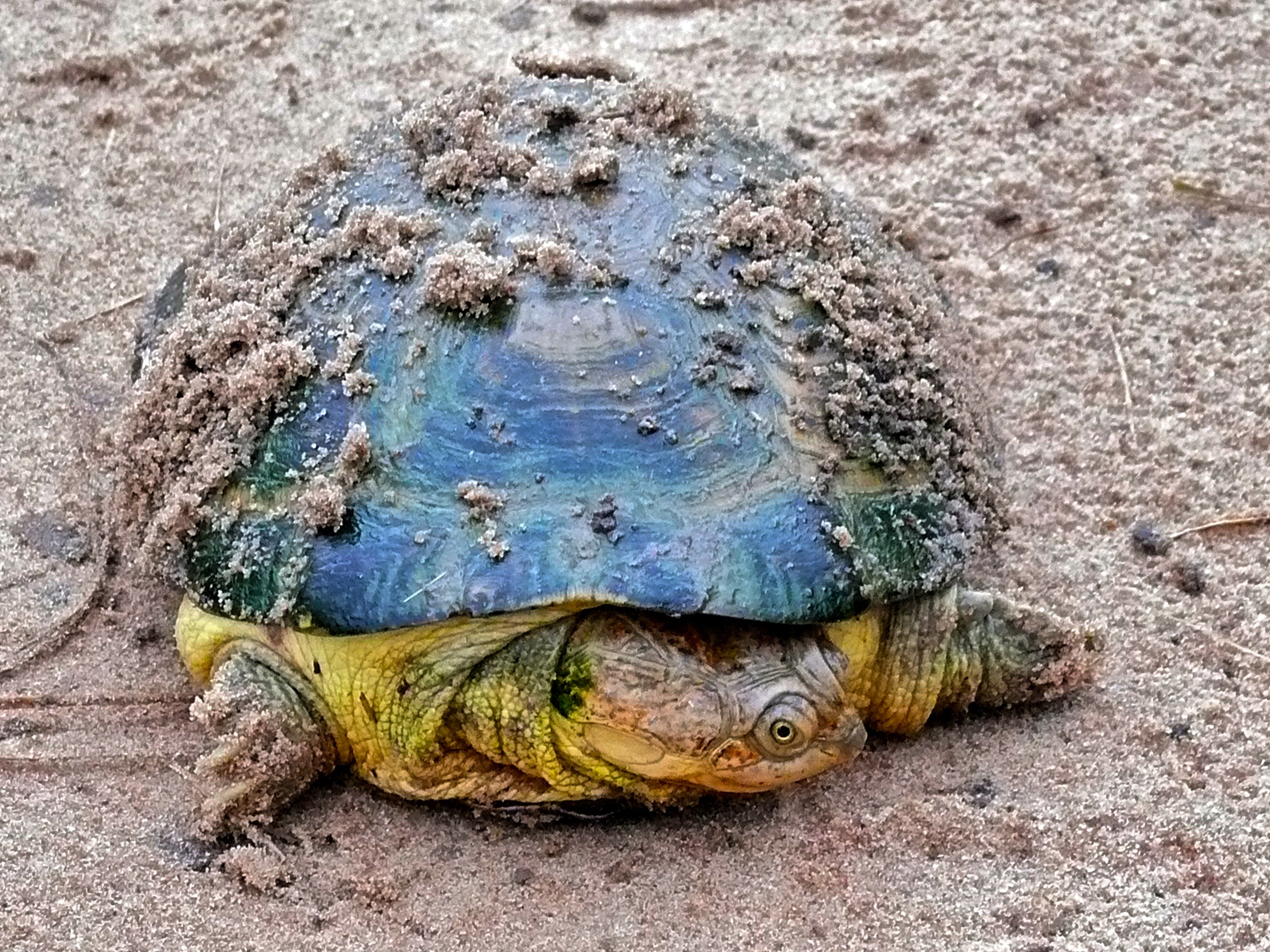

Conservation status
- Least Concern (IUCN 2.3)

Scientific classification
- Kingdom: Animalia
- Phylum: Chordata
- Class: Reptilia
- Order: Testudines
- Suborder: Pleurodira
- Family: Pelomedusidae
- Genus: Pelusios
- Species: P. williamsi

Binomial name
- Pelusios williamsi Laurent, 1965

Synonyms
- None

= Williams' mud turtle =

Species of turtle

Williams' mud turtle (Pelusios williamsi) is a species of turtle in the family Pelomedusidae. The species is endemic to Africa.

== Etymology ==
The specific name, williamsi, is in honor of American herpetologist Ernest E. Williams.

== Geographic range ==
Pelusios williamsi is found in the Democratic Republic of the Congo, Kenya, Tanzania, and Uganda.

== Subspecies ==
- P. w. williamsi Laurent, 1956 - Lake Victoria mud turtle
- P. w. laurenti Bour, 1984 - Ukerewe Island mud turtle
- P. w. lutescens Laurent, 1956 - Albert Nile mud turtle

== Bibliography ==
- Rhodin, Anders G.J.; van Dijk, Peter Paul; Iverson, John B.; Shaffer, H. Bradley; Roger, Bour (2011-12-31). "Turtles of the world, 2011 update: Annotated checklist of taxonomy, synonymy, distribution and conservation status" (PDF). Chelonian Research Monographs. 6. Archived (PDF) from the original on 2012-01-31.
- Fritz, Uwe; Havaš, Peter (2007-10-31). "Checklist of Chelonians of the World" (PDF). Archived from the original (PDF) on 2011-05-01.
