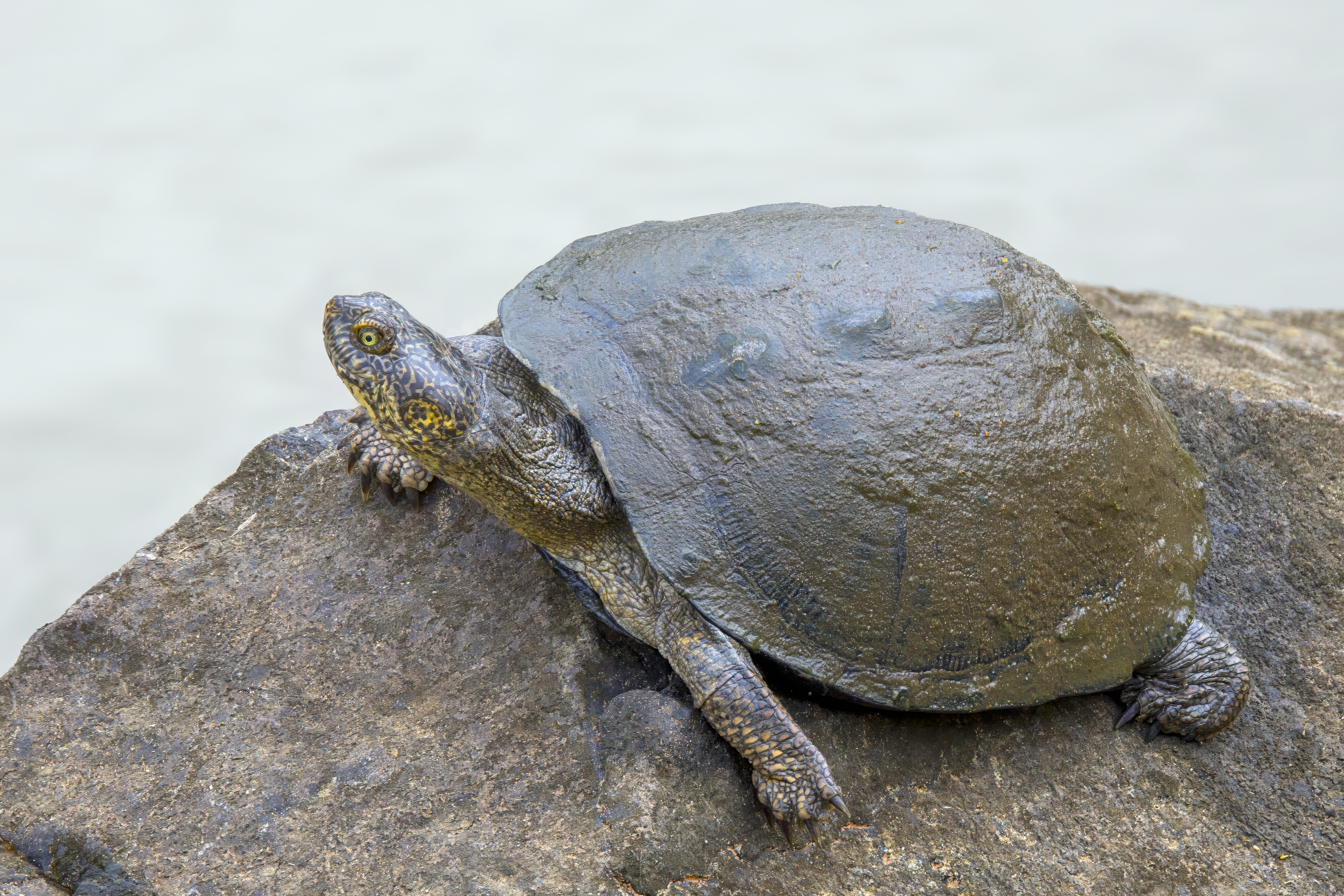

Scientific classification
- Kingdom: Animalia
- Phylum: Chordata
- Class: Reptilia
- Order: Testudines
- Suborder: Pleurodira
- Family: Pelomedusidae
- Genus: Pelusios
- Species: P. sinuatus

Binomial name
- Pelusios sinuatus (A. Smith, 1838)

Synonyms
- Sternotherus sinuatus A. Smith, 1838; Sternothaerus sinuatus — Boulenger, 1889; Pelusios sinuatus — Schmidt, 1919

= Serrated hinged terrapin =

African terrapin

The serrated hinged terrapin (Pelusios sinuatus) is a species of turtle in the family Pelomedusidae. The species is native to East Africa and Southern Africa. There are two recognised subspecies.

== Geographic range ==
P. sinuatus is found in Botswana, Democratic Republic of the Congo, Ethiopia, Kenya, Malawi, Mozambique, Namibia, Somalia, South Africa, South Sudan, Tanzania, Zambia, and Zimbabwe.

== Habitat and behaviour ==
The preferred natural habitats of P. sinuatus are tropical lakes and rivers, where it can often be seen basking on logs, rocks, or mud banks, or even on the backs of sleeping hippopotami.

== Diet ==
P. sinuatus eats water snails, soft-weed, and insects.

== Description ==
The largest species in the genus Pelusios, P. sinuatus has a straight carapace length of up to 55 cm (22 in). Females are larger than males. Males can also be distinguished by their slightly longer tails.

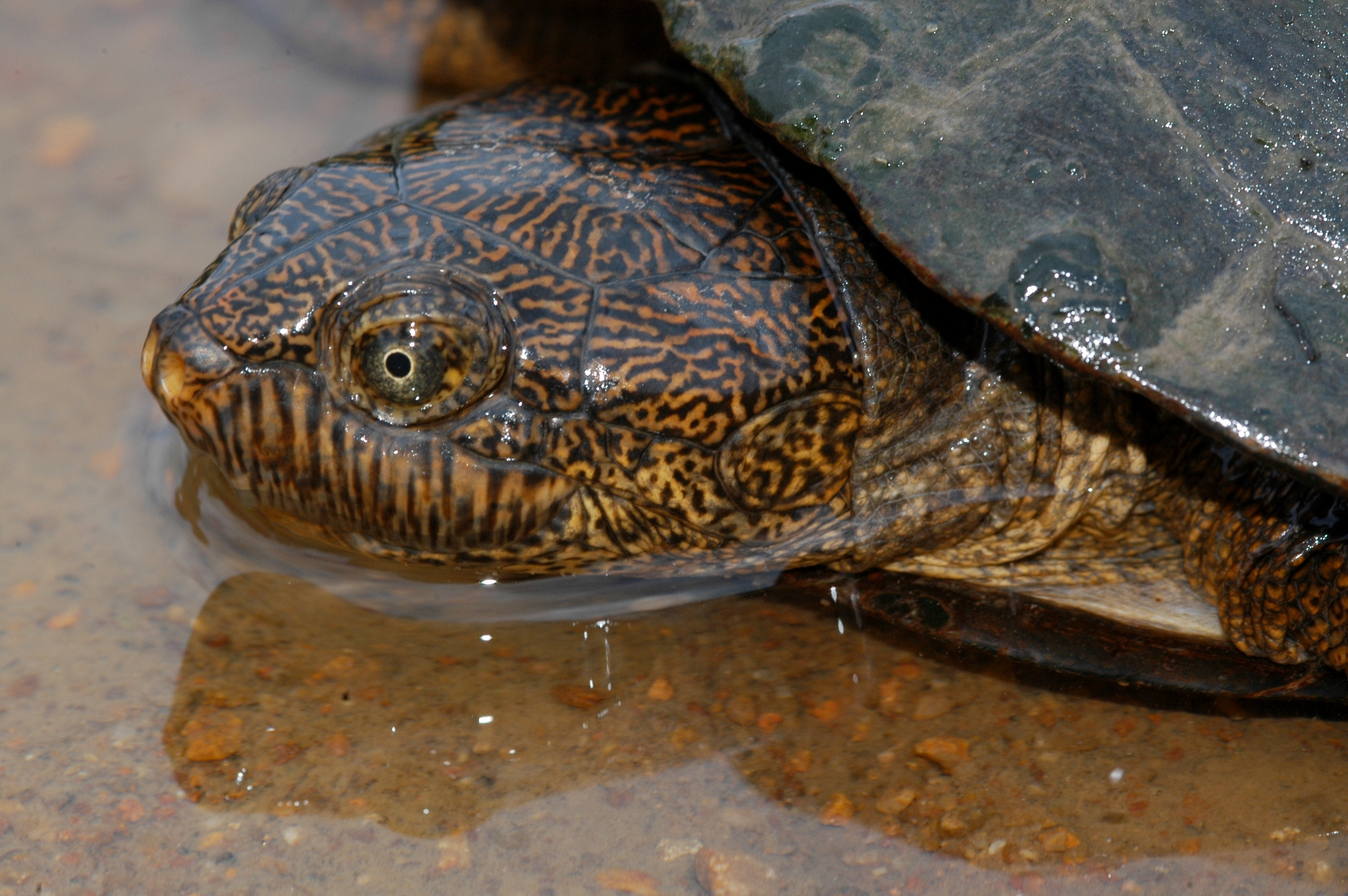
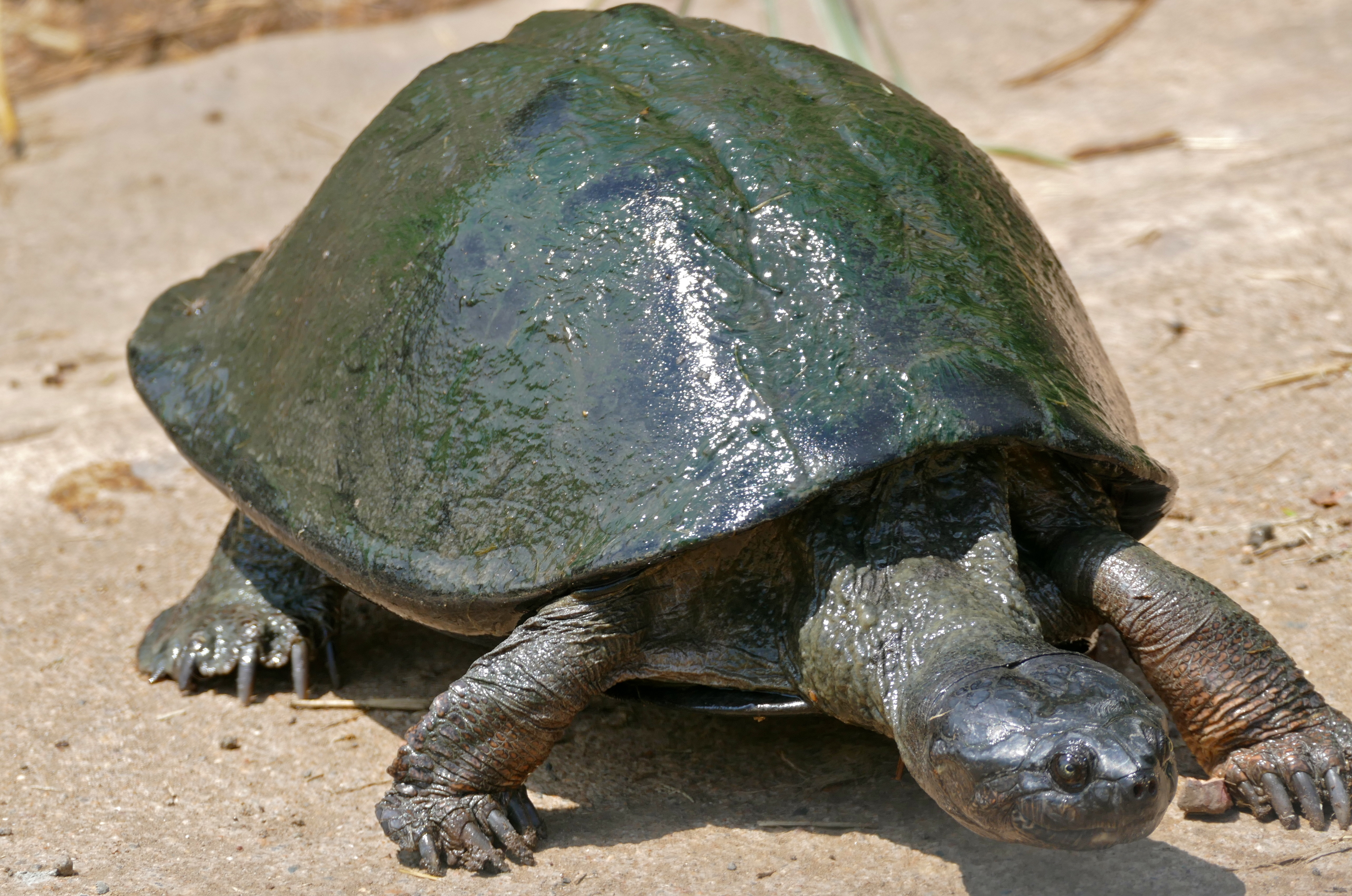
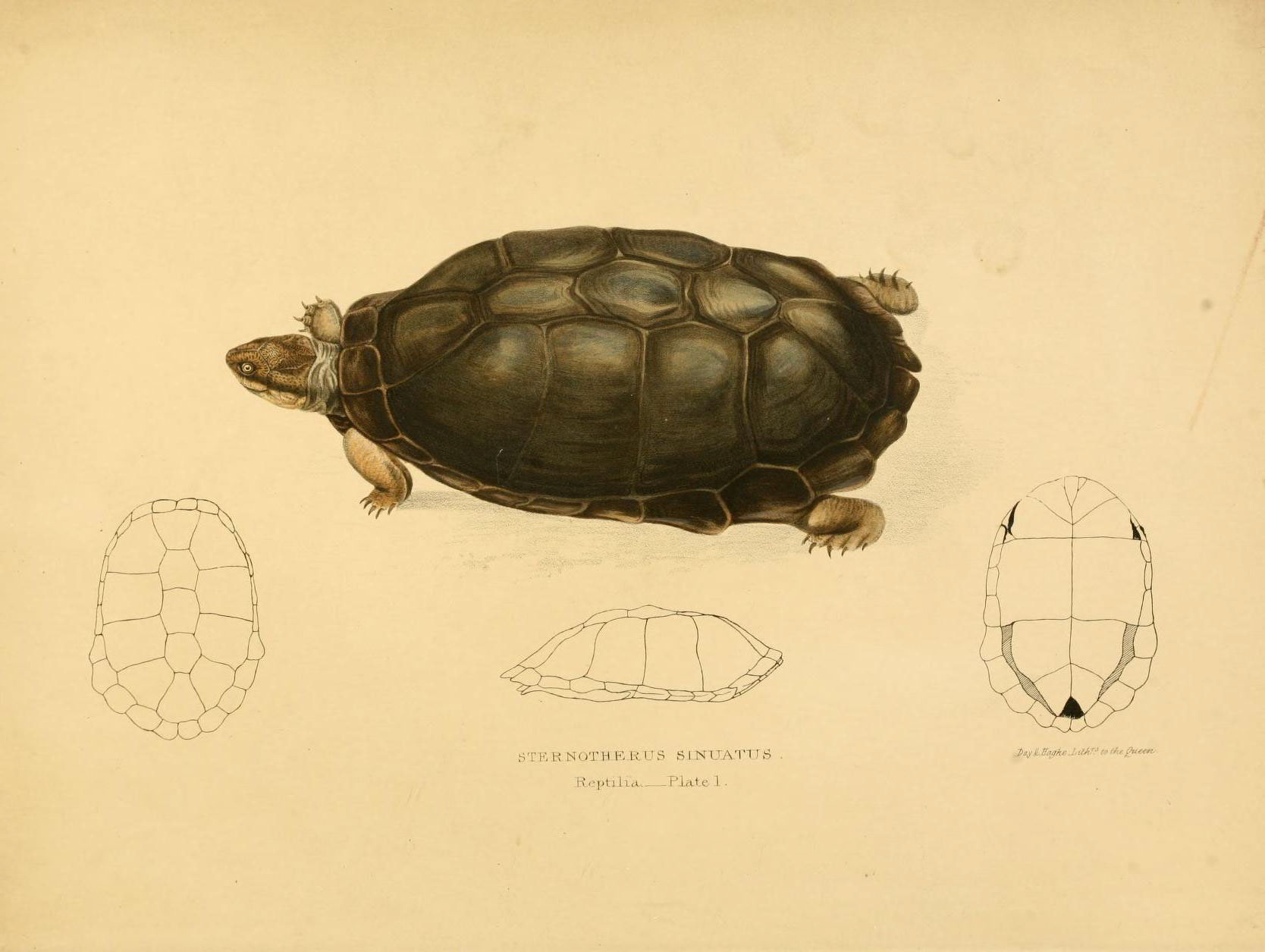

== Defence ==
For defence, the hinged plastron of P. sinuatus closes to protect the head and forelimbs. The serrated hinged terrapin also secretes a foul odour when threatened.

== Breeding ==
The female serrated hinged terrapin lays seven to 25 eggs, up to 500 m (1,600 ft) from the nearest water, in October to January. Hatchlings appear in March to April.

== Subspecies ==
The following two subspecies are recognised as being valid, including the nominotypical subspecies.

- Pelusios sinuatus bottegi Boulenger, 1895
- Pelusios sinuatus sinuatus A. Smith, 1838

== Etymology ==
The subspecific name, bottegi is in honour of Italian explorer Vittorio Bottego.

== See also ==
- Pelomedusa subrufa, a similar species
