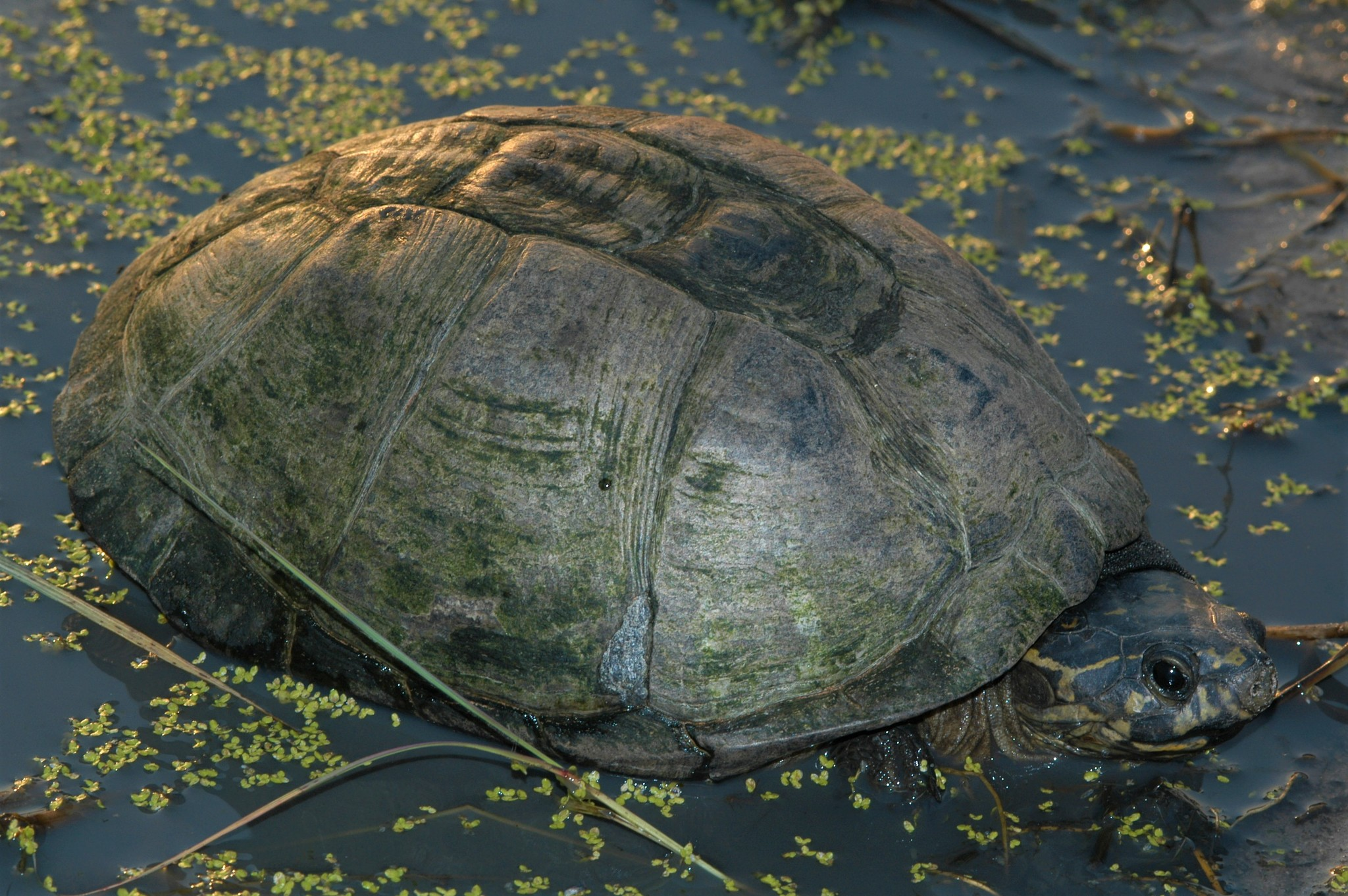

Conservation status
- Least Concern (IUCN 2.3)

Scientific classification
- Kingdom: Animalia
- Phylum: Chordata
- Class: Reptilia
- Order: Testudines
- Suborder: Pleurodira
- Family: Pelomedusidae
- Genus: Pelusios
- Species: P. bechuanicus

Binomial name
- Pelusios bechuanicus FitzSimons, 1932

Synonyms
- Pelusios bechuanicus FitzSimons, 1932; Pelusios castaneus bechuanicus Mertens, 1971; Pelusios bechuanicus bechuanicus Broadley, 1981

= Okavango mud turtle =

Species of turtle

The Okavango mud turtle or Okavango terrapin) (Pelusios bechuanicus) is a species of turtle in the family Pelomedusidae endemic to Africa. It is found in Angola, Botswana, the Democratic Republic of the Congo, Namibia (Caprivi), Zambia, and Zimbabwe.

== Distribution ==
Found in central Africa, central Angola, northeastern Namibia, northern Botswana, Zimbabwe, and Zambia

== Description ==
The Okavango mud turtle is the largest species of the genus Pelusios. The carapace is oval and elongated, with a pronounced dome, and is evenly rounded at the edges which allows the turtle to appear as a smooth rock. The carapace is very dark, often almost black, and lightens up to yellow or orange only at the sides. The plastron is well developed and can close the shell completely, with a rounded front lobe that comes together to form the hinge that is characteristic of the genus.

== Biology ==
The turtle is observed most often in clear, deep, calm waters, in rivers, and in vegetation-choked swamps. It is a semi-aquatic animal that remains in the water most of the year. It is observed outside of the water habitat only when seeking temporary aquatic refuge during the dry season. The breeding season occurs during the southern summer and nests are quite large, between 20 and 50 eggs. The turtle is most frequent prey to the shoe-billed stork and it is characteristically a carnivore, feeding on fish and invertebrates.

== Bibliography ==
- Rhodin, Anders G.J.; van Dijk, Peter Paul; Iverson, John B.; Shaffer, H. Bradley; Roger, Bour (2011-12-31). "Turtles of the world, 2011 update: Annotated checklist of taxonomy, synonymy, distribution and conservation status" (PDF). Chelonian Research Monographs. 6. Archived (PDF) from the original on 2012-01-31.
- Fritz, Uwe; Havaš, Peter (2007-10-31). "Checklist of Chelonians of the World" (PDF). Archived (PDF) from the original on 2011-05-01.
