= Central African mud turtle =

Conservation status
- Least Concern (IUCN 2.3)

Scientific classification
- Kingdom: Animalia
- Phylum: Chordata
- Class: Reptilia
- Order: Testudines
- Suborder: Pleurodira
- Family: Pelomedusidae
- Genus: Pelusios
- Species: P. chapini

Binomial name
- Pelusios chapini Laurent, 1965

Synonyms
- Pelusios castaneus chapini Laurent, 1965; Pelusios chapini — Broadley, 1998

Species of turtle

The Central African mud turtle (Pelusios chapini) is a species of turtle in the family Pelomedusidae. The species is endemic to Central Africa.

== Etymology ==
The specific name, chapini, is in honor of American ornithologist James Paul Chapin.

== Geographic range ==
Pelusios chapini is found in the Central African Republic, the Democratic Republic of the Congo, Gabon, the Republic of the Congo, and Uganda

== Bibliography ==
- Rhodin, Anders G.J.; van Dijk, Peter Paul; Iverson, John B.; Shaffer, H. Bradley; Roger, Bour (2011-12-31). "Turtles of the world, 2011 update: Annotated checklist of taxonomy, synonymy, distribution and conservation status" (PDF). Chelonian Research Monographs. 6. Archived from the original (PDF) on 2012-01-31.
- Fritz, Uwe; Havaš, Peter (2007-10-31). "Checklist of Chelonians of the World" (PDF). Archived from the original (PDF) on 2011-05-01.
