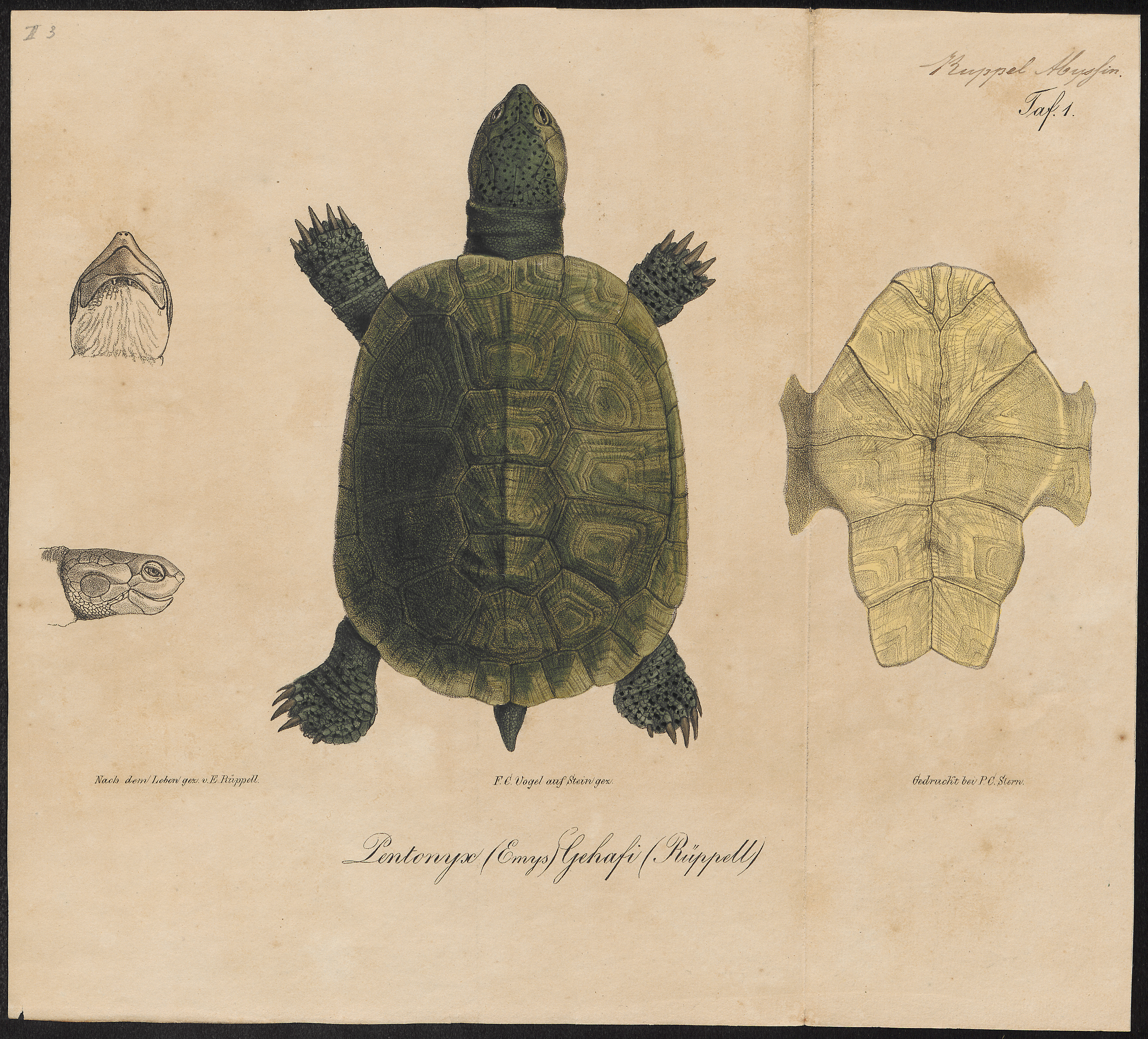
- Pelomedusa gehafie

Scientific classification
- Domain: Eukaryota
- Kingdom: Animalia
- Phylum: Chordata
- Class: Reptilia
- Order: Testudines
- Suborder: Pleurodira
- Family: Pelomedusidae
- Genus: Pelomedusa
- Species: P. gehafie

Binomial name
- Pelomedusa gehafie (Rüppell, 1835)

= Pelomedusa gehafie =

Species of turtle

The Eritrean helmeted turtle (Pelomedusa gehafie), also known as the Eritrean side-neck turtle, is a species of Pelomedusa known only from Eritrea. The species was first identified in 1835. It was declared extinct after not been seen for almost a century but some populations were rediscovered in 2016 in the streams of Damas river at Ghinda in the eastern coastal mountains.
