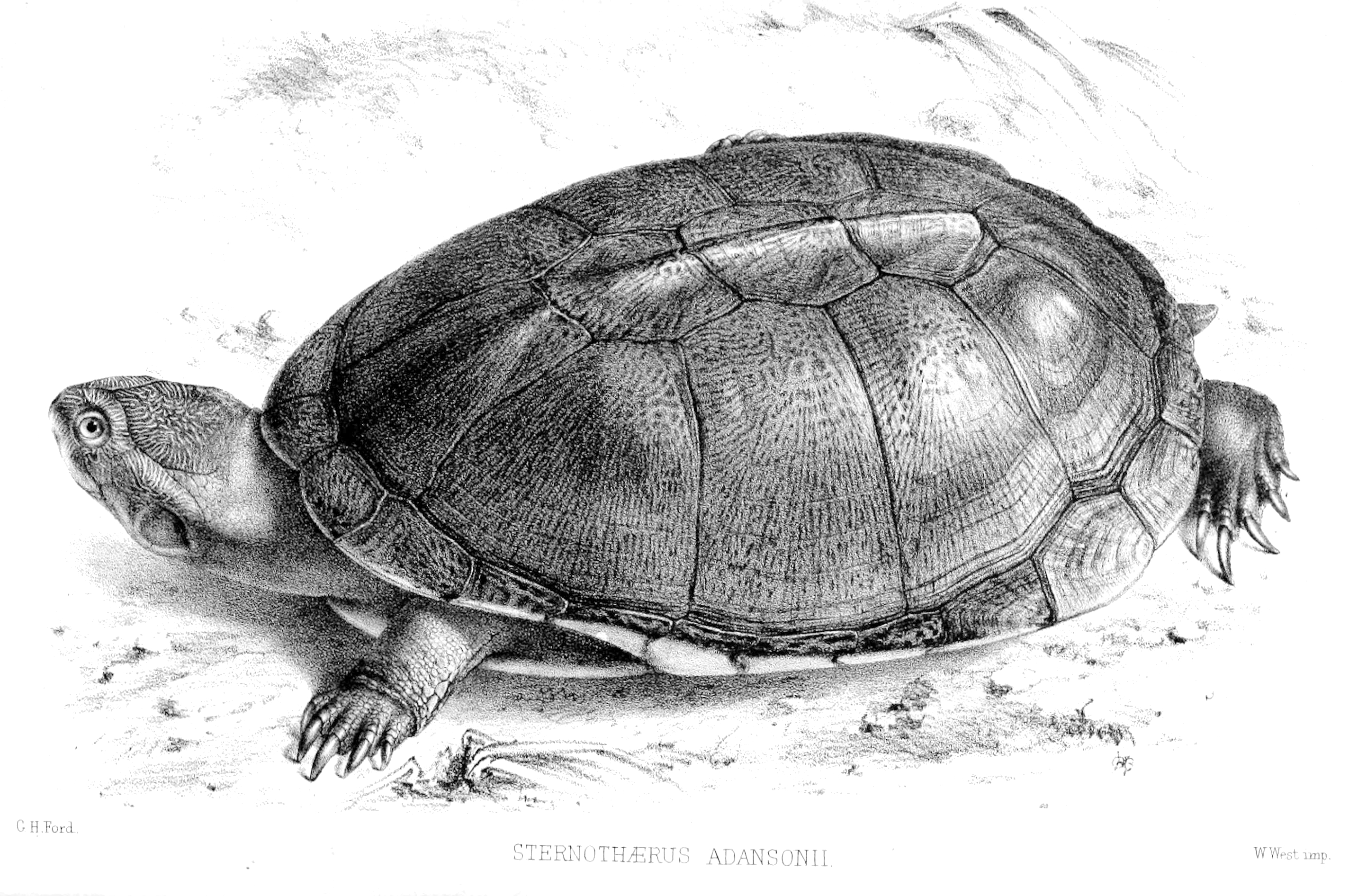

Scientific classification
- Kingdom: Animalia
- Phylum: Chordata
- Class: Reptilia
- Order: Testudines
- Suborder: Pleurodira
- Family: Pelomedusidae
- Genus: Pelusios
- Species: P. adansonii

Binomial name
- Pelusios adansonii (Schweigger, 1812)

Synonyms
- Emys adansonii Schweigger, 1812; Chelys (Hydraspis) adamsonii Gray in Griffith & Pidgeon, 1831 (ex errore); Hydraspis adansonii — Gray, 1831; Pentonyx andansonii A.M.C. Duméril & Bibron, 1835 (ex errore); Pelomedusa adansonii — Gray, 1844; Sternotherus adansonii — A.M.C. Duméril & Bibron in A.M.C. Duméril & A.H.A. Duméril, 1851; Sternothaerus adansonii — Gray, 1856; Pentonyx adansonii — Boulenger, 1889; Pelusios adansonii — Schmidt, 1919; Pelusios adansoni Mertens, L. Müller & Rust, 1934 (ex errore); Pelusios adansonii adansonii — Wermuth & Mertens, 1977; Pelusios adansoni adansoni — Obst, 1985

= Adanson's mud turtle =

Species of reptile

Adanson's mud turtle (Pelusios adansonii) is a species of turtle in the family Pelomedusidae. The species is endemic to north-central Africa.

== Taxonomy and etymology ==
August Friedrich Schweigger first described the turtle in 1812, based on remnants found in Senegal by French botanist Michel Adanson, for whom Schweigger named the new species as Emys andansonii.

== Geographic range ==
P. adansonii is found in Benin, Cameroon, the Central African Republic, Chad, Ethiopia, Mali, Mauritania, Niger, Nigeria, Senegal, South Sudan, and Sudan. There are at least three distinct populations within the turtle's distribution.

== Conservation status ==
Although Adanson's mud turtle does not seem to be at risk of becoming an endangered species, destruction of its habitat (largely due to farming) and hunting by humans have both reduced its population. Hunting by humans persists despite local laws forbidding the activity in some of the countries in which the turtle is found.

== Characteristics ==
Adanson's mud turtle is a medium-sized turtle that lives in freshwater. The turtle's shell can grow up to 238 mm (9.4 in) (straight carapace length) and is known to be sharp and rigid, with dark brown spots and dashes. The ventral part of the shell (plastron) is yellow.

== Diet ==
Adanson's mud turtle is carnivorous. It eats mollusks, fish, and small amphibians.

== Reserve ==
A refuge for Adanson's mud turtle has taken place in the wetland area on the northwest side of Guiers Lake in northern Senegal and it covers about 750 acres (1.17 mi^{2}). It is the first refuge of its kind that is dedicated to the conservation of Adanson's mud turtle and its nesting and foraging habits. It was created with the help of the Turtle Survival Alliance (TSA Africa) and the Ministry of Environment and Nature Protection of Senegal.
