= Upemba mud turtle =

Conservation status
- Data Deficient (IUCN 2.3)

Scientific classification
- Kingdom: Animalia
- Phylum: Chordata
- Class: Reptilia
- Order: Testudines
- Suborder: Pleurodira
- Family: Pelomedusidae
- Genus: Pelusios
- Species: P. upembae

Binomial name
- Pelusios upembae Broadley, 1981

Species of turtle

The Upemba mud turtle (Pelusios upembae) is a species of turtle in the family Pelomedusidae.

It is endemic to Democratic Republic of the Congo.
