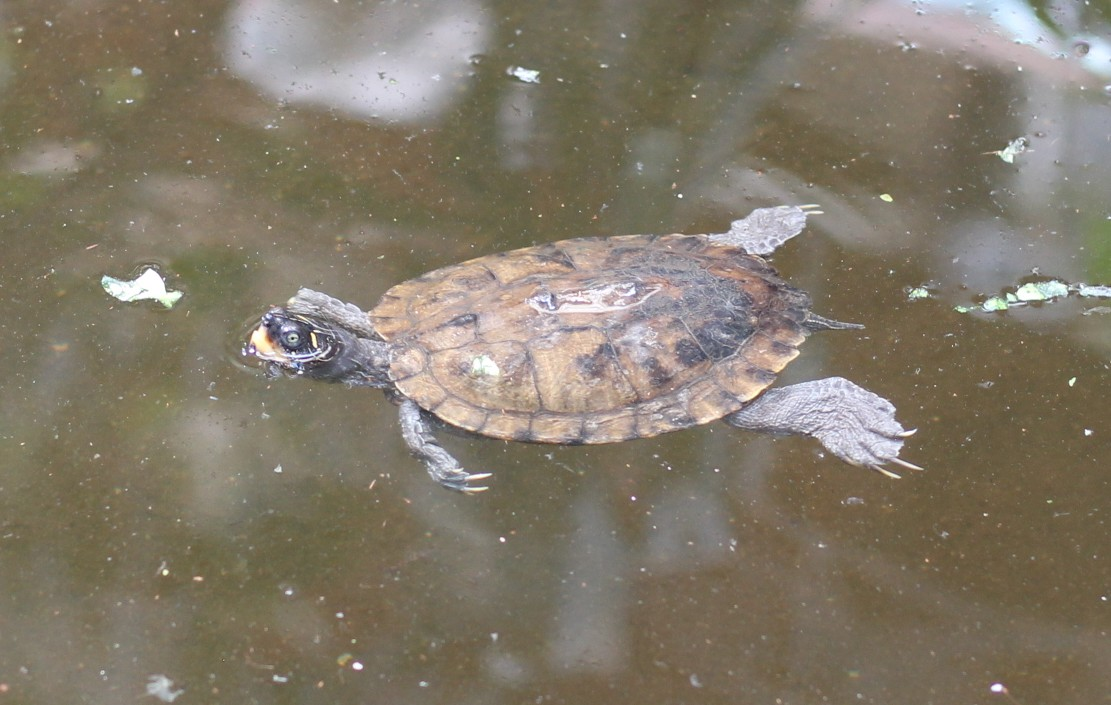

Scientific classification
- Kingdom: Animalia
- Phylum: Chordata
- Class: Reptilia
- Order: Testudines
- Suborder: Pleurodira
- Family: Pelomedusidae
- Genus: Pelusios
- Species: P. gabonensis

Binomial name
- Pelusios gabonensis Duméril, 1856

Synonyms
- Pentonyx gabonensis - Duméril, 1856; Pelomedusa gabonensis – Strauch, 1862; Pentonyx gaboonensis - Gray (ex errore), 1863; Pelomedusa gabonica - Peters (ex errore), 1864; Sternothaerus gabonensis – Bocage, 1866; Sternothaerus steindachneri - Siebenrock, 1902; Pelusios gabonensis – Schmidt, 1919

= African forest turtle =

Species of turtle

The African forest turtle (Pelusios gabonensis) is a species of turtle in the family Pelomedusidae. It is endemic to Africa, where it can be found in Angola, Burundi, Cameroon, Equatorial Guinea, Gabon, the Democratic Republic of the Congo, the Republic of the Congo, Ghana, Tanzania, and Uganda

== Description ==
The African forest turtle is a side-necked turtle; unable to fully withdraw their heads into their shells, they draw them to the side and fold them beneath the upper edge of their shells.

This species is characterized by a flattened, brown carapace with a black dorsal line. The plastron hinge is located in rear position.

== Bibliography ==
- Rhodin, Anders G.J.; van Dijk, Peter Paul; Iverson, John B.; Shaffer, H. Bradley; Roger, Bour (2011-12-31). "Turtles of the world, 2011 update: Annotated checklist of taxonomy, synonymy, distribution and conservation status" (PDF). Chelonian Research Monographs. 6. Archived from the original (PDF) on 2012-01-31.
- Fritz, Uwe; Havaš, Peter (2007-10-31). "Checklist of Chelonians of the World" (PDF). Archived from the original (PDF) on 2011-05-01.
