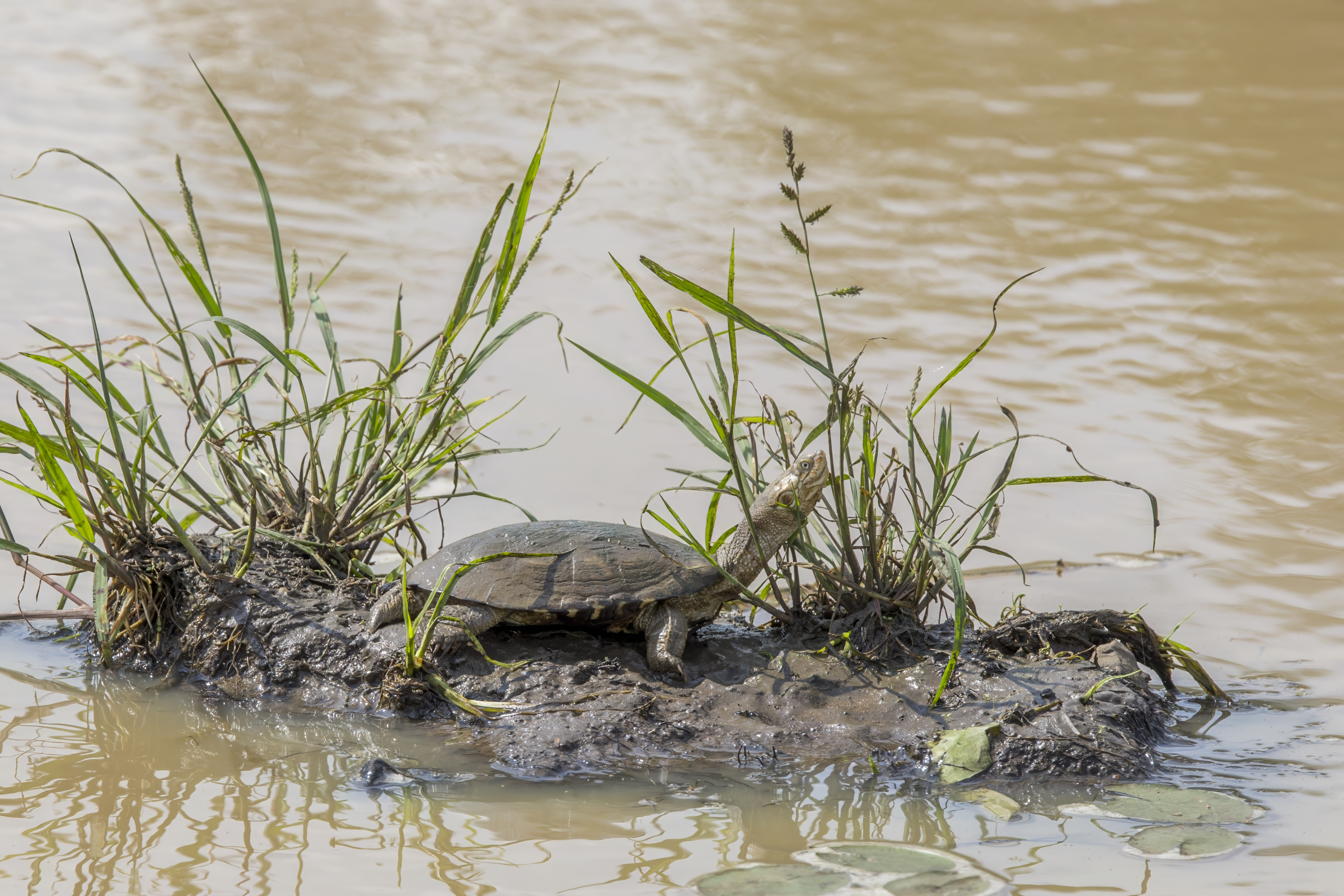

Conservation status
- Least Concern (IUCN 2.3)

Scientific classification
- Kingdom: Animalia
- Phylum: Chordata
- Class: Reptilia
- Order: Testudines
- Suborder: Pleurodira
- Family: Pelomedusidae
- Genus: Pelusios
- Species: P. castanoides

Binomial name
- Pelusios castanoides Hewitt, 1931

= Yellow-bellied mud turtle =

Species of turtle

The yellow-bellied mud turtle (Pelusios castanoides) is a species of turtle in the family Pelomedusidae. It is found in Madagascar, Malawi, Mozambique, Seychelles, South Africa, and Tanzania.

== Subspecies ==
- P. c. castanoides
- P. c. intergularis (Seychelles yellow-bellied mud turtle)

== Bibliography ==
- Rhodin, Anders G.J.; van Dijk, Peter Paul; Inverson, John B.; Shaffer, H. Bradley; Roger, Bour (2011-12-31). "Turtles of the world, 2011 update: Annotated checklist of taxonomy, synonymy, distribution and conservation status" (PDF). Chelonian Research Monographs. 6. Archived (PDF) from the original on 2012-01-31.
