= Turkana mud turtle =

Conservation status
- Vulnerable (IUCN 2.3)

Scientific classification
- Kingdom: Animalia
- Phylum: Chordata
- Class: Reptilia
- Order: Testudines
- Suborder: Pleurodira
- Family: Pelomedusidae
- Genus: Pelusios
- Species: P. broadleyi

Binomial name
- Pelusios broadleyi Bour, 1986

Synonyms
- Pelusios broadleyi Bour, 1986; Pelusios broadlyi Wood, 2006 (ex errore); Pelusios broadleyi — Livigni, 2013

Species of turtle

Pelusios broadleyi, commonly known as the Turkana mud turtle, Broadley's mud turtle, or the Lake Turkana hinged terrapin, is a species of turtle in the family Pelomedusidae. The species is native to eastern Africa.

== Geographic range ==
Pelusios broadleyi is endemic to Lake Turkana in East Africa. It has only been confirmed from the Kenyan part of this lake, but may well occur in the Ethiopian (it has been recorded very close to the border).

== Habitat ==
The preferred natural habitat of P. broadleyi is freshwater wetlands.

== Etymology ==
The specific name, broadleyi, is in honor of herpetologist Donald G. Broadley.
