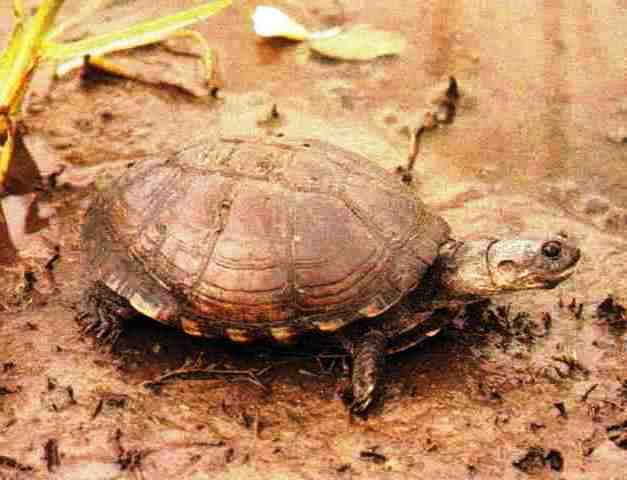

Conservation status
- Least Concern (IUCN 2.3)

Scientific classification
- Kingdom: Animalia
- Phylum: Chordata
- Class: Reptilia
- Order: Testudines
- Suborder: Pleurodira
- Family: Pelomedusidae
- Genus: Pelusios
- Species: P. subniger

Binomial name
- Pelusios subniger (Lacépède, 1788)

= East African black mud turtle =

Species of turtle

The East African black mud turtle (Pelusios subniger), also known as the Pan terrapin, is a species of turtle in the family Pelomedusidae, native to eastern and southeastern Africa.

== Description ==
The East African black mud turtle has a smooth, domed carapace with a length of 5.1-7.9 in. The carapace is typically dark brown, gray, or black, often with yellow or dark markings on the margins. They are rather dull in color like most of their genus. The plastron is hinged. The underside of the turtle can be brown, grey, black, or yellow. The upper jaw has a blunt, smooth shape. The head of an adult is generally uniform in color. As in all side-necked turtles, the neck retracts the head sideways instead of vertically into the shell. This species may be confused with the West African mud turtle.

Two subspecies are recognized:

- P. s. subniger Bonnaterre, 1789 - type species
- P. s. parietalis Bour, 1983 - Seychelles black mud turtle

== Distribution and habitat ==
The species occurs in much of eastern and southeastern tropical and subtropical Africa, with a southern limit in Zimbabwe, and including Madagascar and the Seychelles (P. s. parietalis in the latter location). Nonindigenous populations exist on Mauritius Island, Guadeloupe, Glorieuses Îsles, and Diego Garcia. It inhabits marshes, lakes and streams.

== Ecology ==
The East African black mud turtle is omnivorous and takes fish, invertebrates, and plants. It is known to reach an age of over fifty years in captivity and forty-seven years in the wild. Females lay nests of 3-12 eggs. They lay their eggs in the spring and bury them in mud. Eggs take about two months to hatch. Although the East African black mud turtle can be seen basking throughout the day, they are more active at night and are considered to be nocturnal. They have been observed to burrow into the mud to regulate their body temperature.

== Conservation ==
The nominate subspecies is currently classified as least concern by the IUCN, while the Seychelles subspecies is thought to be critically endangered.

== In captivity ==
The East African black mud turtle does well in captivity. It is a hearty, mid-sized turtle that does well in a twenty-gallon tank. They must be given room to swim and ideally a place to bask under a warm light as well. They can experience skin problems if the Ph of the water is not maintained between 6.0 and 6.5. As tropical species, a temperature of 78-82 degrees F should be maintained. These turtles are easy to handle and are not aggressive towards humans but are highly aggressive towards other turtles, thus cannot be housed with other breeds of turtles and should be introduced slowly to conspecifics. They will attack and kill birds, mice, insects and nearly anything else they can get a hold of so if you house them outdoors screening over their habitat is a good consideration. Although these turtles rarely get sick, allowing birds and rodents into their habitat could also introduce disease.
