= Nactus soniae =

Nactus acutus

Conservation status
- Extinct (IUCN 3.1)

Scientific classification
- Kingdom: Animalia
- Phylum: Chordata
- Class: Reptilia
- Order: Squamata
- Suborder: Gekkota
- Family: Gekkonidae
- Genus: Nactus
- Species: †N. soniae

Binomial name
- †Nactus soniae Arnold & Bour, 2008

Species of lizard

Nactus soniae is a species of lizard in the family Gekkonidae. It is endemic to Réunion. It is probably extinct as this species has been described based on subfossil remains and DNA data. It is named after Sonia Ribes-Beaudemoulin, the curator of the Muséum d’Histoire Naturelle, Saint-Denis, La Réunion, who organized expeditions to collect fossils on Réunion Island.
