= African keeled mud turtle =

Conservation status
- Least Concern (IUCN 2.3)

Scientific classification
- Domain: Eukaryota
- Kingdom: Animalia
- Phylum: Chordata
- Class: Reptilia
- Order: Testudines
- Suborder: Pleurodira
- Family: Pelomedusidae
- Genus: Pelusios
- Species: P. carinatus

Binomial name
- Pelusios carinatus Laurent, 1956

Synonyms
- Pelusios carinatus Laurent, 1956

Species of turtle

The African keeled mud turtle (Pelusios carinatus) is a species of turtle in the family Pelomedusidae. It is endemic to central Africa : the Democratic Republic of the Congo, the Republic of the Congo, and Gabon.

== Bibliography ==
- Rhodin, Anders G.J.; van Dijk, Peter Paul; Iverson, John B.; Shaffer, H. Bradley; Roger, Bour (2011-12-31). "Turtles of the world, 2011 update: Annotated checklist of taxonomy, synonymy, distribution and conservation status" (PDF). Chelonian Research Monographs. 6. Archived from the original (PDF) on 2012-01-31.
- Fritz, Uwe; Havaš, Peter (2007-10-31). "Checklist of Chelonians of the World" (PDF). Archived from the original (PDF) on 2011-05-01.
