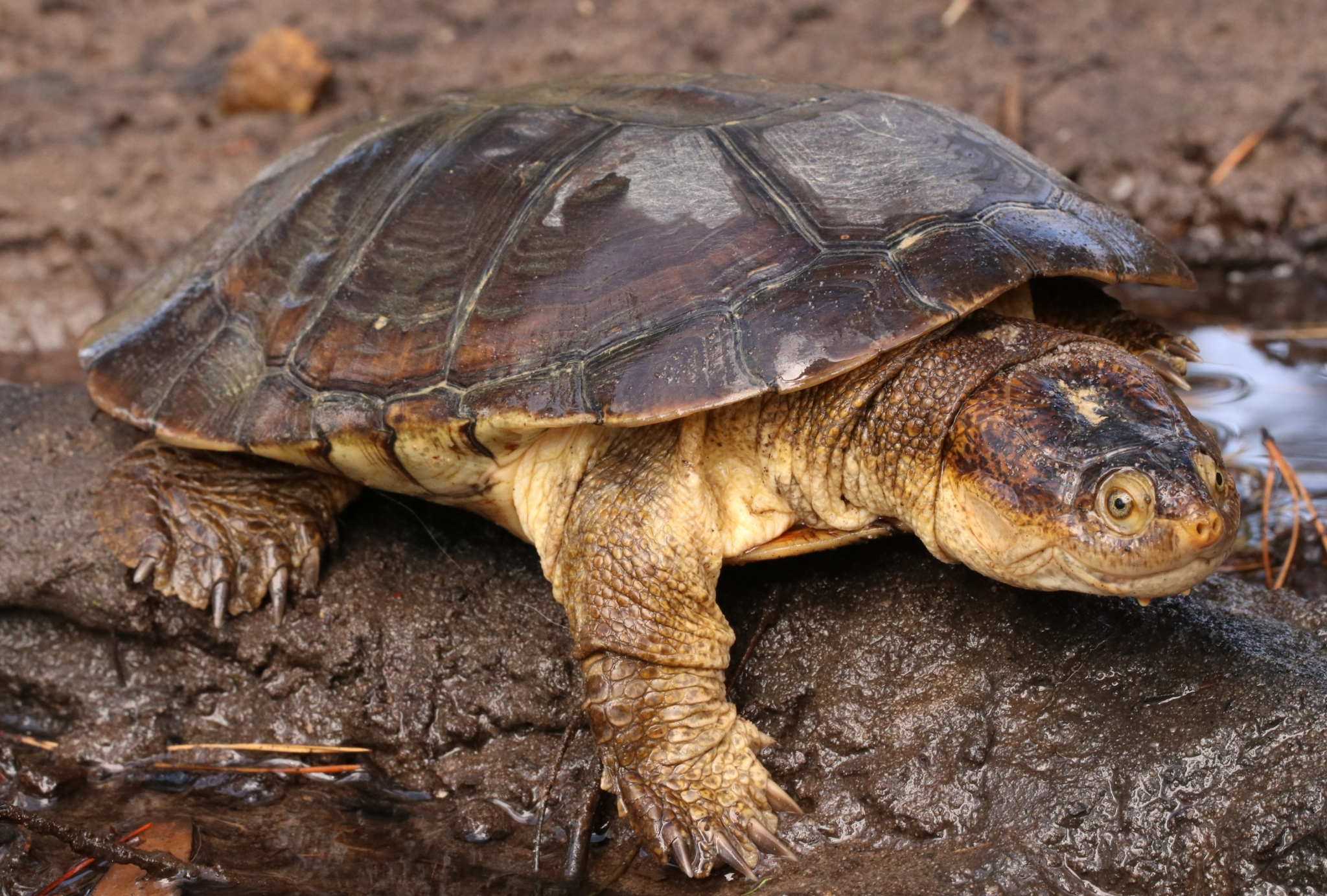

Conservation status
- Least Concern (IUCN 3.1)

Scientific classification
- Kingdom: Animalia
- Phylum: Chordata
- Class: Reptilia
- Order: Testudines
- Suborder: Pleurodira
- Family: Pelomedusidae
- Genus: Pelomedusa
- Species: P. galeata

Binomial name
- Pelomedusa galeata Schoepff, 1792

= Pelomedusa galeata =

Species of turtle

Pelomedusa galeata, commonly known as the South African helmeted terrapin and the cape terrapin, is a species of side-necked terrapin in the family Pelomedusidae. It is endemic to South Africa, Eswatini and southern Mozambique.

== Range ==
The cape terrapin is found in all South African provinces, Eswatini and southern Mozambique. It is absent from the Bushmanland bioregion in the Northern Cape.

== Description ==
Adults average 26 cm (10 in) in straight carapace length; and up to 32.5 cm (12.8 in) in exceptional cases.

== Habitat ==
The cape terrapin is found in fresh and stagnant water bodies, but not in mountainous or forested terrain.

== Reproduction ==
Mating of the cape terrapin occurs during spring. Nesting occurs from late spring to autumn. Up to 30 eggs are laid in an 18 by 9 cm (7.1 by 3.5 in) chamber close to the water. Incubation is roughly three months.

== Conservation status ==
As of 2017, the cape terrapin has been assessed as least concern due to its widespread occurrence. The population group in western South Africa could be a candidate species.
