= Pelusios marani =

Conservation status
- Not evaluated (IUCN 3.1)

Scientific classification
- Kingdom: Animalia
- Phylum: Chordata
- Class: Reptilia
- Order: Testudines
- Suborder: Pleurodira
- Family: Pelomedusidae
- Genus: Pelusios
- Species: P. marani

Binomial name
- Pelusios marani Bour, 2000

Species of turtle

Pelusios marani, also known commonly as the Gabon mud turtle, is a species of turtle in the family Pelomedusidae. The species is native to Central Africa.

== Etymology ==
The specific name, marani, is in honor of herpetologist Jérôme Maran.

== Geographic range ==
Pelusios marani is found in Gabon and the Republic of the Congo.

== Habitat ==
The preferred natural habitat of Pelusios marani is bodies of fresh water such as lakes and quiet rivers.

== Reproduction ==
Like all turtles, Pelusios marani is oviparous.

== Bibliography ==
- Bonin, F.; Devaux, B.; Dupré, A. (2006). Turtles of the World. Translated by Peter C. H. Pritchard. Baltimore: Johns Hopkins University Press. ISBN 0801884969. 416 pp. (Pelusios marani, p. 92).
- Bour R (2000). "Une nouvelle espèce de Pelusios du Gabon (Reptilia, Chelonii, Pelomedusidae)". Manouria 3 (8): 1–32. (Pelusios marani, new species). (in French).
- Rhodin, Anders G.J.; van Dijk, Peter Paul; Iverson, John B.; Shaffer, H. Bradley; Bour, Roger (2011-12-31). "Turtles of the world, 2011 update: Annotated checklist of taxonomy, synonymy, distribution and conservation status" (PDF). Chelonian Research Monographs. 6. Archived (PDF) from the original on 2012-01-31.
- Fritz, Uwe; Havaš, Peter (2007-10-31). "Checklist of Chelonians of the World" (PDF). Archived (PDF) from the original on 2011-05-01.
