= African dwarf mud turtle =

Scientific classification
- Kingdom: Animalia
- Phylum: Chordata
- Class: Reptilia
- Order: Testudines
- Suborder: Pleurodira
- Family: Pelomedusidae
- Genus: Pelusios
- Species: P. nanus

Binomial name
- Pelusios nanus Laurent, 1965

Synonyms
- Pelusios adansonii nanus – Wermuth & Mertens, 1977; Pelusios adansoni nanus – Obst, 1985

Species of turtle

The African dwarf mud turtle (Pelusios nanus) is a species of turtle in the family Pelomedusidae. It is endemic to Africa : in Angola, the Democratic Republic of the Congo, Malawi, and Zambia. These mud turtles are the smallest of all African turtle species, “Nanus” which they are referred to are one of the 3 smallest turtle species in the world. The other two are Stink Pot Musk and Muhlenberg's Bog Turtles. All 3 species barely reach 4 inches as full grown adults. Like many of the world's chelonians, Pelusios castaneus has the potential to live a long life. Reports typically suggest more than 50 years in captivity for this species.

== Bibliography ==
- Rhodin, Anders G.J.; van Dijk, Peter Paul; Inverson, John B.; Shaffer, H. Bradley; Roger, Bour (31 December 2011). "Turtles of the world, 2011 update: Annotated checklist of taxonomy, synonymy, distribution and conservation status" (PDF). Chelonian Research Monographs. 6. Archived from the original (PDF) on 31 January 2012.
- Fritz, Uwe; Havaš, Peter (31 October 2007). "Checklist of Chelonians of the World" (PDF). Archived from the original (PDF) on 1 May 2011.
