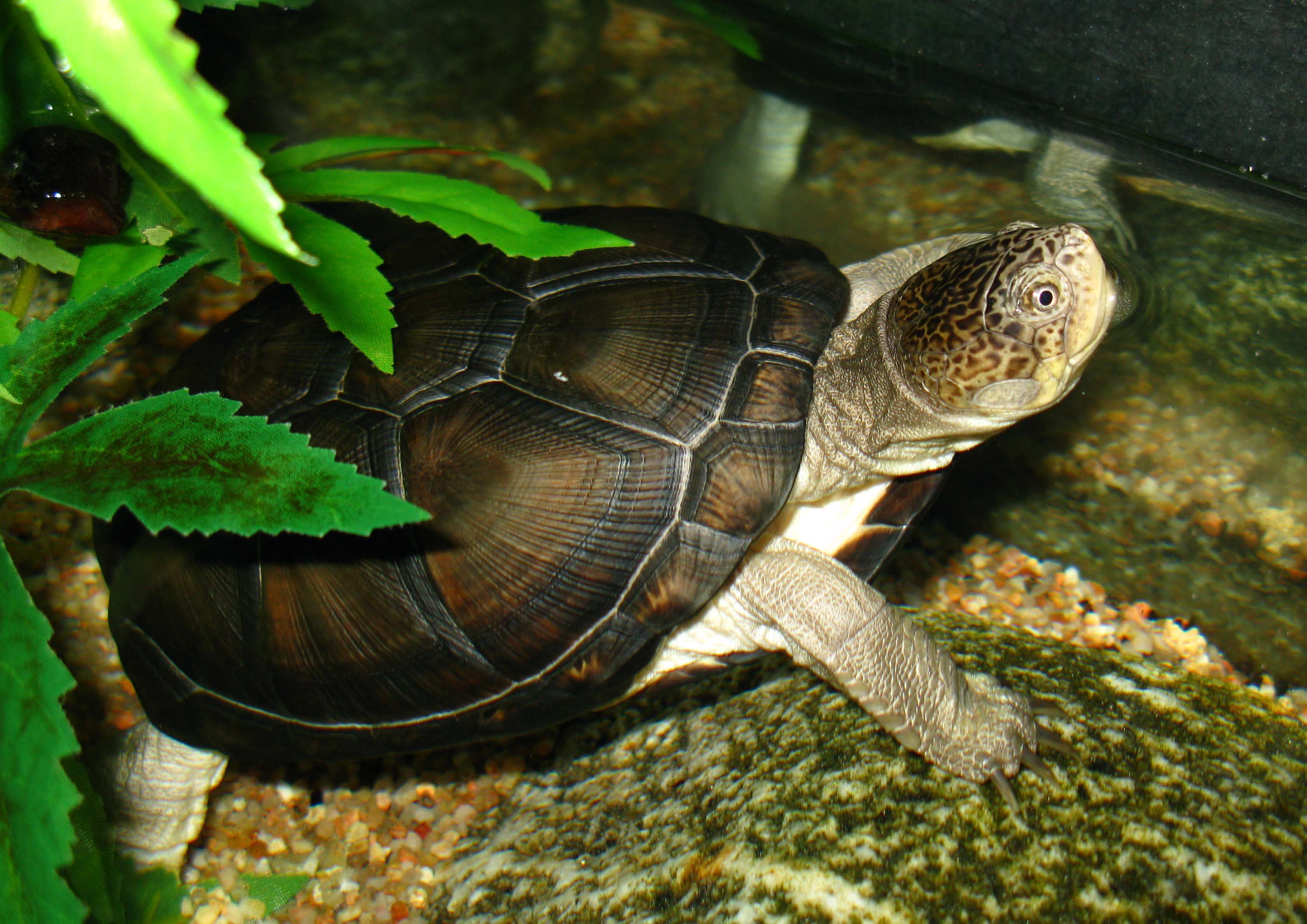
- Pelusios castaneus

Scientific classification
- Kingdom: Animalia
- Phylum: Chordata
- Class: Reptilia
- Order: Testudines
- Suborder: Pleurodira
- Family: Pelomedusidae
- Genus: Pelusios; Wagler, 1830

Species
- See text

Synonyms
- Sternothaerus Bell, 1825; Anota Gray, 1863; Notoa Gray, 1863; Tanoa Gray, 1863

= Pelusios =

Pelusios Temporal range: Early Miocene-Recent

Genus of turtles

Pelusios is a genus of African side-necked turtles. With 17 described species, it is one of the most diverse genera of the turtle order (Testudines).

== Etymology ==
The scientific name Pelusios is derived from the Greek word pēlos, which means "mud" or "clay", and this is reflected by the turtles living in streams and rivers with a muddy bottom.

== Common names ==
Common names for the genus Pelusios include hinged terrapins, African mud turtles, and mud terrapins.

== Taxonomy ==
Several species have been described, with probably numerous undescribed species. The taxonomy of the genus is very confused, as these species show many local variations. Certain species, in isolated areas or with reduced populations, need to be observed as they face a distinct extinction possibility given the significant number collected by native people.

== Geographic range ==
They are found throughout Sub-Saharan Africa, Madagascar, São Tomé, and the Seychelles islands. They have also been introduced on the islands of the Lesser Antilles.

== Description ==
The African mud turtles range from being small in size, only 12 cm (4.7 in) carapace length for adult Pelusios nanus, to moderately large, 46 cm (18 in) for adult Pelusios sinuatus, while the large majority of species fall between 20 and 30 cm (7.9 and 11.8 in) carapace length. The carapaces are oblong, moderately high-domed, and the plastrons are large and hinged which is what distinguishes them from the Pelomedusa. The plastron contains a mesoplastron and also well-developed plastral buttresses that articulate with the costals on each side of the carapace. The carapace has 11 pairs of sutured peripherals around its margin and a neck without costiform processes. The jaw closure articulates on a pterygoid trochlear surface which lacks a synovial capsule but instead contains a saclike duct full of fluid from the mouth cavity. The head shape is wide and flat, with a seemingly "smiling" face created by the jaw closure. The skull lacks the epipterygoid bone (bone above the pterygoid extending to parietal bone) and parietal-squamosal contact but possesses an internal carotid canal and strong postorbital-squamosal contact.

== Biology ==
The mud terrapins are either semiaquatic or fully aquatic and typically walk on the floor of slow-moving waters. They are most often observed in lakes, swamps or marshes but occasionally witnessed in ephemeral waterways. They are predominantly carnivorous, eating a variety of arthropods, worms, or other small animals found by way of foraging the bottom of their aquatic habitats. They do not undergo prolonged estivation or hibernation in the dried mud during dry season; instead, they need to find a wet or humid place to survive. Pelusios generally produce small to modest clutches of 6 to 18 eggs, depending upon female size. Egg deposition occurs in the more equitable season of the year, with known incubation periods ranging from 8–10 weeks. The reported karyotype is 2N = 34 with 22 macrochromosomes and 12 microchromosomes. The southern group of the genus Pelomedusa is shown to be paraphyletically similar to Pelusios through mitochondrial DNA analyses. From fossil evidence, it is suggested that the genera diverged in, or before the lower Miocene era.

== List of species ==
The species in the genus Pelusios can be divided into two groups based on shell morphology. The "adansonii group" (also known as the "gabonensis group" or the "adansonii-gabonensis group") includes P. adansonii, P. broadleyi, P. gabonensis, P. marani, and P. nanus. Species in the "adansonii group" are characterized by short abdominal scutes relative to the elongate anterior plastral lobe, as well as a short bridge between the carapace and the plastron. All of the remaining species are characterized by relatively longer abdominal scutes and a longer bridge between the carapace and plastron and are referred to as the "subniger group". Species in the "subniger group" exhibit greater mobility of the plastral front lobe than those belonging to the "adansonii group".

=== Extant Species ===
Common name	Scientific name (Note: A binomial authority in parentheses indicates the species was originally described in a genus other than Pelusios.)	IUCN Red List status	Picture
Adanson's mud turtle	Pelusios adansonii (Schweigger, 1812)	LC	
Okavango mud turtle	Pelusios bechuanicus V. FitzSimons, 1932	LC	
Turkana mud turtle	Pelusios broadleyi Bour, 1986	VU	
African keeled mud turtle	Pelusios carinatus Laurent, 1956	LC	
West African mud turtle	Pelusios castaneus (Schweigger, 1812)	LC	
Yellow-bellied mud turtle	Pelusios castanoides Hewitt, 1931 Subspecies: P. c. castanoides Hewitt, 1931; P. c. intergularis Bour, 1983	LC	
Central African mud turtle	Pelusios chapini Laurent, 1965	LC	
Ivory Coast mud turtle	Pelusios cupulatta Bour & Maran, 2003	NE	
African forest turtle	Pelusios gabonensis (A.H.A. Duméril, 1856)	LC	
	Pelusios marani Bour, 2000	NE	
African dwarf mud turtle	Pelusios nanus Laurent, 1956	DD	
West African black turtle	Pelusios niger (A.M.C. Duméril & Bibron, 1835)	LC	
Variable mud turtle	Pelusios rhodesianus Hewitt, 1927	LC	
Serrated hinged terrapin	Pelusios sinuatus A. Smith, 1838	LC	
East African black mud turtle	Pelusios subniger (Lacépède, 1789) Subspecies: P. s. subniger (Lacépède, 1789); P. s. parietalis Bour, 1983	LC	
Upemba mud turtle	Pelusios upembae Broadley, 1981	DD	
Williams' mud turtle	Pelusios williamsi Laurent, 1965 Subspecies: P. w. williamsi Laurent, 1965; P. w. laurenti Bour, 1984; P. w. lutescens Laurent, 1965	LC	

=== Extinct Species ===
- †Pelusios awashi, Late Pliocene 3.42—2.90 Mya (Ethiopia)
- †Pelusios dewitzianus, Pliocene (Egypt)
- †Pelusios rudolphi, Early Pleistocene (Ethiopia)
- †Pelusios rusingae, Early Miocene (23.0-16.0 Mya) of Kenya

== Status ==
Based on field surveys, a 50% decrease has been observed in the Seychelles terrapins, which include various Pelusios species. Seychelles is considered a hotspot for biodiversity, as it is one of the most threatened reservoirs of plant life and animal life, as well as one of the richest environments. The species are endangered due to threat of drainage, predation, and invasion by alien flora, combined with a shrunken living area. Most habitat destruction is from human population expansion, specifically in the granitic islands due to increased development pressures. Hope for reversal of this trend is evidenced by the rapid population recovery of Pelusios subniger parietalis on Frégate Island after habitat improvement. Global climate change has recently been recognized as one of the largest threats to biodiversity. This climate change has the ability to change species survival by causing changes in ecosystem structures, yet the effect is heightened in endemic species. Several reviews undertaken for the study of potential effects of global warming on biodiversity have provided evidence for Africa being the most vulnerable of all continents. Climate change is likely to be devastating for many species confined to small islands such as Seychelles. Endemic species such as Pelusios could suffer the worst impact of climate change because of their restricted range and narrow ecological requirements.

== Bibliography ==
- Rhodin, Anders G.J.; van Dijk, Peter Paul; Iverson, John B.; Shaffer, H. Bradley; Roger, Bour (2011-12-31). "Turtles of the World, 2011 update: Annotated checklist of taxonomy, synonymy, distribution and conservation status" (PDF). Chelonian Research Monographs. 6. Archived (PDF) from the original on 2012-01-31.
- Fritz, Uwe; Havaš, Peter (2007-10-31). "Checklist of Chelonians of the World" (PDF). Archived (PDF) from the original on 2011-05-01.
- Caldwell, Analee; Vitt, Laurie. (2008). Herpetology. Waltham, Massachusetts: Academic Press. Print.
- Wagler, J. 1830. Natürliches System der AMPHIBIEN, mit vorangehender Classification der SÄUGTHIERE und VÖGEL. Ein Beitrag zur vergleichenden Zoologie. Munich, Stuttgart and Tübingen: J.G. Cotta. vi + 354 pp. + one plate. (Pelusios, new genus, p. 137). (in German and Latin).
