= August Friedrich Schweigger =

German naturalist (1783–1821)

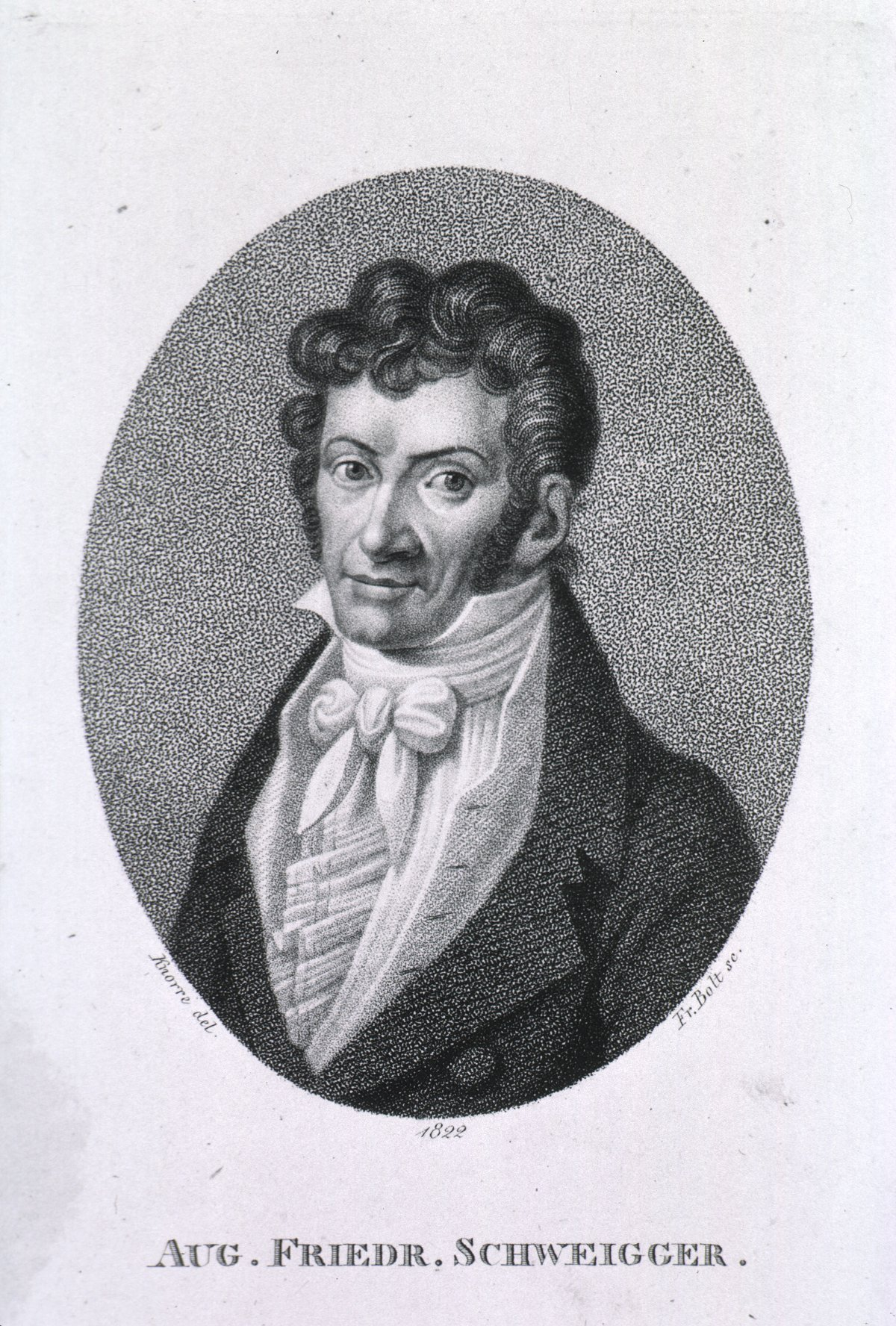
- Born: September 8, 1783
- Died: June 28, 1821 (aged 37)
- Scientific career
- Fields: Natural history

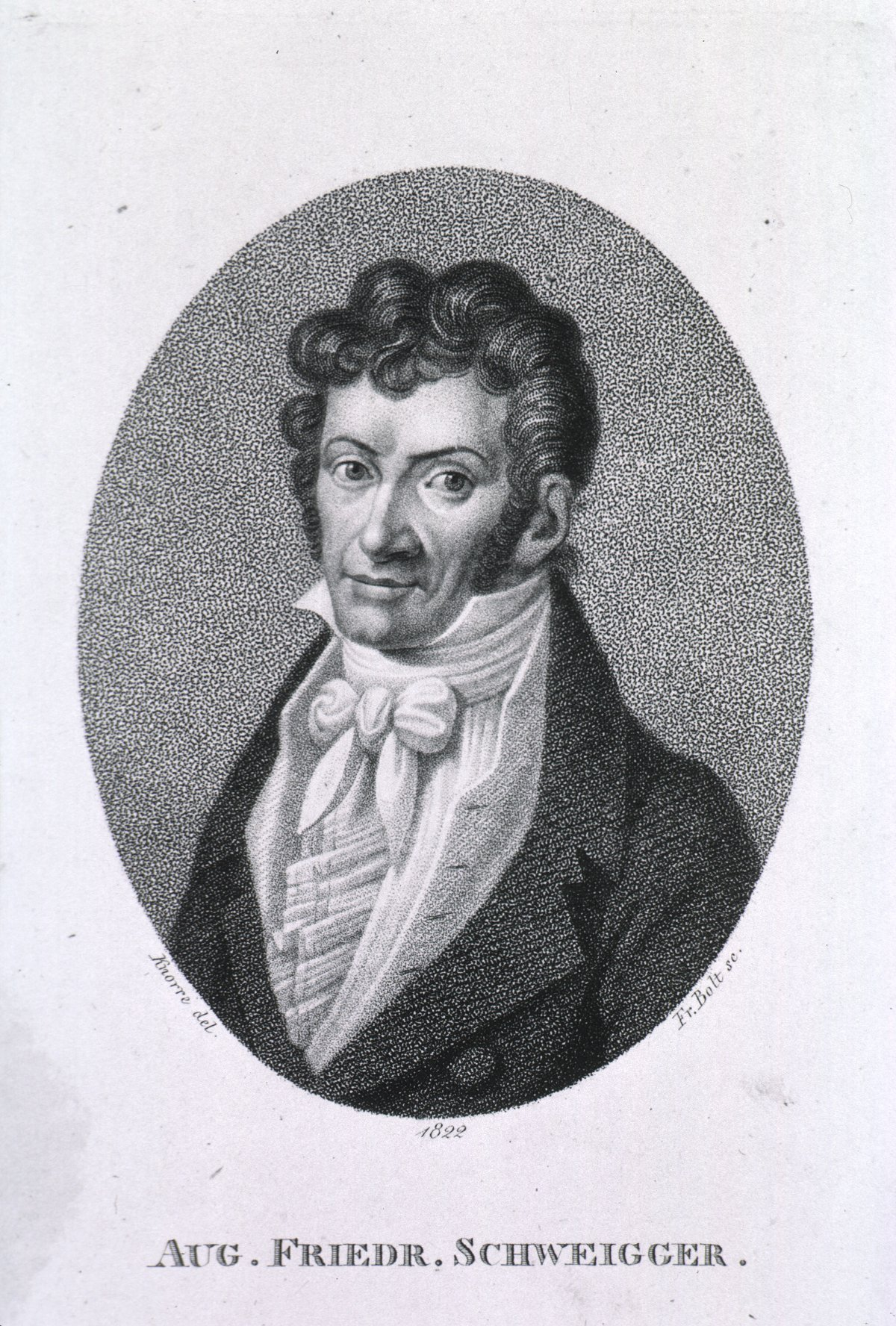
August Friedrich Schweigger

August Friedrich Schweigger (8 September 1783 – 28 June 1821) was a German naturalist born in Erlangen. He was the younger brother of scientist Johann Salomo Christoph Schweigger (1779-1857).

He studied medicine, zoology and botany at Erlangen, and following graduation spent time in Berlin (from 1804) and Paris (from 1806). In 1809 he was appointed professor of botany and medicine at the University of Königsberg. In 1815, he was elected a corresponding member of the Royal Swedish Academy of Sciences. On a research trip to Sicily, he was murdered near Agrigento on 28 June 1821.

The plant genus Schweiggeria from the family Violaceae is named in his honor.

In the scientific field of herpetology, he is best known for his 1812 monograph of turtles, in which he described several new species which are still valid.

== Turtle taxa described by Schweigger ==
Schweigger is the taxonomic authority of Chelydra, a genus of snapping turtles.

In 1812 he described as new species the following 12 species of turtles and tortoises.

- Adanson's mud turtle, Pelusios adansonii
- Aldabra giant tortoise, Geochelone gigantea
- South American river turtle, Podocnemis expansa
- Big-headed Amazon River turtle, Peltocephalus dumerilianus
- Common toad-headed turtle, Mesoclemmys nasuta
- Serrated hinge-back tortoise, Kinixys erosa
- Geoffroy's side-necked turtle, Phrynops geoffroanus
- Gibba turtle, Mesoclemmys gibba
- Indian black turtle, Melanochelys trijuga
- South African bowsprit tortoise, Chersina angulata
- Mediterranean turtle, Mauremys leprosa
- West African mud turtle, Pelusios castaneus

== Selected publications ==
- Specimen flora erlangensis, 1805.
- Kranken- und Armenanstalten in Paris (Medical and charitable institutions in Paris), Bayreuth: Lübeck, 1809.
- Prodromus Monographia Cheloniorum auctore Schweigger. Königsberg. Arch. Naturwiss. Mathem. 1: 271-368, 406-458, 1812.
- Einige Worte über Classification der Thiere, (Treatise on the classification of animals), 1812.
- Prodromi monographiae cheloniorum, 1814.
- Beobachtungen auf naturhistorischen Reisen (Observations on natural history trips). Berlin, 1819.
- Handbuch der Naturgeschichte der skelettlosen ungegliederten Tiere (Textbook of natural history on unsegmented invertebrates). Leipzig, 1820.
- De plantarum classificatione naturalis, 1821.
- "The Life and Herpetological Contributions of August Friedrich Schweigger" (Published in English); Society for the Study of Amphibians and Reptiles, 2008.
