= Sonia Ribes-Beaudemoulin =

French biologist and oceanographer

- Born: 22 November 1953 (age 72); Saint-Pierre, France
- Education: Pierre and Marie-Curie University; Université Aix-Marseille
- Scientific career
- Thesis: La macrofaune vagile associée à la partie vivante des Scléractiniaires sur un récif frangeant de l'Ile de la Réunion (Océan indien) (1978)

Sonia Ribes-Beaudemoulin (born 22 November 1953 in Saint-Pierre) is a French biologist and oceanographer. From 1991 to 2019, she was chief curator of the Réunion Island Natural History Museum. For her work, she was awarded the National Order of Merit.

== Biography ==
Ribes-Beaudemoulin was born in Saint-Pierre on the Réunion Islands (located in the Indian Ocean) and was educated at Roland-Garros high school in Le Tampon and then at Jules-Ferry high school in Paris.

She graduated with a master's degree in animal biology, followed by a DEA in biological oceanography from Pierre and Marie-Curie University. At Aix-Marseille University, she earned a doctorate in biological oceanography. She then returned to Réunion where she taught secondary school mathematics in Saint-Denis (1979-1983) and then natural sciences (1983-1990).

In 1990, she was appointed curator of the Natural History Museum of Réunion in Saint-Denis allowing her to study marine and terrestrial fauna and flora, to the ecology and biodiversity of the Indian Ocean zone, including coral reefs. She also organized exhibitions for the museum, which is home to "more than 42,000 listed pieces – two-thirds of which come from the islands of the western Indian Ocean."

In 2007, Ribes-Beaudemoulin was appointed president of the Scientific Council of the newly created Réunion Marine Nature Reserve. She is also a member of the Scientific Council of the Réunion National Park created the same year and of the Regional Scientific Council for Natural Heritage. She is co-founder of the association Vie Océane (Ocean Life) for the defense of coral reefs, and a member of the departmental commission for nature, landscapes and sites. She also founded the Society for Ornithological Studies of Réunion (SEOR).

She was also responsible for the opening of the Salt Museum in Saint-Leu, a structure which opened in 2007.

Nactus soniae is a species of gecko that was found during one of the expeditions; it was named after Ribes-Beaudemolin.

== Selected works ==
In addition to scientific articles, Ribes-Beaudemoulin writes books for the general public on the terrestrial and marine fauna of Réunion. Selected works include:

- Ribes-Beaudemoulin, Sonia (2007-07-01). "Le muséum d'Histoire naturelle de La Réunion. Vers un muséum de l'insularité". La Lettre de l'OCIM. Musées, Patrimoine et Culture scientifiques et techniques (in French) (112): 22–29. doi:10.4000/ocim.734. ISSN 0994-1908.
- 2002: Underwater Wonders: Reef Life in Reunion, photographs James Caratini and Thierry Soriano (ISBN 2-9519074-0-0)
- 2003: Biodiversity, the living in all its states, an exhibition of the Natural History Museum of Reunion
- 2006: Animals in Creole Gardens, ill. Francois Malbreil. Ocean editions, coll. "Animals of the Mascarenes" (ISBN 2-907064-94-0)
- 2007: Fishes of coral reefs, with Patrick Durville, ill. and photographs Alain Diringer. Ocean editions, coll. "Animals of the Mascarenes" (ISBN 978-2-916533-15-5)
- 2008: Animals of coral reefs. Ocean editions, coll. "Animals of the Mascarenes" (ISBN 978-2-916533-44-5)
- 2008: Biodiversity of Reunion, box of 6 volumes, scientific coordination. Reunion Natural History Museum
- 2016: Chantal Conand, Sonia Ribes-Beaudemoulin, Florence Trentin, Thierry Mulochau and Émilie Boissin, Reunion, Les éditions du Cyclone, 168 p. (ISBN 979-10-94397-04-6).
- 2019: Shellfish, nudibranchs and other molluscs from Reunion. Cyclone Editions
- 2020: Discovering the spiders of Réunion, with Grégory Cazanove. Volcano Editions

== Exhibitions ==
- Animaux des jardins créoles, en collaboration with François Malbreil (2006)
- Poissons des récifs coralliens, en collaboration with Patrick Durville (2006).
- Les animaux des récifs coralliens (2008)
