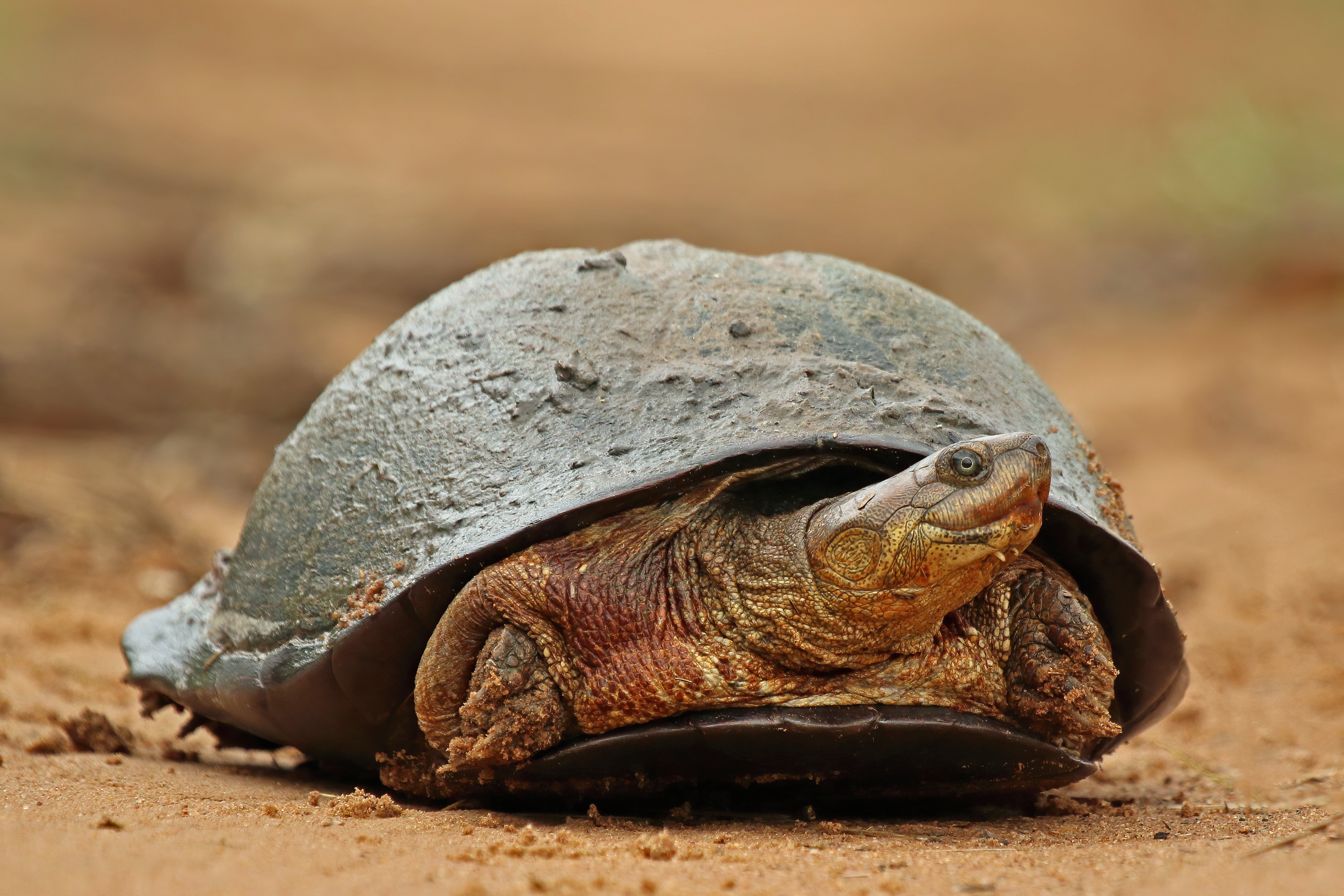
- Pelomedusa subrufa, African helmeted turtle

Scientific classification
- Kingdom: Animalia
- Phylum: Chordata
- Class: Reptilia
- Order: Testudines
- Suborder: Pleurodira
- Hyperfamily: Pelomedusoides
- Family: Pelomedusidae; Cope, 1868

Genera
- Pelomedusa Wagler, 1830; Pelusios Wagler, 1830

Synonyms
- Pelomedusinae Cope, 1868

= Pelomedusidae =

Family of turtles

Alternatively, "Pelomedusidae" may refer to the Pelomedusoidea. See below for details.

Pelomedusidae is a family of freshwater turtles endemic to sub-Saharan Africa, including Madagascar, São Tomé, and the Seychelles (although this population may have been introduced by humans). They range in size from 12 to 45 cm (4.7 to 17.7 in) in carapace length, and are generally roundish in shape. They are unable to fully withdraw their heads into their shells, instead drawing them to the side and folding them beneath the upper edge of their shells, hence are called African side-necked turtles.

The family contains two living genera, Pelomedusa and Pelusios. They are distinguished from their closest relatives by a hinge in the front section of the plastron.

Pelomedusids spends most of their time in the mud at the bottom of rivers or shallow lakes, where they eat invertebrates, such as insects, mollusks, and worms. Many species aestivate through the dry season, burying themselves in the mud. Their average lifespan in the wild is 20 years, but they can live up to 50 years in captivity.

== Systematics and taxonomy ==
Within Pleurodira, Pelomedusidae is more closely related to the South American and Malagasy Podocnemididae than to the South American and Australian Chelidae, with the clade containing both Pelomedusidae and Podocnemididae to the exclusion of Chelidae dubbed Pelomedusoides.

Within Pelomedusidae are 2 genera and 27 extant species.

- Pelomedusa
  - Pelomedusa barbata
  - Pelomedusa galeata
  - Pelomedusa gehafie
  - Pelomedusa kobe
  - Pelomedusa neumanni
  - Pelomedusa olivacea
  - Pelomedusa schweinfurthi
  - Pelomedusa somalica
  - Pelomedusa subrufa
  - Pelomedusa variabilis
- Pelusios
  - Pelusios adansonii
  - Pelusios bechuanicus
  - Pelusios broadleyi
  - Pelusios carinatus
  - Pelusios castaneus
  - Pelusios castanoides
  - Pelusios chapini
  - Pelusios cupulatta
  - Pelusios gabonensis
  - Pelusios marani
  - Pelusios nanus
  - Pelusios niger
  - Pelusios rhodesianus
  - Pelusios sinuatus
  - Pelusios subniger
  - Pelusios upembae
  - Pelusios williamsi

Pelusios seychellensis was originally described as an endemic species to the Seychelles based on Museum specimens from the 19th century. This species was subsequently never found again and thus listed as Extinct by the IUCN, however, mitochondrial evidence proved the specimens to actually be those of P. castaneus, making P. seychellensis an invalid species.
