= Roger Bour =

French herpetologist and taxonomist

Roger Henri Bour
- Born: 9 July 1947; Fontainebleau, France
- Died: 7 March 2020; Villejuif, France
- Known for: Research on turtles (Testudines)
- Scientific career
- Fields: Herpetology
- Workplaces: Muséum national d’histoire naturelle

Roger Henri Bour (9 July 1947 – 7 March 2020) was a French herpetologist. His research focused primarily on turtles (Testudines).

== Biography ==
Roger Bour was born in Fontainebleau, France, the son of Georges Roger Arthur Auguste Bour and Jeanne Ernestine Moreau. He had an older and a younger sister. After attending schools in Houilles, Fontainebleau, Paris, Onzain, and Forbach, he studied zoology and biology at the universities of Nancy and Paris. From 1968 until his retirement in 2017, he worked as a research associate at the Muséum national d’histoire naturelle.

Bour’s research focused on turtles from Brazil, Africa, Madagascar, the Seychelles, and the Mascarene Islands (Mauritius, Réunion, and Rodrigues). In 1973, he described the southern toad-headed turtle (Phrynops tuberculatus vanderhaegei) from the family Chelidae, which was elevated to species status by Peter C. H. Pritchard in 1979 as Phrynops vanderhaegei. In 2005, Bour and Hussam Zaher placed this taxon in the genus Mesoclemmys.

In 1986, 2000, and 2003, he published descriptions of new African species: Pelusios broadleyi, Pelusios marani, and Pelusios cupulatta, all belonging to the family Pelomedusidae. In 2005, he described the Brazilian toad-headed turtle (Mesoclemmys perplexa).

In 2006, Bour and colleagues published a revision of the Hermann’s tortoise, in which the eastern subspecies T. h. robertmertensi was synonymized with the nominate western form Testudo hermanni hermanni. The same paper proposed the genus Eurotestudo, although this name was not accepted.

Bour also worked on extinct species. During the 1980s, he published several scientific papers on extinct turtles from the Seychelles and the Mascarene Islands. In 1994, together with Cécile Mourer-Chauviré, François Moutou, and Sonia Ribes-Beaudemoulin, he described the extinct owl genus Mascarenotus from the Mascarenes. In 1999, with the same co-authors, he described the extinct Réunion rail (Dryolimnas augusti).

In 2003, Bour, together with Jeremy J. Austin and E. Nicholas Arnold, showed that the taxa Dipsochelys dussumieri and Testudo sumeirei are not distinct species but synonyms of the Aldabra giant tortoise (Aldabrachelys gigantea). In 2008, he and Arnold described the extinct skink Leiolopisma ceciliae and the extinct gecko Nactus soniae from Réunion.

Roger Bour was also a member of the editorial board of the German turtle journal Marginata.

== Eponyms ==
In 2023, the fossil turtle species Astrochelys rogerbouri was named in his honor.
