= West African black turtle =

Conservation status
- Near Threatened (IUCN 3.1)

Scientific classification
- Kingdom: Animalia
- Phylum: Chordata
- Class: Reptilia
- Order: Testudines
- Suborder: Pleurodira
- Family: Pelomedusidae
- Genus: Pelusios
- Species: P. niger

Binomial name
- Pelusios niger Duméril and Bibron, 1835

Synonyms
- Sternotherus niger – Duméril & Bibron, 1835; Sternothaerus niger – Gray, 1856; Sternothaerus oxyrhinus – Boulenger, 1897

Species of turtle

The West African black turtle (Pelusios niger) is a species of turtle in the family Pelomedusidae. It is endemic to Africa, in Cameroon, Equatorial Guinea, Gabon, and Nigeria.

== Bibliography ==
- Rhodin, Anders G.J.; van Dijk, Peter Paul; Inverson, John B.; Shaffer, H. Bradley; Roger, Bour (31 December 2011). "Turtles of the world, 2011 update: Annotated checklist of taxonomy, synonymy, distribution and conservation status" (PDF). Chelonian Research Monographs. 6. Archived (PDF) from the original on 31 January 2012.
- Fritz, Uwe; Havaš, Peter (31 October 2007). "Checklist of Chelonians of the World" (PDF). Archived from the original (PDF) on 1 May 2011.
