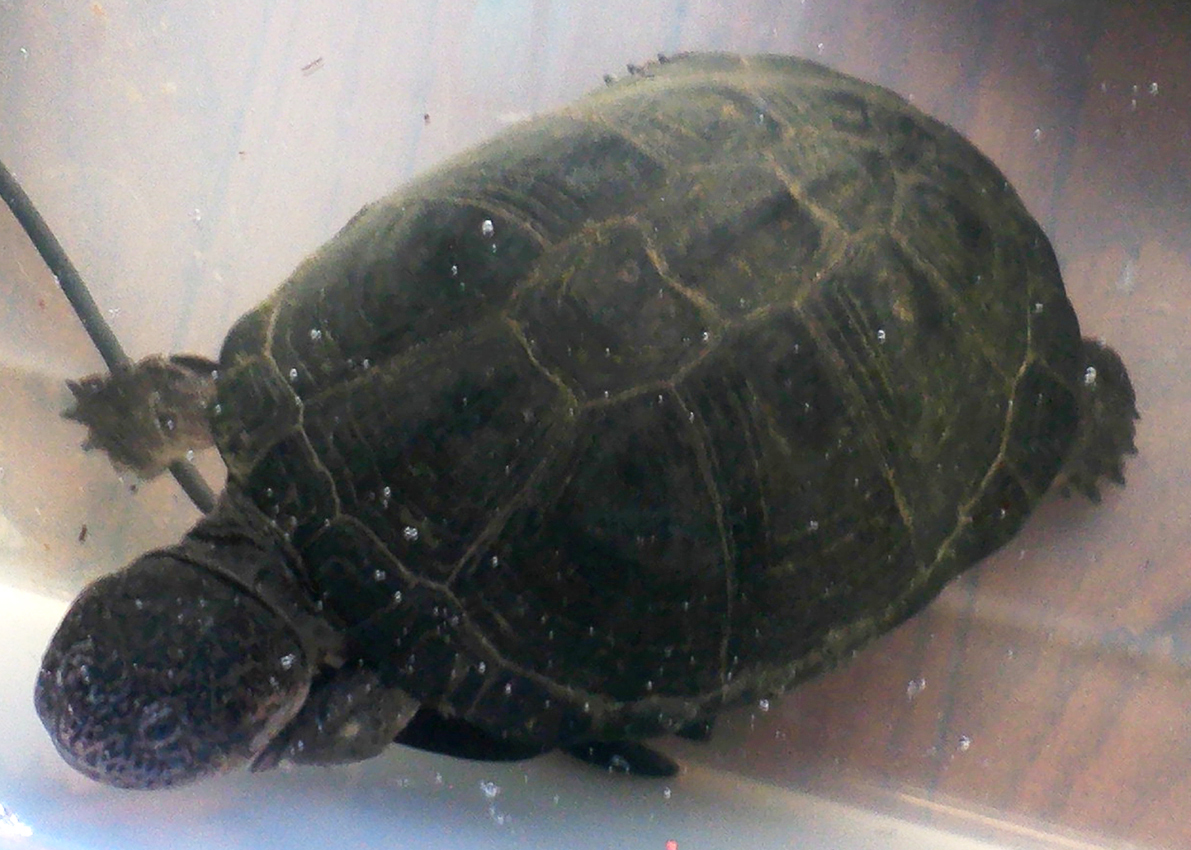

Conservation status
- Least Concern (IUCN 2.3)

Scientific classification
- Kingdom: Animalia
- Phylum: Chordata
- Class: Reptilia
- Order: Testudines
- Suborder: Pleurodira
- Family: Pelomedusidae
- Genus: Pelusios
- Species: P. castaneus

Binomial name
- Pelusios castaneus (Schweigger, 1812)

Synonyms
- Emys castanea Schweigger, 1812; Sternothaerus leachianus Bell, 1825; Pelusios castaneus — Wagler, 1830; Chelys (Sternotherus) castaneus — Gray, 1831; Sternotherus castaneus — Gray, 1831; Sternotherus leachianus — A.M.C. Duméril & Bibron, 1835; Clemmys (Pelusios) castanea — Fitzinger, 1835; Sternotherus derbianus Gray, 1844; Sternothaerus castaneus — Gray, 1856; Sternothaerus derbianus — Gray, 1856; Sternothaerus nigricans castaneus — Siebenrock, 1906; Sternothaerus nigricans var. castanea — Boulenger, 1907; Pelusios derbianus — Schmidt, 1919; Pelusios nigricans castaneus — Hewitt, 1927; Pelusios seychellensis Siebenrock, 1906; Pelusios subniger castaneus — Mertens, 1933; Pelusios castaneus castaneus — Laurent, 1965; Pelusios castaneus derbianus — Laurent, 1965; Pelusios derbyanus Pritchard, 1967 (ex errore)

= West African mud turtle =

Species of turtle

The West African mud turtle (Pelusios castaneus), also known as the West African side-necked turtle or swamp terrapin, is a species of turtle in the family Pelomedusidae. Pelusios castaneus is a freshwater species and is endemic to West and Central Africa.

== Taxonomy ==
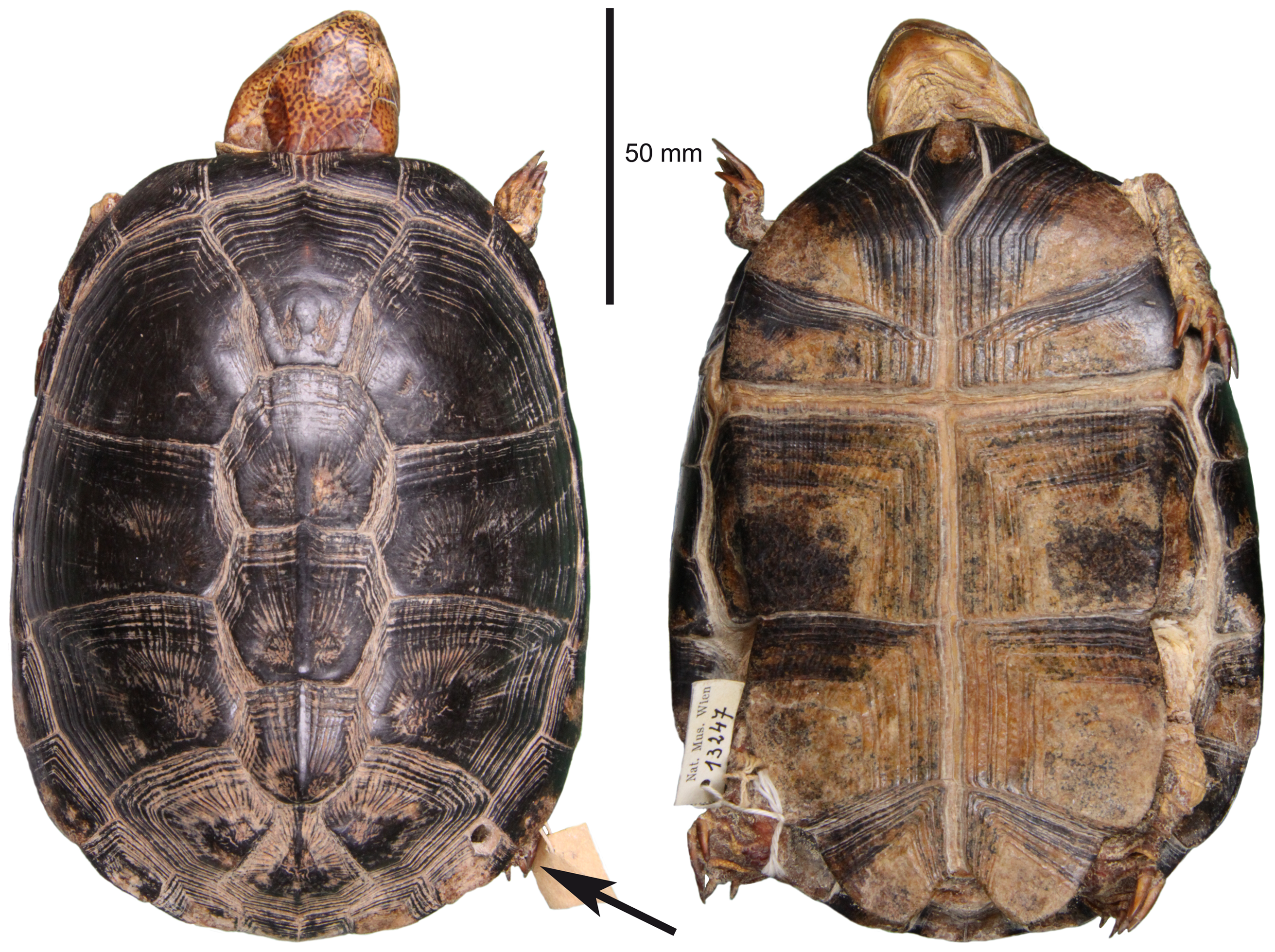
Pelusios seychellensis lectotype

The so-called Seychelles black terrapin, Seychelles mud turtle, or Seychelles terrapin was considered a species of turtle (Pelusios seychellensis) in the family Pelomedusidae, endemic to Seychelles.

Genetic analysis of the lectotype has shown, however, that this turtle was never a separate species, and is in fact Pelusios castaneus. It is possible that specimens were confused in a private collection before being acquired by the Zoological Museum Hamburg in 1901, or else mislabeled there.

== Distribution ==
The West African mud turtle is found in the following countries of West and Central Africa: Angola, Benin, Burkina Faso, Cameroon, Cape Verde, Democratic Republic of the Congo, Republic of the Congo, Equatorial Guinea, Gabon, Ghana, Guinea, Guinea-Bissau, Ivory Coast, Liberia, Mali, Príncipe, Senegal, Sierra Leone, The Gambia, Togo. Additionally, it has been introduced to Guadeloupe.

== Ecology ==
The West African mud turtle is carnivorous and feeds on aquatic prey. There are five phases to feeding; preliminary head fixation on the prey, fine-tuning the head fixation, final approach by the head, grasping of the prey followed by manipulation and transportation, and suction, resulting in ingestion after which the prey is swallowed. The final phase varies according to whether the prey is fast-moving, like a fish, or slow-moving like a gastropod mollusc.

== Bibliography ==
- Rhodin, Anders G.J.; van Dijk, Peter Paul; Iverson, John B.; Shaffer, H. Bradley; Roger, Bour (2011-12-31). "Turtles of the world, 2011 update: Annotated checklist of taxonomy, synonymy, distribution and conservation status" (PDF). Chelonian Research Monographs. 6. Archived (PDF) from the original on 2012-01-31.
- Fritz, Uwe; Havaš, Peter (2007-10-31). "Checklist of Chelonians of the World" (PDF). Archived from the original (PDF) on 2011-05-01.
