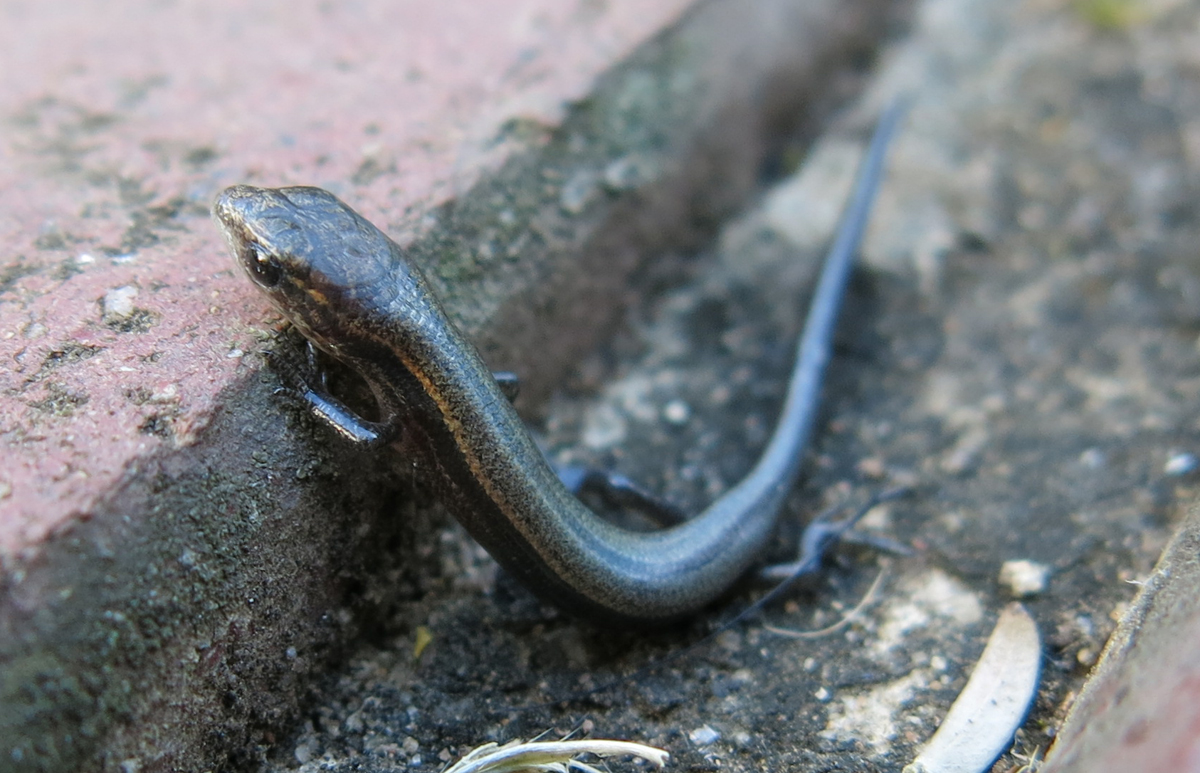
- Panaspis wahlbergii, Wahlberg's snake-eyed skink, Durban, South Africa

Scientific classification
- Kingdom: Animalia
- Phylum: Chordata
- Class: Reptilia
- Order: Squamata
- Family: Scincidae
- Subfamily: Eugongylinae
- Genus: Panaspis; Cope, 1868

Species
- 21 sp., see text

Synonyms
- Afroablepharus

= Panaspis =

Genus of lizards

Panaspis is a genus of skinks, commonly called lidless skinks or snake-eyed skinks, endemic to Sub-Saharan Africa.

== Species ==
The following 22 species, listed alphabetically by specific name, are recognized as being valid:

- Panaspis africana (Gray, 1845) – Guinea lidless skink
- Panaspis annettesabinae Colston, Pyron, & Bauer, 2020 – Sabin's snake-eyed skink
- Panaspis annobonensis (Fuhn, 1972) – Annobón lidless skink
- Panaspis breviceps (W. Peters, 1873) – Peters's lidless skink, short-headed snake-eyed skink
- Panaspis burgeoni (de Witte, 1933)
- Panaspis cabindae (Bocage, 1866) – Cabinda lidless skink, cabinda snake-eyed skink
- Panaspis duruarum (Monard, 1949)
- Panaspis ericae
- Panaspis helleri (Loveridge, 1932)
- Panaspis maculicollis (Jacobsen & Broadley, 2000) – speckle-lipped snake-eyed skink, spotted-neck snake-eyed skink
- Panaspis massaiensis (Angel, 1924) – Maasai snake-eyed skink
- Panaspis megalurus (Nieden, 1913) – blue-tailed snake-eyed skink, Nieden's dwarf skink
- Panaspis mocamedensis Ceríaco, Heinicke, Parker, Marques, & Bauer, 2020 – Moçamedes snake-eyed skink
- Panaspis namibiana Ceríaco, Branch & Bauer, 2018 – Namibian snake-eyed skink
- Panaspis seydeli (de Witte, 1933) – Seydel's snake-eyed skink
- Panaspis tancredii (Boulenger, 1909) – Ethiopian snake-eyed skink
- Panaspis thomensis Ceríaco, Soares, Marques, Bastos-Silveira, Scheinberg, Harris, Brehm & Jesus, 2018 – São Tomé leaf-litter skink
- Panaspis togoensis (F. Werner, 1902) – Togo lidless skink
- Panaspis tristaoi (Monard, 1940) – Nimba snake-eyed skink
- Panaspis tsavoensis Kilunda, Conradie, Wasonga, Jin, Peng, Murphy, Malonza, & Che, 2019 – Tsavo snake-eyed skink
- Panaspis wahlbergii (A. Smith, 1849) – Angolan snake-eyed skink, savannah lidless skink, Wahlberg's snake-eyed skink
- Panaspis wilsoni (F. Werner, 1919) – Wilson's snake-eyed skink

Nota bene: A binomial authority in parentheses indicates that the species was originally described in a genus other than Panaspis.
