= Grauer's cuckooshrike =

Conservation status
- Least Concern (IUCN 3.1)

Scientific classification
- Kingdom: Animalia
- Phylum: Chordata
- Class: Aves
- Order: Passeriformes
- Family: Campephagidae
- Genus: Ceblepyris
- Species: C. graueri

Binomial name
- Ceblepyris graueri (Neumann, 1908)

Synonyms
- Coracina graueri

Species of bird

Grauer's cuckooshrike (Ceblepyris graueri) is a little known species of bird in the family Campephagidae. It is endemic to the Democratic Republic of the Congo. It is found in mid-elevation montane forests, where it can be locally common. Similar to other species endemic to the eastern Democratic Republic of the Congo, it is rarely reported due to ongoing armed conflict in the Albertine Rift.

== Description ==
=== Appearance ===
A slender, medium sized passerine with a relatively long tail and graceful appearance. It's white belly is contrasted by a gray head and gray upperparts, which are a darker slaty gray in the male and a paler gray in the female. It is approximately 22 centimetres (8.7 in) in length.

=== Vocalizations ===
Unknown.

== Taxonomy ==
Grauer's cuckooshrike is part of an African radiation of cuckooshrikes including gray cuckooshrike Ceblepyris caesius, madagascar cuckooshrike C. cinereus, Comoro cuckooshrike C. cucullatus, and white-breasted cuckooshrike C. pectoralis. Grauer's cuckooshrike forms the outgroup to all other mainland African cuckooshrikes.

=== Etymology ===
The name commemorates the German zoologist Rudolf Grauer who collected natural history specimens in the Belgian Congo.

=== Regional Variation ===
Monotypic.

== Distribution and habitat ==
=== Distribution ===
Grauer's cuckooshrike is endemic to the eastern Democratic Republic of the Congo. Reports from the Rwenzoris of Uganda are unsubstantiated and presently considered unconfirmed.

Due to the political instability of the eastern Democratic Republic of the Congo, it is hard to assess the current status and distribution of birds in the region. However, a team from the Wildlife Conservation Society reported in 2013 that Grauer's Cuckoshrike "was particularly abundant" in the Kisimba-Ikobo Community Reserve, but they were "attacked by people antagonistic to the reserve". Grauer's cuckooshrike is known from other protected areas, such as Kahuzi-Biega National Park, but there are few (if any) recent records from these regions.

=== Habitat ===
This species is known from montane forest and other high elevation forested habitats in the eastern Democratic Republic of the Congo. Of the 51 specimens included in a recent study, all were from only 5 mountain ranges in the eastern Democratic Republic of the Congo, with an altitudinal range of 1140-1900 m 1,140–1,900 metres (3,740–6,230 ft). The species is generally found at intermediate elevations between the lower-elevation blue cuckooshrike Cyanograucalus azureus and the higher-elevation gray cuckooshrike.

== Behavior ==
=== Foraging and General Behavior ===
Not much is known of the behavior of this species, and it is presumably similar to its congeners.

=== Reproduction ===
Lays eggs at the end of the rainy seasons, with reports from January, May, and June. Not much is known regarding the breeding behavior of this species, and more research is required.

== Conservation ==
This species is considered Least Concern. More studies and surveys are required to assess its current status, but these are impractical given security concerns within much of this species' range. It is potentially threatened by climate change, and it has not been recently reported from some areas where it was previously known. Other threats include deforestation.
