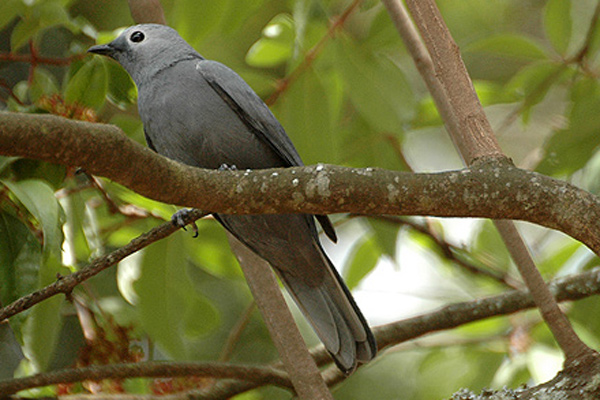

Conservation status
- Least Concern (IUCN 3.1)

Scientific classification
- Kingdom: Animalia
- Phylum: Chordata
- Class: Aves
- Order: Passeriformes
- Family: Campephagidae
- Genus: Ceblepyris
- Species: C. caesius

Binomial name
- Ceblepyris caesius Lichtenstein, MHC, 1823

= Grey cuckooshrike =

Species of bird

The grey cuckooshrike (Ceblepyris caesius) is a species of bird in the cuckooshrike family Campephagidae. It is a medium-sized forest bird, with grey to blue-grey plumage and large black eyes. There are two subspecies that occur in forest patches of southern and central Africa respectively.

== Taxonomy ==
The grey cuckooshrike belongs to the family Campephagidae of the old world songbirds. There are almost 90 species within Campephagidae that occur in Africa, Asia and Australasia. Ceblepyris caesia is often considered to be part of a superspecies with the white-breasted cuckooshrike (Ceblepyris pectoralis); which looks somewhat similar apart from the striking white underparts compared to C. caesia's grey underparts. The grey cuckooshrike is also found at higher elevation than its white-breasted counterpart. A 2010 genetic analysis confirmed the two species as each other's closest relatives, with their common ancestor diverging from the ancestor of Grauer's cuckooshrike.

"Grey cuckooshrike" has been designated the official name by the International Ornithologists' Union (IOC). The species is also commonly referred to as the mountain grey cuckooshrike and the African grey cuckooshrike. South African names include usinga in Pirie Forest, umsimpofu in Elliotdale and around the mouth of the Mthatha River, and umswinkobe in eastern Pondoland.

=== Subspecies ===
There are two subspecies of C. caesius that are native to sub-Saharan Africa. The only known variation between these subspecies is their size. C. c. caesius was first described in the Eastern Cape, South Africa, in 1823 by M. H. C. Lichtenstein and occurs in patches of South Africa, Mozambique and Zimbabwe. C. c. pura described in 1891 occurs in south-eastern parts of Nigeria, western parts of Cameroon, Equatorial Guinea, Ethiopia, eastern parts of South Sudan, north-eastern parts of DRC, Malawi and north-western parts of Mozambique.

== Description ==
The grey cuckooshrike is a medium-sized bird; with a body length of 25–27 cm (10–10.5 in) and weighing between 53–68 g (1.9–2.4 oz). These birds exhibit sexual dimorphism. They both have a blue-grey head and body, with a large jet-black eye with a thin white eye-ring. Their bill and legs are black, and the males have a dark grey loreal patch, while females have grey loreal patches and are a slightly lighter shade of grey. The juveniles are a dark brown with grey-white barring above, white underparts with brown barring, and have black tails with white edges on the tips as well as on their flight feathers.

== Habitat and movements ==
The preferred habitat of the grey cuckooshrike is Afromontane forests, lowland forests, coastal forests and dense woodland areas near rivers. They have also been observed foraging in pine and wattle plantations and trees in the trees of small towns in winter. They usually occur at elevations above 1,000 metres (3,300 ft) in West Africa and 1,500–3,000 metres (4,900–9,800 ft) in Central and East Africa, but also frequent coastal areas below 900 metres (3,000 ft) in East Africa. In Zimbabwe and South Africa they are found at 1,200 metres (3,900 ft) or lower elevations.

They are largely resident species but do undertake post-breeding movementsa during the dry season. In the Cameroon, migration to lower elevations has been recorded after the breeding season. In South Africa, the birds migrate from forests in the Northern highveld to forests in the lowveld. They are frequent visitors to eastern and Western Cape coastal areas in the winter.

== Behaviour and ecology ==
=== Feeding ===
The grey cuckooshrike is insectivorous; feeding mostly on crickets, caterpillars and locusts. Spiders, winged termites and beetles also form a part of their diet. They forage in the upper forest canopy, looking for insects in the foliage and on tree trunks. They hop on branches and examine the underside of the leaves above for insects, when they see one they snatch the prey and return to their perch before eating it.

=== Breeding ===
In Southern Africa, breeding occurs in the summer months between October and January, and nest building has been recorded as early as September in the most southern parts of South Africa. The central African subspecies breeds during the rainy season, but avoids the wettest periods.

Breeding periods of grey cuckooshrike in various African countries
| Country | Breeding months |
|---|---|
| Cameroon | Nov |
| DRC | Jan–Jun and Aug |
| Ethiopia | Feb–Mar |
| Kenya | Jan–Mar; Aug, Oct and Dec |
| Malawi | Sept |
| Sudan | Aug and Dec |
| Tanzania | Jan–Mar; Aug, Oct and Dec |
| Uganda | Jan–Mar; Aug, Oct and Dec |

Their nests are a shallow bowl shape and constructed by both sexes from Usnea lichen and spider webs, perched 17 to 20 meters up in trees on the forest edge. The clutch size is one or two eggs which are an oval shape and pale bluish-green with olive and brown spots. The chicks are black with grey down when they hatch, and remain in the nest until the following breeding season. Both the male and female incubate the eggs, but little else is known about the incubation or fledging periods. They are monogamous breeders and will stay in that pair until one dies; and the surviving individual will seek a new mate.

=== Social behaviour and calls ===
The grey cuckooshrike is somewhat inconspicuous, making observations about its behaviour challenging. They are usually observed alone or in pairs and less frequently in small groups of up to 7 individuals. During the non-breeding season they have been seen foraging in mixed species flocks. Their flight is described as "slow and level with heavy wing beats".

These are relatively quiet birds, their call is described as a faint, high-pitched "tseeeeep" while foraging and a "seeeeea" call at their nests. Other calls include a weaver-like chatter and sneeze-like "chi-ooo" sounds.

== Relationship with humans ==
The International Union for Conservation of Nature (IUCN) red list has rated the grey cuckooshrike as least concern, indicating it is not threatened. Population size is unknown but is thought to be decreasing due to deforestation. Population density in the Mpumalanga province of South Africa was calculated to be around six individuals per 4.5 hectares (11 acres). They are not considered to be common or easily spotted, this is partly due to them living in the forest canopy and partly due to their inconspicuous nature. They are tolerant of humans, and have been spotted in trees of urban areas and residential gardens.
