= Blue-tailed skink =

Blue-tailed skink may refer to:

- Cryptoblepharus egeriae, a lizard native to Australia's Christmas Island
- Plestiodon elegans, the five-striped blue-tailed skink, a lizard found in East-Asia
- Plestiodon fasciatus, the five-lined skink of North America
- Trachylepis margaritifera, the rainbow mabuya of Africa
- Trachylepis quinquetaeniata, the five-lined mabuya of Africa (also present in Florida as an invasive non-native species)
- Panaspis megalurus, the blue-tailed snake-eyed skink of Tanzania
