= Annobón lidless skink =

Conservation status
- Data Deficient (IUCN 3.1)

Scientific classification
- Kingdom: Animalia
- Phylum: Chordata
- Class: Reptilia
- Order: Squamata
- Family: Scincidae
- Genus: Panaspis
- Species: P. annobonensis

Binomial name
- Panaspis annobonensis (Fuhn, 1972)
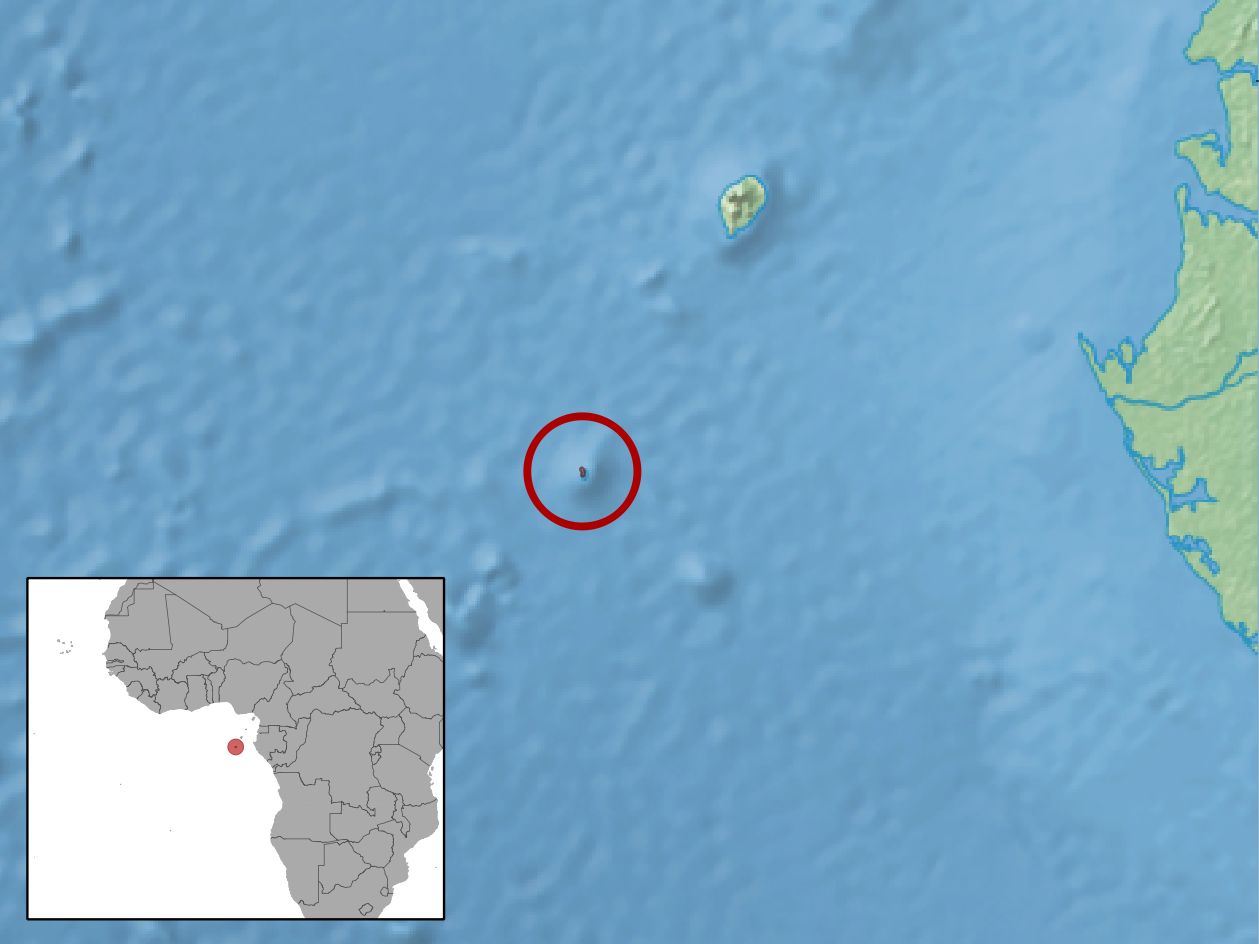
- Geographic distribution of the Annobón lidless skink (Panaspis annobonensis)

Synonyms
- Panaspis africana annobonensis; Leptosiaphos annobonensis; Afroablepharus annobonensis

Species of lizard

The Annobón lidless skink (Panaspis annobonensis) is a species of lidless skinks in the family Scincidae. The species is endemic to the island of Annobón in Equatorial Guinea and is listed as critically endangered by the IUCN. The species was first described as in 1972.

It is threatened by the loss of natural habitat and by the introduction of predatory species.
