= Leptosiaphos hackarsi =

Conservation status
- Endangered (IUCN 3.1)

Scientific classification
- Kingdom: Animalia
- Phylum: Chordata
- Class: Reptilia
- Order: Squamata
- Family: Scincidae
- Genus: Leptosiaphos
- Species: L. hackarsi

Binomial name
- Leptosiaphos hackarsi (de Witte, 1941)

Synonyms
- Lygosoma meleagris hackarsi de Witte, 1941; Panaspis (Leptosiaphos) hackarsi — Brygoo, 1985; Leptosiaphos hackarsi — Broadley, 1998

Species of lizard

Leptosiaphos hackarsi, also known commonly as Hackars' five toed skink or Hackars's five-toed skink, is an endangered species of lizard in the family Scincidae. The species is native to central Africa.

== Etymology ==
The specific name, hackarsi, is in honor of Belgian administrator Henri-Martin Hackars (1881–1940).

== Geographic range ==
L. hackarsi is found in eastern Democratic Republic of the Congo, northern Rwanda, and southwestern Uganda.

== Habitat ==
The preferred natural habitat of L. hackarsi is savanna.

== Behavior ==
L. hackarsi is diurnal, terrestrial, and semi-fossorial.

== Diet ==
L. hackarsi preys upon small arthropods.

== Reproduction ==
L. hackarsi is oviparous.
