= Proablepharus tenuis =

Conservation status
- Least Concern (IUCN 3.1)

Scientific classification
- Kingdom: Animalia
- Phylum: Chordata
- Class: Reptilia
- Order: Squamata
- Family: Scincidae
- Genus: Proablepharus
- Species: P. tenuis

Binomial name
- Proablepharus tenuis (Broom, 1896)

Synonyms
- Ablepharus tenuis Broom, 1896; Ablepharus broomensis Lönnberg & Andersson, 1913; Ablepharus davisi Copland, 1952; Proablepharus tenuis — Fuhn, 1969

Species of lizard

Proablepharus tenuis, also known commonly as Broom's small skink and the northern soil-crevice skink, is a species of skink, a lizard in the family Scincidae. The species is endemic to Australia.

== Geographic range ==
Within Australia, P. tenuis is found in northern Northern Territory, northern Queensland, and northern Western Australia.

== Habitat ==
The preferred natural habitats of P. tenuis are forest and savanna.

== Reproduction ==
P. tenuis is oviparous.
