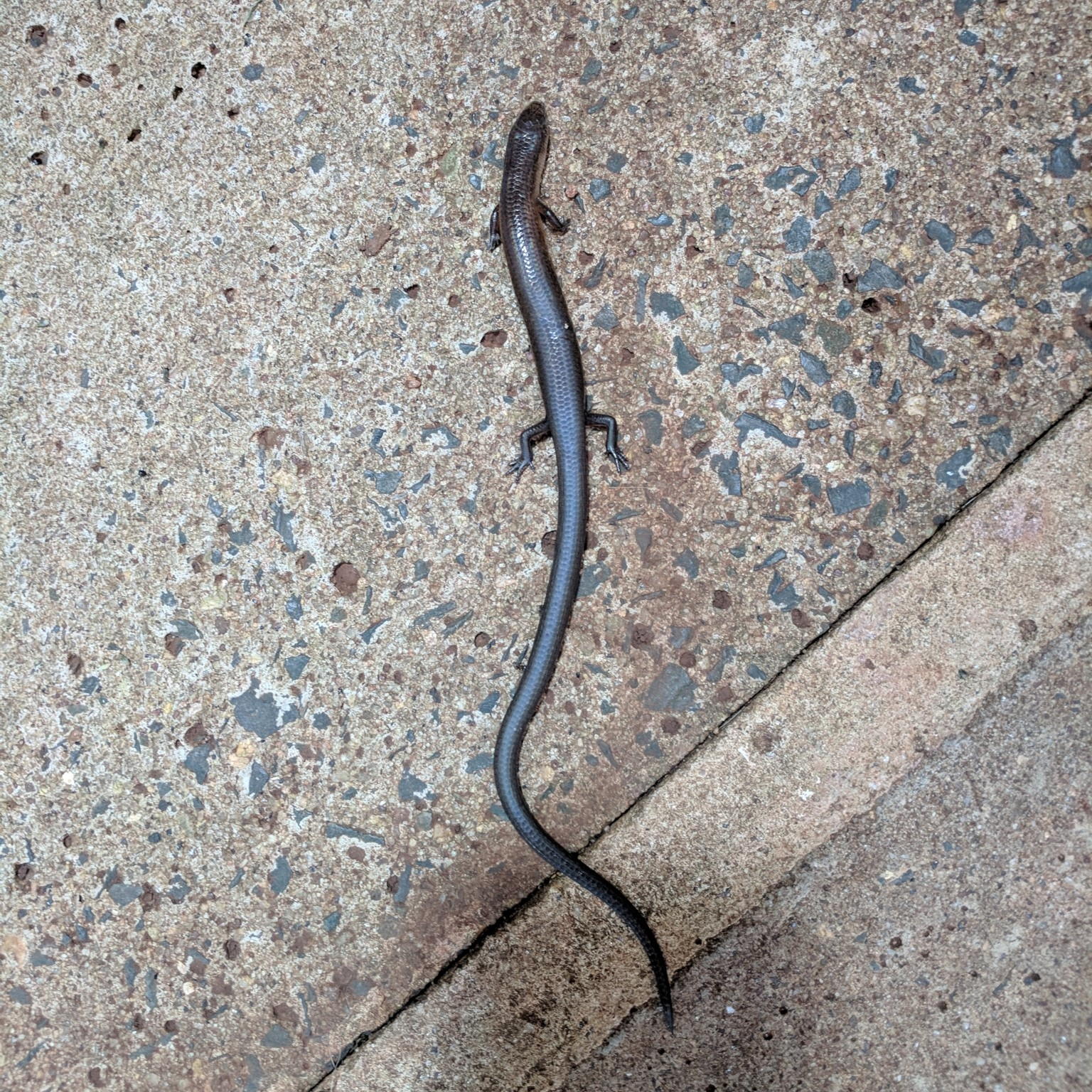
- Leptosiaphos kilimensis

Scientific classification
- Kingdom: Animalia
- Phylum: Chordata
- Class: Reptilia
- Order: Squamata
- Family: Scincidae
- Subfamily: Eugongylinae
- Genus: Leptosiaphos; K.P. Schmidt, 1943

= Leptosiaphos =

Genus of lizards

Leptosiaphos is a genus of skinks endemic to West Africa.

== Species ==
The following 18 species are recognized:

- Leptosiaphos aloysiisabaudiae (Peracca, 1907) – Uganda five-toed skink
- Leptosiaphos amieti (Perret, 1973) – Cameroon five-toed skink
- Leptosiaphos blochmanni (Tornier, 1903) – Zaire three-toed skink
- Leptosiaphos dewittei (Loveridge, 1934) – De Witte's leaf-litter skink, De Witte's five-toed skink
- Leptosiaphos dungeri J.-F. Trape, 2012
- Leptosiaphos fuhni (Perret, 1973) – Fuhn's five-toed skink
- Leptosiaphos graueri (Sternfeld, 1912) – Rwanda five-toed skink
- Leptosiaphos hackarsi (de Witte, 1941) – Hackars's five-toed skink
- Leptosiaphos hylophilus Laurent, 1982 – Laurenti's five-toed skink
- Leptosiaphos ianthinoxantha (Böhme, 1975) – yellow and violet-bellied mountain skink
- Leptosiaphos kilimensis (Stejneger, 1891) – Kilimanjaro five-toed skink
- Leptosiaphos koutoui Ineich, Schmitz, Chirio & LeBreton, 2004
- Leptosiaphos luberoensis (de Witte, 1933) – Witte's five-toed skink
- Leptosiaphos meleagris (Boulenger, 1907) – Ruwenzori four-toed skink
- Leptosiaphos pauliani (Angel, 1940)
- Leptosiaphos rhodurus Laurent, 1952 – red five-toed skink
- Leptosiaphos rhomboidalis Broadley, 1989 – Udzungwa five-toed skink
- Leptosiaphos vigintiserierum (Sjöstedt, 1897) – African five-toed skink

Nota bene: A binomial authority in parentheses indicates that the species was originally described in a genus other than Leptosiaphos.
