= Panaspis seydeli =

Conservation status
- Data Deficient (IUCN 3.1)

Scientific classification
- Kingdom: Animalia
- Phylum: Chordata
- Class: Reptilia
- Order: Squamata
- Family: Scincidae
- Genus: Panaspis
- Species: P. seydeli

Binomial name
- Panaspis seydeli (de Witte, 1933)

Synonyms
- Ablepharus seydeli de Witte, 1933; Ablepharus moeruensis de Witte, 1933; Ablepharus smithii de Witte, 1936; Afroablepharus seydeli — Greer, 1974; Panaspis seydeli — Broadley & Cotterill, 2004

Species of lizard

Panaspis seydeli, also known as the Seydel's snake-eyed skink, is a species of lidless skink, a lizard in the family Scincidae. The species is known from the Democratic Republic of the Congo and Zambia.

== Etymology ==
The specific name, seydeli, is in honor of Belgian lepidopterist Charles Henri Victor Seydel (1873–1960).

== Geographic range ==
P. seydeli is found in the southeastern Democratic Republic of the Congo and northern Zambia.
