= Panaspis burgeoni =

Conservation status
- Least Concern (IUCN 3.1)

Scientific classification
- Kingdom: Animalia
- Phylum: Chordata
- Class: Reptilia
- Order: Squamata
- Family: Scincidae
- Genus: Panaspis
- Species: P. burgeoni

Binomial name
- Panaspis burgeoni (de Witte, 1933)

Synonyms
- Lygosoma (Siaphos) burgeoni de Witte, 1933; Lygosoma (Leptosiaphos) burgeoni — Schmidt, 1943; Panaspis burgeoni — Welch, 1982

Species of lizard

Panaspis burgeoni is a species of lidless skink, a lizard in the family Scincidae. The species is endemic to the Democratic Republic of the Congo.

== Etymology ==
The specific name, burgeoni, is in honor of Belgian entomologist Louis Burgeon.

== Geographic range ==
Within the Democratic Republic of the Congo, P. burgeoni is found in foothills east of the Ruwenzori Mountains.

== Habitat ==
The preferred natural habitat of P. burgeoni is forest, at altitudes around 2,500 m (8,200 ft).

== Behavior ==
P. burgeoni is terrestrial, living in the leaf litter of the forest.

== Reproduction ==
P. burgeoni is oviparous.
