= Proablepharus =

Scientific classification
- Kingdom: Animalia
- Phylum: Chordata
- Class: Reptilia
- Order: Squamata
- Family: Scincidae
- Subfamily: Eugongylinae
- Genus: Proablepharus; Fuhn, 1969

Genus of lizards

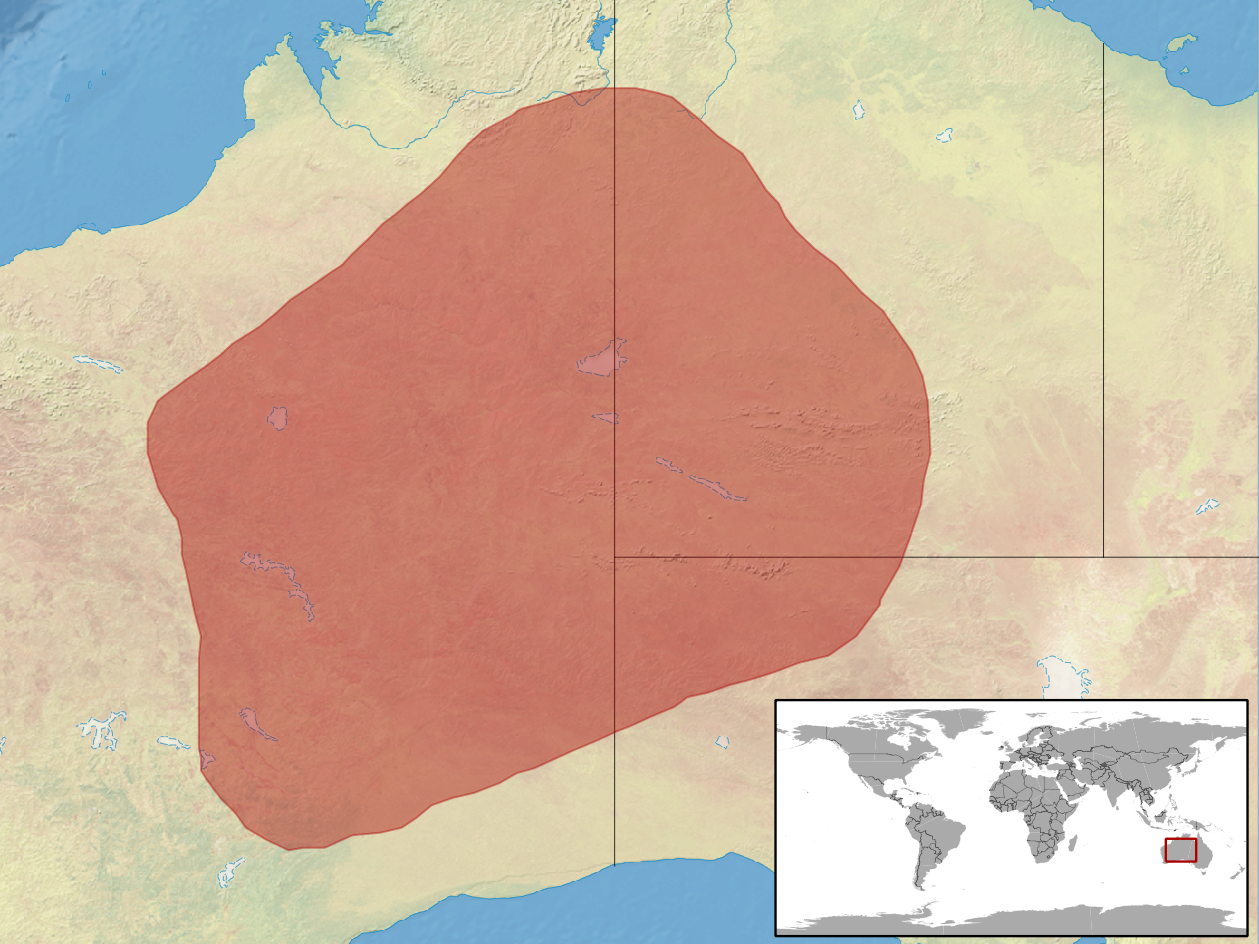
Geographic distribution of Proablepharus reginae

Proablepharus is a genus of lizards in the subfamily Eugongylinae of the family Scincidae. The genus is endemic to Australia.

== Species ==
Two species are recognized as being valid.

- Proablepharus reginae (Glauert, 1960) – western soil-crevice skink
- Proablepharus tenuis (Broom, 1896) – Broom's small skink, northern soil-crevice skink
