= Panaspis massaiensis =

Scientific classification
- Kingdom: Animalia
- Phylum: Chordata
- Class: Reptilia
- Order: Squamata
- Family: Scincidae
- Genus: Panaspis
- Species: P. massaiensis

Binomial name
- Panaspis massaiensis (Angel, 1924)

Synonyms
- Ablepharus Massaïensis Angel, 1924

Species of lizard

Panaspis massaiensis, also known as the Maasai snake-eyed skink, is a species of lidless skinks in the family Scincidae. It is found in Kenya and Tanzania. Until its revalidation in 2019, it was considered of synonym of Panaspis wahlbergi.

Panaspis massaiensis is a small skink measuring on average 39 mm (1.5 in) in snout–vent length. It inhabits moist savanna in lowland and highland areas, from sea level to 2,000 m (6,600 ft) above sea level.
