= Leptosiaphos luberoensis =

Scientific classification
- Kingdom: Animalia
- Phylum: Chordata
- Class: Reptilia
- Order: Squamata
- Family: Scincidae
- Genus: Leptosiaphos
- Species: L. luberoensis

Binomial name
- Leptosiaphos luberoensis (de Witte, 1933)

Species of lizard

Leptosiaphos luberoensis, Witte's five-toed skink, is a species of lizard in the family Scincidae. It is found in the Democratic Republic of the Congo.
