= Leptosiaphos ianthinoxantha =

Conservation status
- Vulnerable (IUCN 3.1)

Scientific classification
- Kingdom: Animalia
- Phylum: Chordata
- Class: Reptilia
- Order: Squamata
- Family: Scincidae
- Genus: Leptosiaphos
- Species: L. ianthinoxantha

Binomial name
- Leptosiaphos ianthinoxantha (Böhme, 1975)

Species of lizard

Leptosiaphos ianthinoxantha, the yellow and violet-bellied mountain skink, is a species of lizard in the family Scincidae. It is found in Cameroon.
