= Panaspis wilsoni =

Conservation status
- Data Deficient (IUCN 3.1)

Scientific classification
- Kingdom: Animalia
- Phylum: Chordata
- Class: Reptilia
- Order: Squamata
- Family: Scincidae
- Genus: Panaspis
- Species: P. wilsoni

Binomial name
- Panaspis wilsoni (F. Werner, 1914)

Synonyms
- Ablepharus wilsoni F. Werner, 1914; Afroablepharus wilsoni — Greer, 1974; Panaspis wilsoni — Medina et al., 2016

Sudanese snake-eyed skink

Panaspis wilsoni, also known commonly as Wilson's dwarf skink and Wilson's snake-eyed skink, is a species of lidless skink, a lizard in the family Scincidae. The species is endemic to Sudan.

== Etymology ==
The specific name, wilsoni, is in honor of Arnold Talbot Wilson, who was a British military officer, diplomat, and amateur naturalist.

== Geographic range ==
P. wilsoni is found in southern Sudan.

== Habitat ==
The preferred natural habitat of P. wilsoni is unknown.

== Description ==
P. wilsoni has a maximum snout–vent length (SVL) of about 25 mm (0.98 in), making it one of the smallest skinks known.

== Reproduction ==
The mode of reproduction of P. wilsoni is unknown.
