= Panaspis cabindae =

Conservation status
- Least Concern (IUCN 3.1)

Scientific classification
- Kingdom: Animalia
- Phylum: Chordata
- Class: Reptilia
- Order: Squamata
- Family: Scincidae
- Genus: Panaspis
- Species: P. cabindae

Binomial name
- Panaspis cabindae (Bocage, 1866)
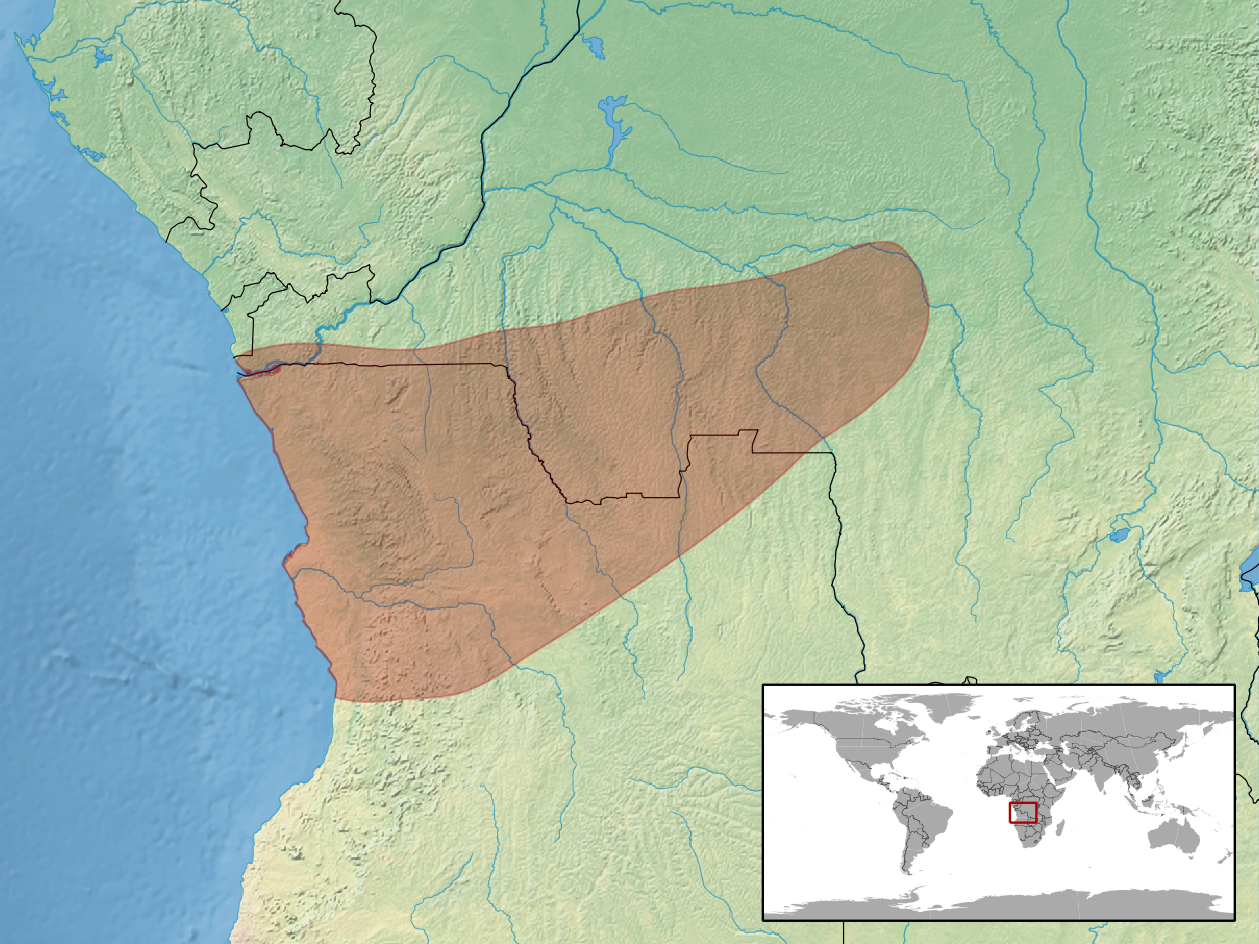

Species of lizard

Panaspis cabindae, Cabinda snake-eyed skink or Cabinda lidless skink, is a species of lidless skink in the family Scincidae. The species is found in the Democratic Republic of the Congo and Angola. It has been observed in forb-dominated savannas. It has been recorded from settlements, open areas and disturbed habitats.
