= Panaspis namibiana =

Scientific classification
- Kingdom: Animalia
- Phylum: Chordata
- Class: Reptilia
- Order: Squamata
- Family: Scincidae
- Genus: Panaspis
- Species: P. namibiana

Binomial name
- Panaspis namibiana Ceríaco, Branch, & Bauer, 2018

Species of lizard

The Namibian snake-eyed skink (Panaspis namibiana) is a species of lidless skinks in the family Scincidae. The species is found in Namibia and Angola.
