= Leptosiaphos rhomboidalis =

Conservation status
- Data Deficient (IUCN 3.1)

Scientific classification
- Kingdom: Animalia
- Phylum: Chordata
- Class: Reptilia
- Order: Squamata
- Suborder: Scinciformata
- Infraorder: Scincomorpha
- Family: Eugongylidae
- Genus: Leptosiaphos
- Species: L. rhomboidalis

Binomial name
- Leptosiaphos rhomboidalis Broadley, 1989

Species of lizard

Leptosiaphos rhomboidalis, the Udzungwa five-toed skink, is a species of lizard in the family Scincidae. It is found in Tanzania.
