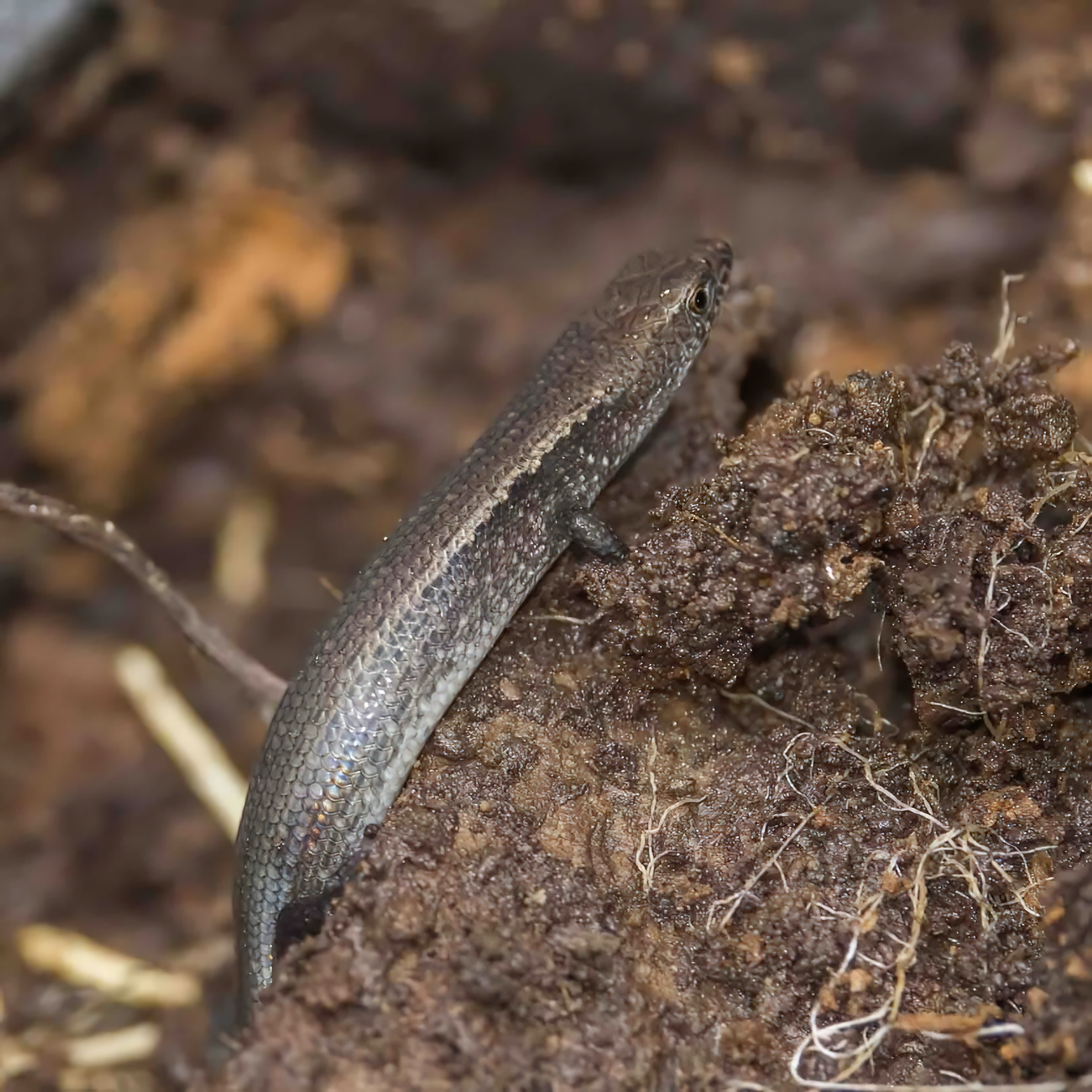

Scientific classification
- Kingdom: Animalia
- Phylum: Chordata
- Class: Reptilia
- Order: Squamata
- Family: Scincidae
- Genus: Panaspis
- Species: P. thomensis

Binomial name
- Panaspis thomensis Ceríaco, Soares, Marques, Bastos-Silveira, Scheinberg, Harris, Brehm, & Jesus, 2018

= Panaspis thomensis =

Species of lizard

Panaspis thomensis, the São Tomé leaf-litter skink, is a species of lidless skinks in the family Scincidae. The species is found on São Tomé.
