= Leptosiaphos graueri =

Conservation status
- Endangered (IUCN 3.1)

Scientific classification
- Kingdom: Animalia
- Phylum: Chordata
- Class: Reptilia
- Order: Squamata
- Family: Scincidae
- Genus: Leptosiaphos
- Species: L. graueri

Binomial name
- Leptosiaphos graueri (Sternfeld, 1912)

Synonyms
- Lygosoma graueri Sternfeld, 1912; Siaphos graueri — Loveridge, 1936; Lygosoma (Leptosiaphos) graueri — Schmidt, 1943; Leptosiaphos (Leptosiaphos) graueri — Mittleman, 1952; Panaspis graueri — Greer, 1974; Leptosiaphos graueri — Broadley, 1998

Species of lizard

Leptosiaphos graueri, also known commonly as the Rwanda five-toed skink, is a species of lizard in the family Scincidae. The species is endemic to Africa.

== Etymology ==
The specific name, graueri, is in honor of Rudolf Grauer, who was an Austrian zoologist and explorer.

== Geographic range ==
L. graueri is found in Burundi, eastern Democratic Republic of the Congo, Rwanda, and Uganda.

== Habitat ==
The preferred natural habitat of L. graueri is forest at altitudes up to 3,100 m (10,170 ft).

== Behavior ==
L. graueri is diurnal and fossorial.

== Diet ==
L. graueri preys upon insects.

== Reproduction ==
L. graueri is oviparous. Clutch size is two eggs.
