= Leptosiaphos vigintiserierum =

Conservation status
- Near Threatened (IUCN 3.1)

Scientific classification
- Kingdom: Animalia
- Phylum: Chordata
- Class: Reptilia
- Order: Squamata
- Suborder: Scinciformata
- Infraorder: Scincomorpha
- Family: Eugongylidae
- Genus: Leptosiaphos
- Species: L. vigintiserierum

Binomial name
- Leptosiaphos vigintiserierum (Sjöstedt, 1897)

Synonyms
- Lygosoma vigintiserierum Sjöstedt, 1897

Species of lizard

Leptosiaphos vigintiserierum, also known as the African five-toed skink, is a species of lizard in the family Scincidae. It is found in Cameroon and Equatorial Guinea (Bioko).
