= Cryptoblepharus fuhni =

Conservation status
- Least Concern (IUCN 3.1)

Scientific classification
- Kingdom: Animalia
- Phylum: Chordata
- Class: Reptilia
- Order: Squamata
- Family: Scincidae
- Genus: Cryptoblepharus
- Species: C. fuhni

Binomial name
- Cryptoblepharus fuhni Covacevich & Ingram, 1978

Species of lizard

Cryptoblepharus fuhni, also known commonly as the black-boulder shinning-skink, is a species of lizard in the family Scincidae. The species is endemic to Queensland in Australia.

== Etymology ==
The specific name, fuhni, is in honor of Romanian herpetologist Ion Eduard Fuhn.

== Description ==
Large for its genus and long-legged for its genus, C. fuhni may attain a snout-to-vent length of 5 cm (2.0 in).

== Habitat ==
The preferred natural habitat of C. fuhni is black granite boulders.

== Reproduction ==
C. fuhni is oviparous.
