= Leptosiaphos aloysiisabaudiae =

Conservation status
- Least Concern (IUCN 3.1)

Scientific classification
- Kingdom: Animalia
- Phylum: Chordata
- Class: Reptilia
- Order: Squamata
- Family: Scincidae
- Genus: Leptosiaphos
- Species: L. aloysiisabaudiae

Binomial name
- Leptosiaphos aloysiisabaudiae (Peracca, 1907)
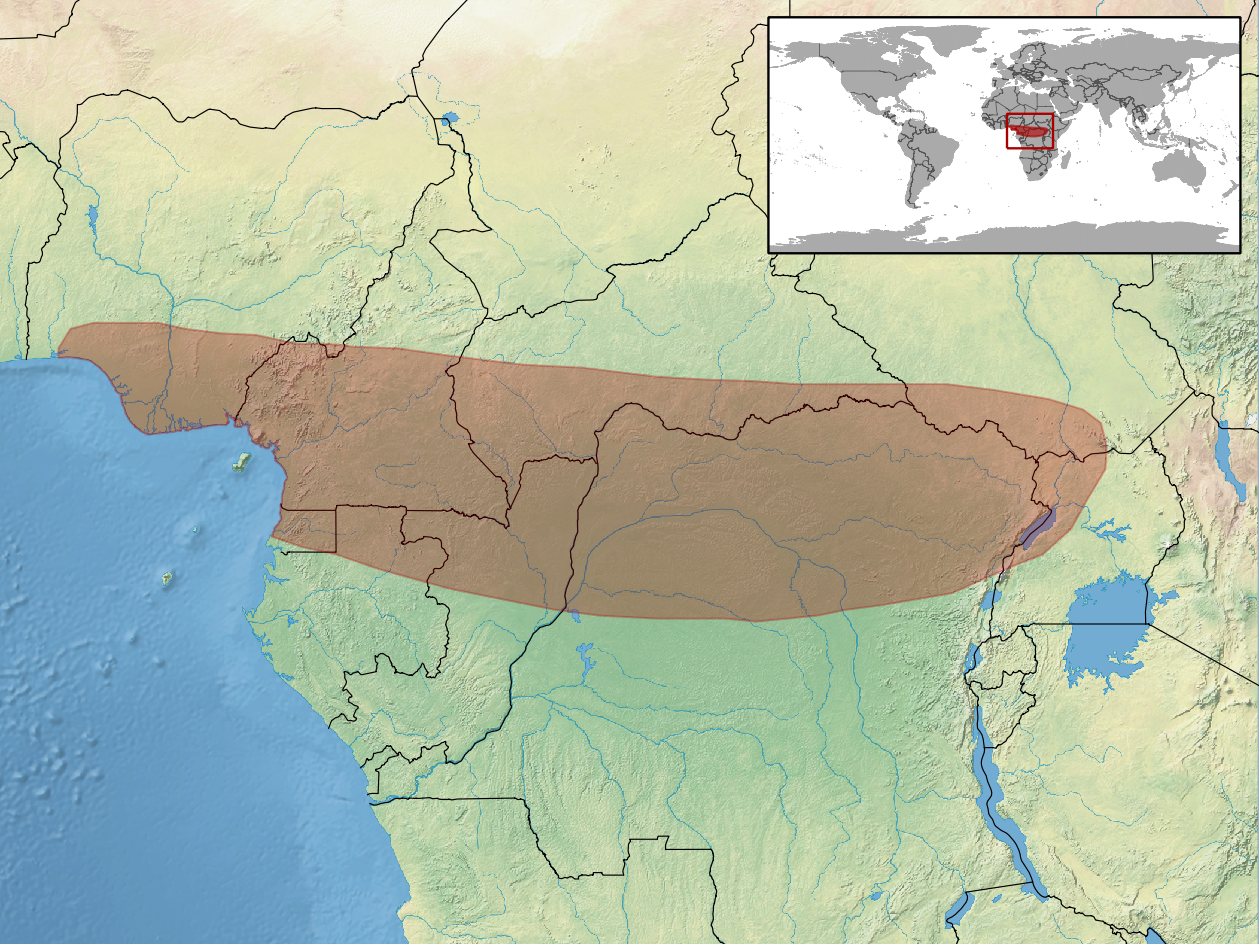

Synonyms
- Lygosoma (Siaphos) aloysii-sabaudiae Peracca, 1907; Lygosoma (Leptosiaphos) weberi Schmidt, 1943; Panaspis aloysii-sabaudiae — Greer, 1974; Leptosiaphos aloysiisabaudiae — Frank & Ramus, 1995

Species of lizard

Leptosiaphos aloysiisabaudiae, the Uganda five-toed skink, is a species of lizard in the family Scincidae. The species is endemic to Sub-Saharan Africa.

== Etymology ==
The specific name, aloysiisabaudiae, is in honor of Italian explorer Prince Luigi Amedeo, Duke of the Abruzzi.

== Geographic range ==
L. aloysiisabaudiae is found in Nigeria, Cameroon, Democratic Republic of the Congo, South Sudan, and Uganda. It might occur in the Central African Republic.

== Habitat ==
The habitats of L. aloysiisabaudiae are riverine woodlands, swampland, moist savannas, and pine plantations.

== Description ==
L. aloysiisabaudiae is a small lizard with a long tail. It may attain a snout-to-vent length (SVL) of 4.5 cm (1.8 in), and a total length (including tail) of 12.5 cm (4.9 in). It is brown dorsally, and it is whitish ventrally. The upper labials are also whitish.

== Reproduction ==
L. aloysiisabaudiae is oviparous.
