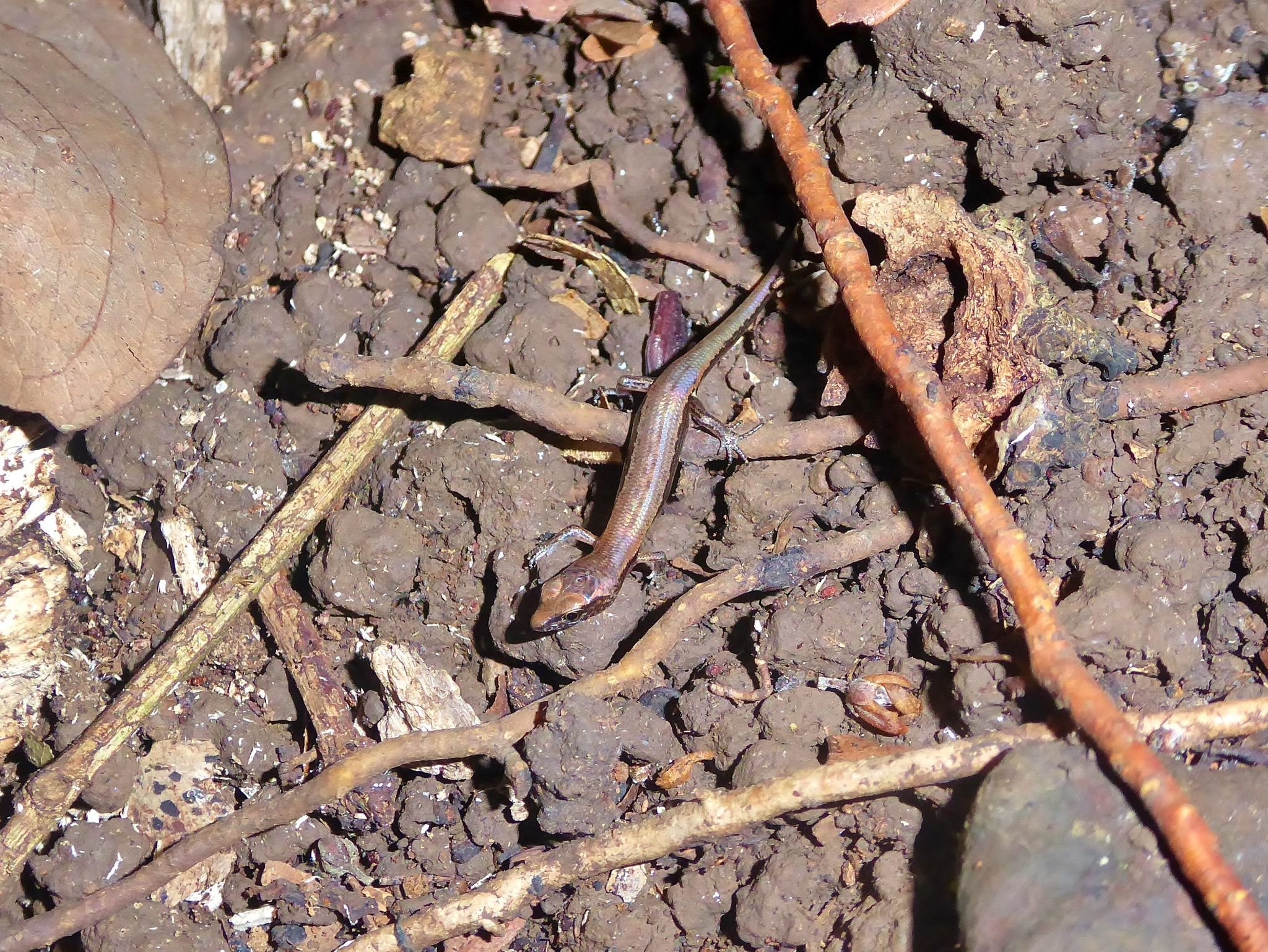

Conservation status
- Vulnerable (IUCN 3.1)

Scientific classification
- Kingdom: Animalia
- Phylum: Chordata
- Class: Reptilia
- Order: Squamata
- Family: Scincidae
- Genus: Panaspis
- Species: P. africana

Binomial name
- Panaspis africana (Gray, 1845)
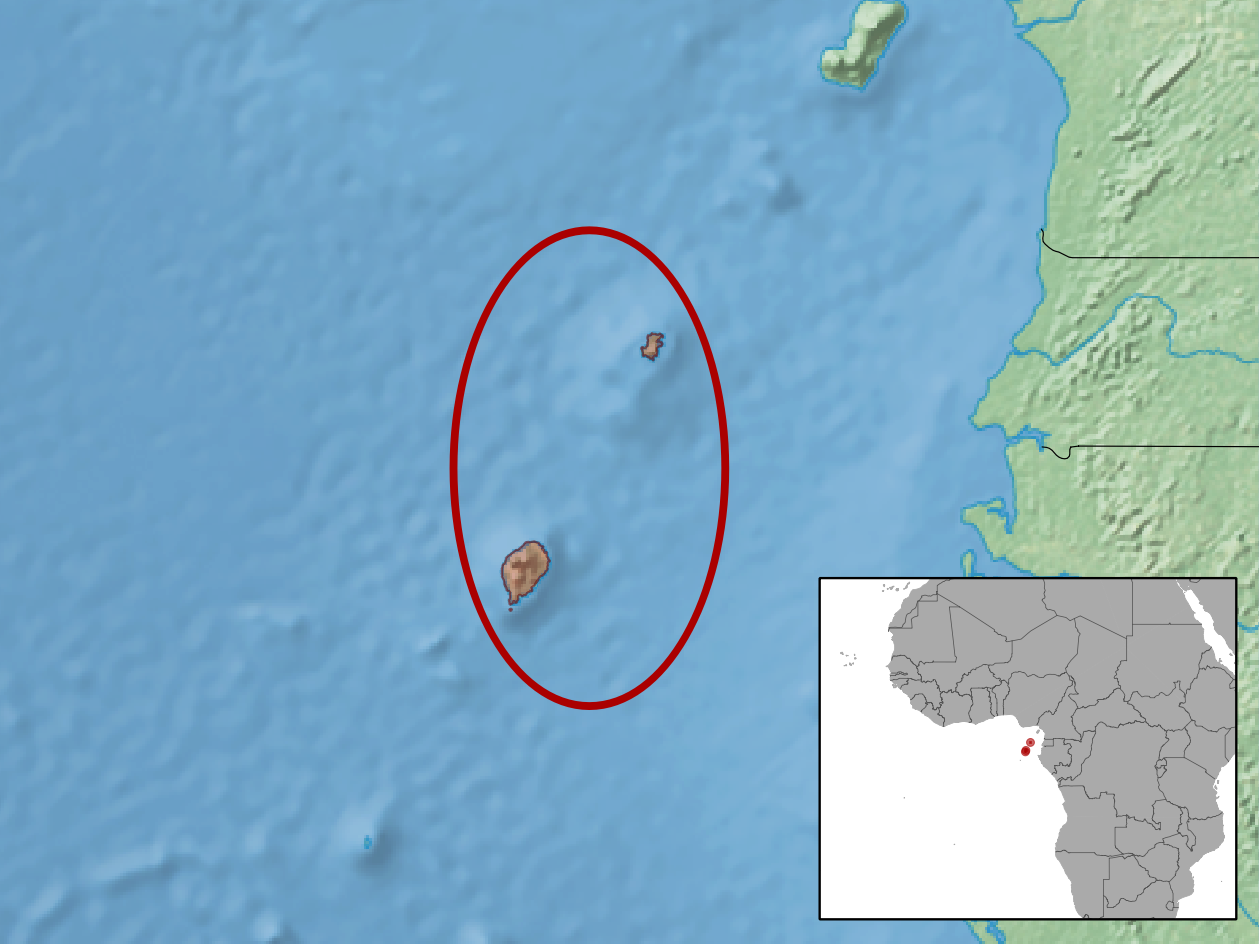

= Guinea lidless skink =

Species of lizard

The Guinea lidless skink (Panaspis africana) is a species of lidless skinks in the family Scincidae. The species is found on Príncipe, Ilhéu das Rolas, and São Tomé.
