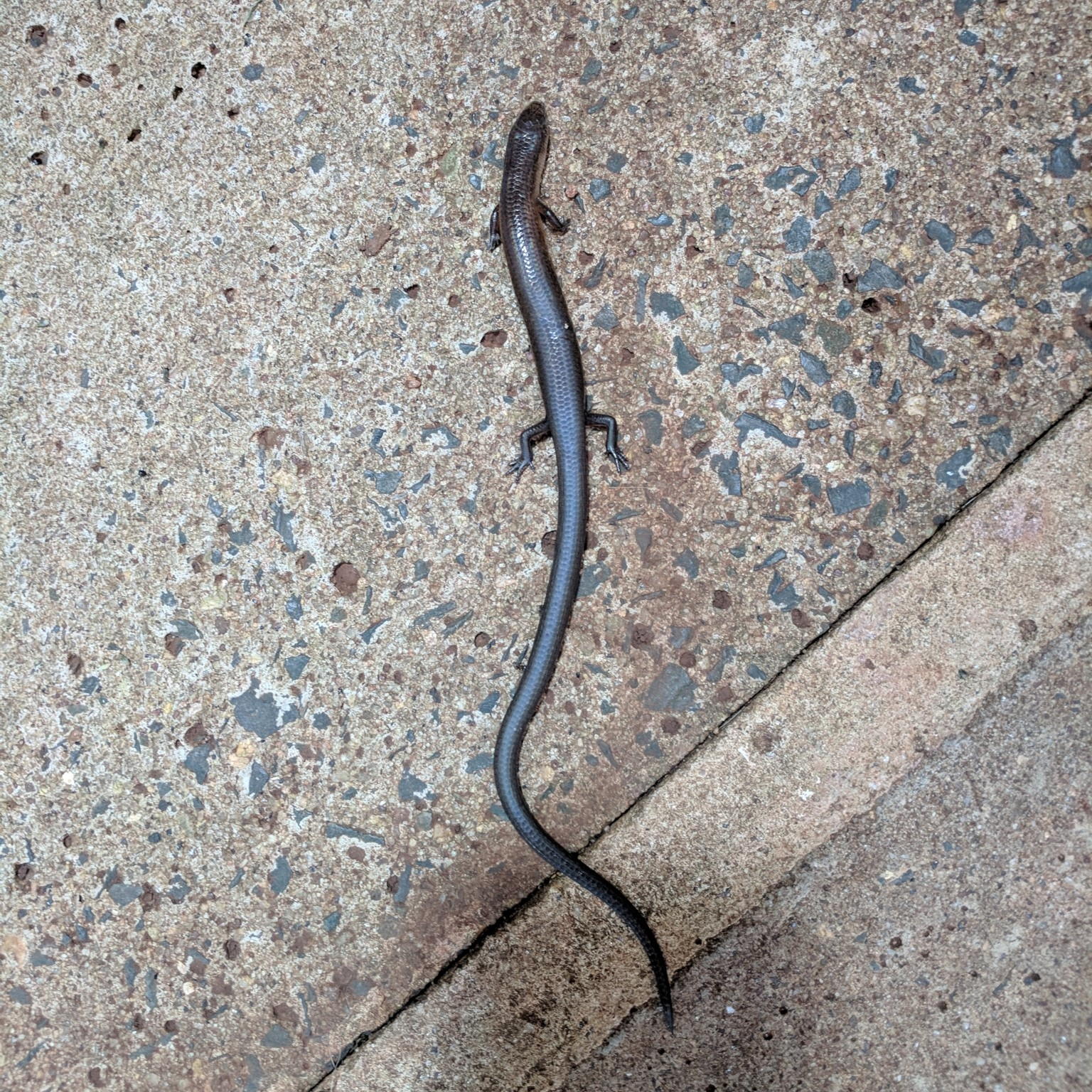

Conservation status
- Least Concern (IUCN 3.1)

Scientific classification
- Kingdom: Animalia
- Phylum: Chordata
- Class: Reptilia
- Order: Squamata
- Suborder: Scinciformata
- Infraorder: Scincomorpha
- Family: Eugongylidae
- Genus: Leptosiaphos
- Species: L. kilimensis

Binomial name
- Leptosiaphos kilimensis (Stejneger, 1891)

= Leptosiaphos kilimensis =

Species of lizard

Leptosiaphos kilimensis, commonly known as the Kilimanjaro five-toed skink, is a species of lizard in the family Scincidae. It is found in Kenya, Tanzania, and South Sudan.
