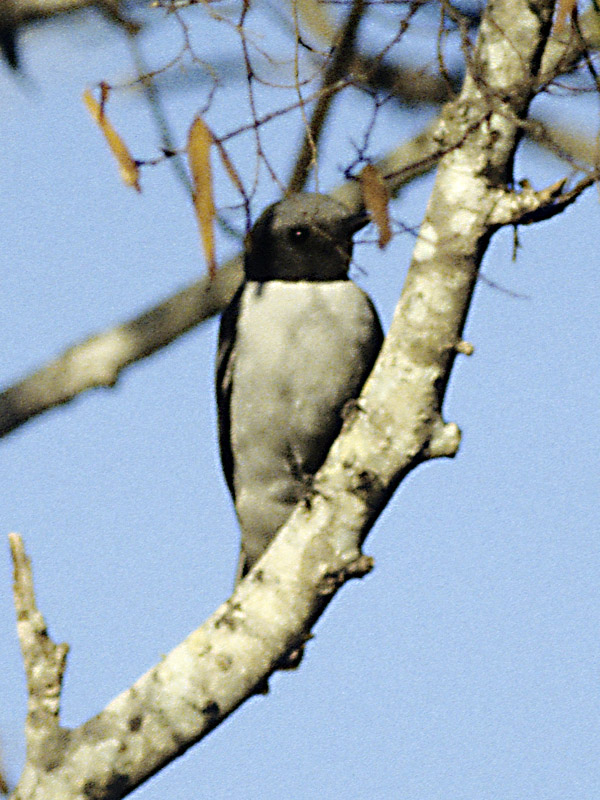
- Madagascar cuckooshrike (Ceblepyris cinereus)

Scientific classification
- Kingdom: Animalia
- Phylum: Chordata
- Class: Aves
- Order: Passeriformes
- Family: Campephagidae
- Genus: Ceblepyris; Cuvier, 1816

Type species
- Muscicapa cana Gmelin, 1788

= Ceblepyris =

Genus of birds

Ceblepyris is a genus of African passerine birds in the cuckooshrike family Campephagidae.

These species were formerly placed in the genus Coracina. A molecular phylogenetic study published in 2010 found that Coracina, as then defined, was non-monophyletic. In the resulting reorganization to create monophyletic genera these species were moved to the resurrected genus Ceblepyris.

The genus contains the following five species:

- Madagascar cuckooshrike (Ceblepyris cinereus)
- Comoro cuckooshrike (Ceblepyris cucullatus)
- Grauer's cuckooshrike (Ceblepyris graueri)
- White-breasted cuckooshrike (Ceblepyris pectoralis)
- Grey cuckooshrike (Ceblepyris caesius)
