= Renaud Paulian =

French naturalist (1913–2003)

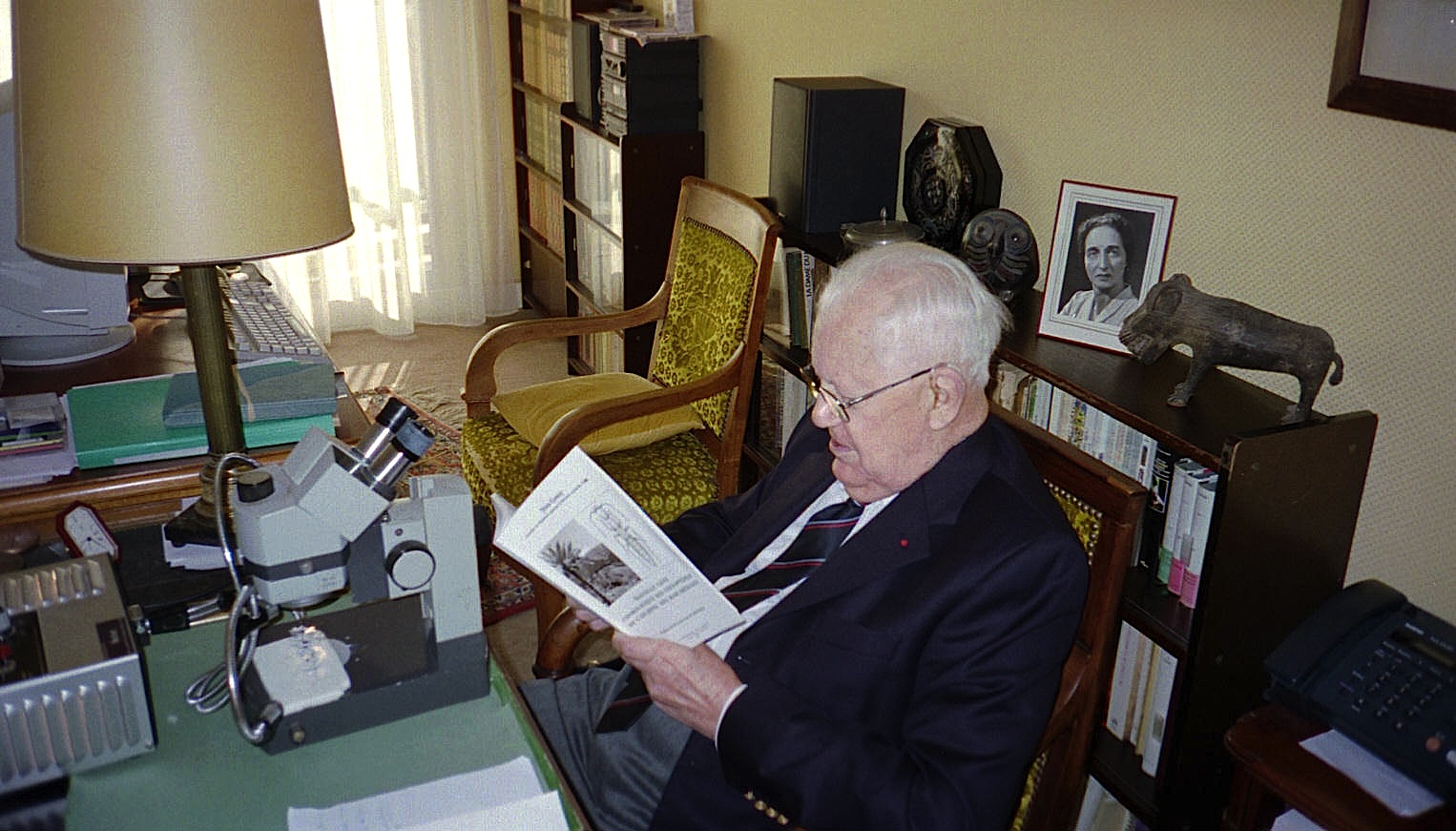
Renaud Paulian in Bordeaux 11 September 2001

Renaud Maurice Adrien Paulian (28 May 1913, Neuilly-sur-Seine – 16 August 2003, Bordeaux) was a French entomologist. He was a specialist in Coleoptera, notably Scarabaeoidea.

== Legacy ==
A species of African lizard, Leptosiaphos pauliani, is named in honor of Renaud Paulian.

== Bibliography ==
- Aberlenc, H.-P. (2003). "Hommage à Renaud Paulian obsèques à Bordeaux, le lundi 25 août 2003, au temple de la rue du Ha". L'Entomologiste. Revue d'Amateurs, Paris 59 (4): 113. (in French).
- Allemand, R. (2003). "Necrologie: Renaud Paulian". Bulletin mensuel de la Société Linnéenne de Lyon 72 (9): 292. (in French).
- Cambefort, Y. (2008). "Renaud Paulian (1913–2003): un naturaliste extraordinaire". Zoosystema, Paris 30 (3): 749–756, B15 10185. (in French).
- Lhoste, J. (1987). Les entomologistes français. 1750–1950. INRA (Institut National de la Recherche Agronomique). 355 pp. (in French).
- Viette, P. (2003). "In memoriam Renaud Paulian (1913–2003)". Bulletin de la Société Entomologique de France, Paris 108 (4): 329–332. (in French).
- Groll, E.K. (2017). Biographies of the Entomologists of the World. Online database, version 8. Senckenberg Deutsches Entomologisches Institut, Müncheberg.
