= Leptosiaphos fuhni =

Conservation status
- Data Deficient (IUCN 3.1)

Scientific classification
- Kingdom: Animalia
- Phylum: Chordata
- Class: Reptilia
- Order: Squamata
- Family: Scincidae
- Genus: Leptosiaphos
- Species: L. fuhni

Binomial name
- Leptosiaphos fuhni (Perret, 1973)

Synonyms
- Panaspis fuhni Perret, 1973

Species of lizard

Leptosiaphos fuhni, Fuhn's five-toed skink, is a species of lizard in the family Scincidae. The species is endemic to Cameroon.

== Etymology ==
The specific name, fuhni, is in honor of Romanian herpetologist Ion Eduard Fuhn.

== Geographic range ==
L. fuhni is only known from the type locality, Abong-Mbang, which is in southeastern Cameroon.

== Habitat ==
The preferred natural habitat of L. fuhni is forest, at altitudes of around 650 m (2,130 ft).

== Reproduction ==
L. fuhni is oviparous.
