= Leptosiaphos hylophilus =

Conservation status
- Least Concern (IUCN 3.1)

Scientific classification
- Kingdom: Animalia
- Phylum: Chordata
- Class: Reptilia
- Order: Squamata
- Family: Scincidae
- Genus: Leptosiaphos
- Species: L. hylophilus

Binomial name
- Leptosiaphos hylophilus Laurent, 1982

Species of lizard

Leptosiaphos hylophilus, Laurenti's five-toed skink, is a species of lizard in the family Scincidae. It is found in Zaire.
