= Leptosiaphos rhodurus =

Conservation status
- Least Concern (IUCN 3.1)

Scientific classification
- Kingdom: Animalia
- Phylum: Chordata
- Class: Reptilia
- Order: Squamata
- Family: Scincidae
- Genus: Leptosiaphos
- Species: L. rhodurus

Binomial name
- Leptosiaphos rhodurus Laurent, 1951
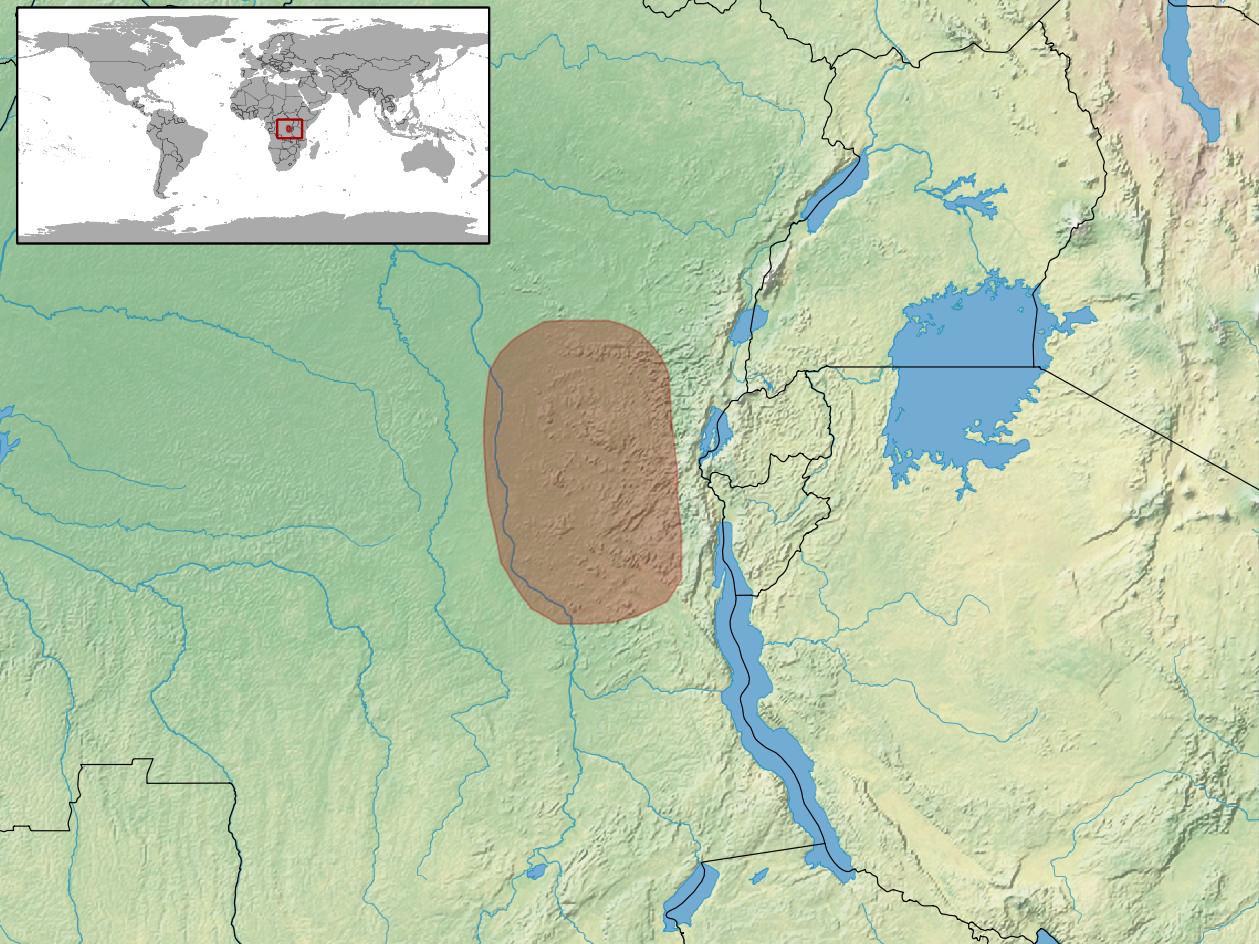

Species of lizard

Leptosiaphos rhodurus, the red five-toed skink, is a species of lizard in the family Scincidae. It is found in the Democratic Republic of the Congo.
