= Leptosiaphos pauliani =

Conservation status
- Endangered (IUCN 3.1)

Scientific classification
- Kingdom: Animalia
- Phylum: Chordata
- Class: Reptilia
- Order: Squamata
- Family: Scincidae
- Genus: Leptosiaphos
- Species: L. pauliani

Binomial name
- Leptosiaphos pauliani (Angel, 1940)
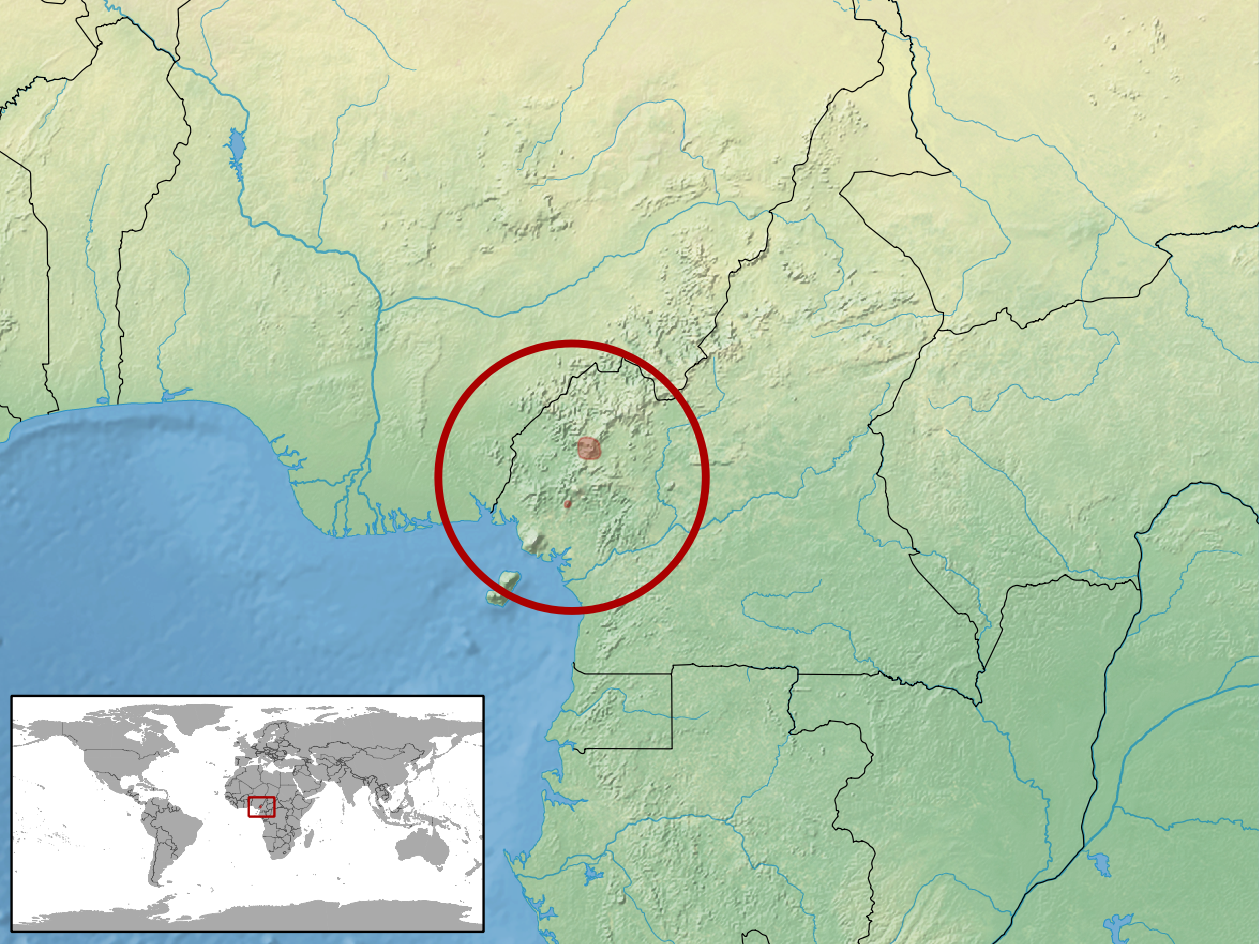

Synonyms
- Lygosoma pauliani Angel, 1940; Panaspis pauliani (Angel. 1940); Riopa erythropleuron Mertens, 1968

Species of lizard

Leptosiaphos pauliani is a species of lizard in the subfamily Eugongylinae of the family Scincidae. The species is endemic to Cameroon.

== Etymology ==
The specific name, pauliani, is in honor of French entomologist Renaud Paulian.

== Habitat ==
The preferred natural habitat of Leptosiaphos pauliani is forest, at elevations of 1,000–2,300 m (3,300–7,500 ft).

== Reproduction ==
Leptosiaphos pauliani is oviparous.
