= Leptosiaphos meleagris =

Conservation status
- Vulnerable (IUCN 3.1)

Scientific classification
- Kingdom: Animalia
- Phylum: Chordata
- Class: Reptilia
- Order: Squamata
- Suborder: Scinciformata
- Infraorder: Scincomorpha
- Family: Eugongylidae
- Genus: Leptosiaphos
- Species: L. meleagris

Binomial name
- Leptosiaphos meleagris (Boulenger, 1907)

Species of lizard

Leptosiaphos meleagris, the Ruwenzori four-toed skink, is a species of lizard in the family Scincidae. It has been found in Uganda, Rwanda, the Democratic Republic of the Congo and Burundi.
