= Panaspis mocamedensis =

Scientific classification
- Kingdom: Animalia
- Phylum: Chordata
- Class: Reptilia
- Order: Squamata
- Family: Scincidae
- Genus: Panaspis
- Species: P. mocamedensis

Binomial name
- Panaspis mocamedensis Ceríaco, Heinicke, Parker, Marques, & Bauer, 2020

Species of lizard

Panaspis mocamedensis, the Moçamedes snake-eyed skink, is a species of lidless skink in the family Scincidae. The species is found in Angola.
