= Panaspis tancredii =

Conservation status
- Data Deficient (IUCN 3.1)

Scientific classification
- Kingdom: Animalia
- Phylum: Chordata
- Class: Reptilia
- Order: Squamata
- Family: Scincidae
- Genus: Panaspis
- Species: P. tancredii

Binomial name
- Panaspis tancredii (Boulenger, 1909)

Synonyms
- Ablepharus tancredii Boulenger, 1909; Afroablepharus tancredi — Greer, 1974; Panaspis tancredi — Broadley, 1998

Ethiopian snake-eyed skink

Panaspis tancredii, the Ethiopian snake-eyed skink or Boulenger's dwarf skink, is a species of lidless skink, a lizard in the family Scincidae. The species is endemic to Ethiopia.

== Etymology ==
The specific name, tancredii, is in honor of Italian explorer Alfonso Maria Tancredi (died 1942).

== Habitat ==
The preferred natural habitat of P. tancredii is grassland, at altitudes of about 3,000 m (9,800 ft).

== Reproduction ==
The mode of reproduction of P. tancredii is unknown.
