= Panaspis maculicollis =

Conservation status
- Least Concern (IUCN 3.1)

Scientific classification
- Kingdom: Animalia
- Phylum: Chordata
- Class: Reptilia
- Order: Squamata
- Family: Scincidae
- Genus: Panaspis
- Species: P. maculicollis

Binomial name
- Panaspis maculicollis Jacobsen & Broadley, 2000

Synonyms
- Cryptoblepharus wahlbergii A. Smith, 1849; Afroablepharus maculicollis (Jacobson & Broadley, 2000)

Species of lizard

Panaspis maculicollis, also known as the speckle-lipped snake-eyed skink or spotted-neck snake-eyed skink, is a species of lidless skink in the family Scincidae. The species is found in southern Africa.

== Distribution ==
Panaspis maculicollis is found in northern South Africa, southern Mozambique, Zambia, Zimbabwe, northern Botswana, northeastern Namibia (Caprivi Strip), and southern Angola.

== Description ==
Panaspis maculicollis is a small skink measuring on average 33 mm (1.3 in) in snout–vent length.

== Habitat ==
Panaspis maculicollis is a terrestrial skink that inhabits open or rocky savanna.
