= Panaspis togoensis =

Conservation status
- Least Concern (IUCN 3.1)

Scientific classification
- Kingdom: Animalia
- Phylum: Chordata
- Class: Reptilia
- Order: Squamata
- Family: Scincidae
- Genus: Panaspis
- Species: P. togoensis

Binomial name
- Panaspis togoensis (F. Werner, 1902)

Synonyms
- Lygosoma togoense F. Werner 1902; Leptosiaphos togoensis (F. Werner, 1902); Panaspis breviceps togoense (F. Werner, 1902); Riopa togoense (F. Werner 1902); Lygosoma kitsoni Boulenger, 1913; Lygosoma houyi Sternfeld, 1916; Lygosoma spurelli Boulenger, 1917; Lygosoma dahomeyense Chabanaud, 1917; Paralygosoma monneti Chabanaud, 1917

Species of lizard

Panaspis togoensis, also known commonly as the Togo lidless skink and simply the Togo skink, is a species of lizard in the subfamily Eugongylinae of the family Scincidae. The species is native to western Africa.

== Description ==
P. togoensis may attain a snout-to-vent length (SVL) of 5.2 cm (2.0 in) and a total length (including tail) of 14 cm (5.5 in). Dorsally, it is brown anteriorly, becoming progressively reddish posteriorly. Ventrally, it is white.

== Geographic range ==
P. togoensis is found in Benin, Burkina Faso, Cameroon, Central African Republic, Ghana, Guinea, Ivory Coast, Mali, Nigeria, Senegal, and Togo.

== Habitat ==
The preferred natural habitat of P. togoensis is forest or savanna near water, at altitudes from sea level to 1,200 m (3,900 ft).

== Reproduction ==
P. togoensis is oviparous.
