= Leptosiaphos amieti =

Conservation status
- Least Concern (IUCN 3.1)

Scientific classification
- Kingdom: Animalia
- Phylum: Chordata
- Class: Reptilia
- Order: Squamata
- Family: Scincidae
- Genus: Leptosiaphos
- Species: L. amieti

Binomial name
- Leptosiaphos amieti (Perret, 1973)

Synonyms
- Panaspis amieti Perret, 1973; Leptosiaphos amieti — Schmitz et al., 2005

Species of lizard

Leptosiaphos amieti, also known commonly as the Cameroon five-toed skink, is a species of lizard in the family Scincidae. The species is endemic to Cameroon.

== Etymology ==
The specific name, amieti, is in honor of Swiss herpetologist Jean-Louis Amiet.

== Habitat ==
The preferred natural habitat of L. amieti is forest, at altitudes of 300–800 m (980–2,620 ft).

== Description ==
L. amieti is reddish brown dorsally, and whitish ventrally. Adults have a snout-to-vent length (SVL) of about 5 cm (2.0 in). The tail length is 1.5 times SVL.

== Reproduction ==
L. amieti is oviparous.
