= Panaspis helleri =

Conservation status
- Least Concern (IUCN 3.1)

Scientific classification
- Kingdom: Animalia
- Phylum: Chordata
- Class: Reptilia
- Order: Squamata
- Family: Scincidae
- Genus: Panaspis
- Species: P. helleri

Binomial name
- Panaspis helleri (Loveridge, 1932)
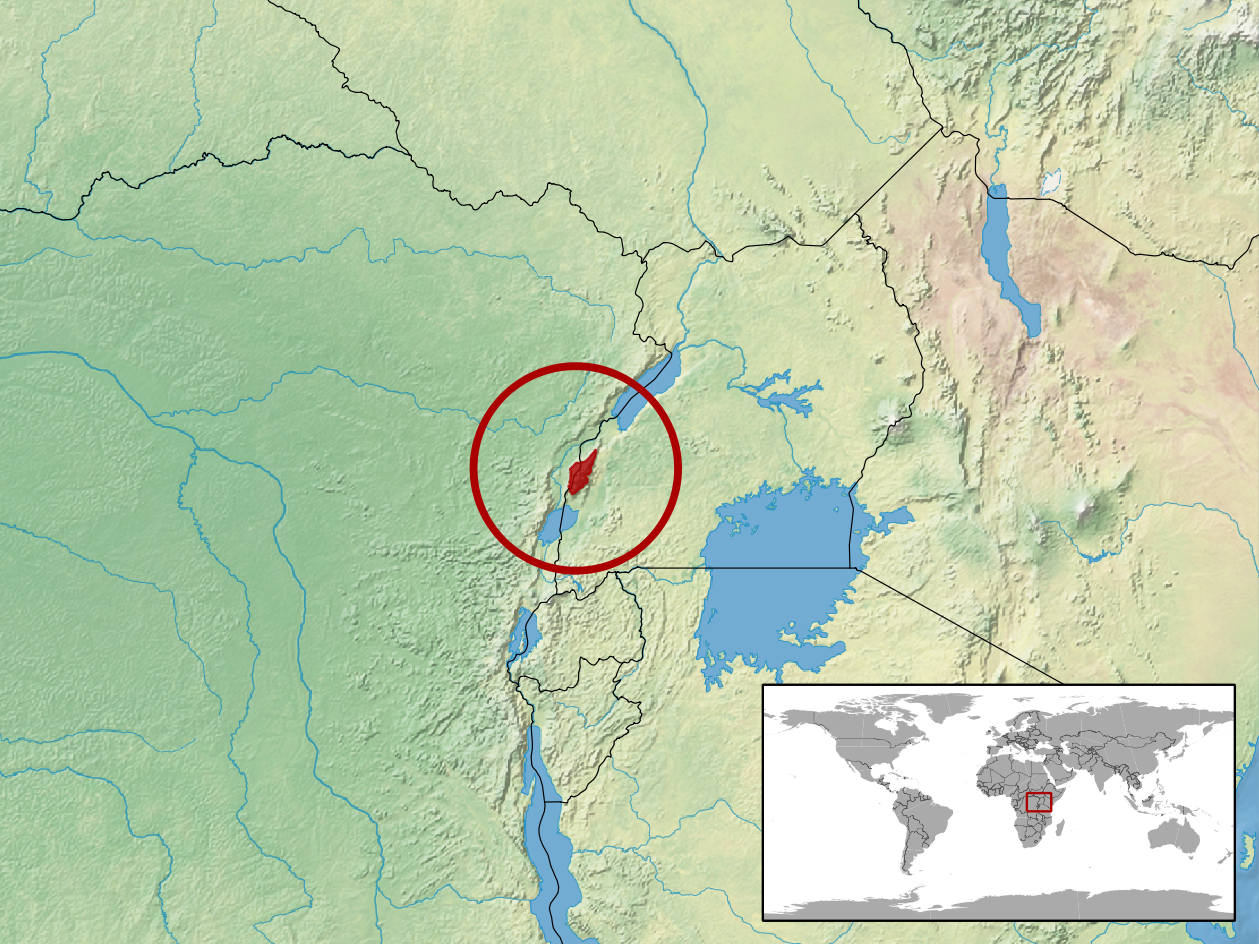

Synonyms
- Siaphos meleagris helleri Loveridge, 1932; Lygosoma (Leptosiaphos) helleri — Schmidt, 1943; Panaspis helleri — Welch, 1982

Species of lizard

Panaspis helleri is a species of lidless skink, a lizard in the family Scincidae. The species is endemic to the Democratic Republic of the Congo.

== Etymology ==
The specific name, helleri, is in honor of American zoologist Edmund Heller.

== Reproduction ==
P. helleri is oviparous.
