= Panaspis tristaoi =

Scientific classification
- Kingdom: Animalia
- Phylum: Chordata
- Class: Reptilia
- Order: Squamata
- Family: Scincidae
- Genus: Panaspis
- Species: P. tristaoi

Binomial name
- Panaspis tristaoi Monard, 1940

Species of lizard

The Nimba snake-eyed skink (Panaspis tristaoi) is a species of lidless skinks in the family Scincidae. The species is found in western Africa.
