= Rudolf Grauer =

Austrian explorer and zoologist

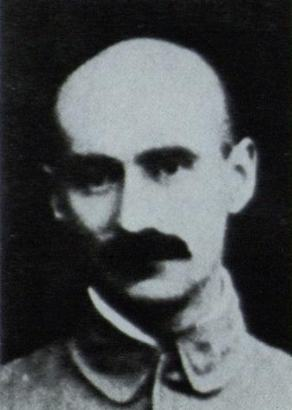

Rudolf Grauer (20 August 1870, Hellbrunn, Salzburg – 17 December 1927, Vienna) was an Austrian explorer and zoologist.

He conducted zoological investigations in British East Africa (present-day Uganda) in 1905, German East Africa in 1907, and in the Belgian Congo (1910–11). In 1910 he was among the first Europeans to come in contact with the Mambuti. He died from actinomycosis, which he had contracted in Africa. His African collections are housed at the Naturhistorisches Museum in Vienna.

== Eponymy ==
Birds:

- Grauer's broadbill, Pseudocalyptomena graueri
- Grauer's cuckooshrike, Coracina graueri
- Grauer's swamp warbler, Bradypterus graueri
- Grauer's warbler, Graueria vittata

Mammals:

- Grauer's large-headed shrew, Paracrocidura graueri
- Eastern lowland gorilla, Gorilla beringei graueri

Reptiles:

- Grauer's blind snake, Letheobia graueri
- Rwanda five-toed skink, Leptosiaphos graueri

Amphibians:

- Grauer's puddle frog (Rugege river frog), Phrynobatrachus graueri

Fishes:

- Bathybates graueri
