= Panaspis duruarum =

Scientific classification
- Kingdom: Animalia
- Phylum: Chordata
- Class: Reptilia
- Order: Squamata
- Family: Scincidae
- Genus: Panaspis
- Species: P. duruarum

Binomial name
- Panaspis duruarum (Monard, 1949)

Synonyms
- Afroablepharus duruarus; Afroablepharus duruarum; Ablepharus duruarum

Species of lizard

Panaspis duruarum is a species of lidless skink in the family Scincidae. The species is found in Cameroon.
