= Leptosiaphos dewittei =

Conservation status
- Data Deficient (IUCN 3.1)

Scientific classification
- Kingdom: Animalia
- Phylum: Chordata
- Class: Reptilia
- Order: Squamata
- Family: Scincidae
- Genus: Leptosiaphos
- Species: L. dewittei

Binomial name
- Leptosiaphos dewittei (Loveridge, 1934)

Synonyms
- Lygosoma (Siaphos) compressicauda de Witte, 1933; Siaphos dewittei Loveridge, 1934 (nomen novum); Lygosoma (Leptosiaphos) compressicauda — Schmidt, 1943; Panaspis compressicauda — Greer, 1974; Leptosiaphos dewittei — Broadley, 1998

Species of lizard

Leptosiaphos dewittei, also known commonly as De Witte's five-toed skink, De Witte's leaf-litter skink, and Witte's five-toed skink, is a species of lizard in the family Scincidae. The species is indigenous to Central Africa.

== Etymology ==
The specific name, dewittei, is in honor of Belgian herpetologist Gaston-François de Witte.

== Geographic range ==
L. dewittei is found in Angola and the Democratic Republic of the Congo.

== Reproduction ==
L. dewittei is oviparous.
