= Leptosiaphos koutoui =

Conservation status
- Data Deficient (IUCN 3.1)

Scientific classification
- Kingdom: Animalia
- Phylum: Chordata
- Class: Reptilia
- Order: Squamata
- Family: Scincidae
- Genus: Leptosiaphos
- Species: L. koutoui

Binomial name
- Leptosiaphos koutoui Ineich, Schmitz, Chirio & LeBreton, 2004
- Leptosiaphos koutoui is only known from the Adamaoua Massif in Cameroon.

Species of reptile

Leptosiaphos koutoui is a species of skink, a lizard in the subfamily Eugongylinae of the family Scincidae. The species is endemic to Cameroon and is only known from the Adamaoua Massif near Meiganga.

== Etymology ==
The specific name, koutoui, is in honor of Denis Koulagna Koutou (born 1958), former Director of Wildlife and Protected Areas in Cameroon.

== Habitat ==
The preferred natural habitat of L. koutoui is forest, at altitudes around 1,050 m (3,440 ft).

== Reproduction ==
L. koutoui is oviparous.
