= Letheobia graueri =

Conservation status
- Least Concern (IUCN 3.1)

Scientific classification
- Kingdom: Animalia
- Phylum: Chordata
- Class: Reptilia
- Order: Squamata
- Suborder: Serpentes
- Family: Typhlopidae
- Genus: Letheobia
- Species: L. graueri

Binomial name
- Letheobia graueri (Sternfeld, 1912)

Synonyms
- Typhlops graueri Sternfeld, 1912; Rhinotyphlops graueri — Roux-Estève, 1974; Letheobia graueri — Hedges et al., 2014

Species of snake

Letheobia graueri, also known commonly as the Lake Tanganyika gracile blind snake, Grauer's gracile blind snake, Sternfeld's beaked snake, and Grauer's blind snake, is a species of snake in the family Typhlopidae. The species is endemic to central and eastern Africa.

== Etymology ==
The specific name, graueri, is in honor of Rudolf Grauer, an Austrian zoologist and explorer.

== Geographic range ==
L. graueri is found in Burundi, eastern Democratic Republic of the Congo, Rwanda, western Tanzania, and western Uganda.

== Habitat ==
The preferred natural habitat of L. graueri is savanna, but it has also been found in agricultural areas.

== Behavior ==
L. graueri is terrestrial and fossorial.

== Reproduction ==
L. graueri is oviparous.
