= Panaspis tsavoensis =

Scientific classification
- Kingdom: Animalia
- Phylum: Chordata
- Class: Reptilia
- Order: Squamata
- Family: Scincidae
- Genus: Panaspis
- Species: P. tsavoensis

Binomial name
- Panaspis tsavoensis Kilunda, Conradie, Wasonga, Jin, Peng, Murphy, Malonza, & Che, 2019

Species of lizard

Panaspis tsavoensis, also known as the Tsavo snake-eyed skink, is a species of lidless skinks in the family Scincidae. The species is found in Tsavo East and Tsavo West National Parks in Kenya; it is probably more widespread in arid lowlands further north in Kenya.

Panaspis tsavoensis is a small skink measuring on average 29 mm (1.1 in) in snout–vent length.
