= Proablepharus reginae =

Conservation status
- Least Concern (IUCN 3.1)

Scientific classification
- Kingdom: Animalia
- Phylum: Chordata
- Class: Reptilia
- Order: Squamata
- Suborder: Scinciformata
- Infraorder: Scincomorpha
- Family: Eugongylidae
- Genus: Proablepharus
- Species: P. reginae

Binomial name
- Proablepharus reginae (Glauert, 1960)
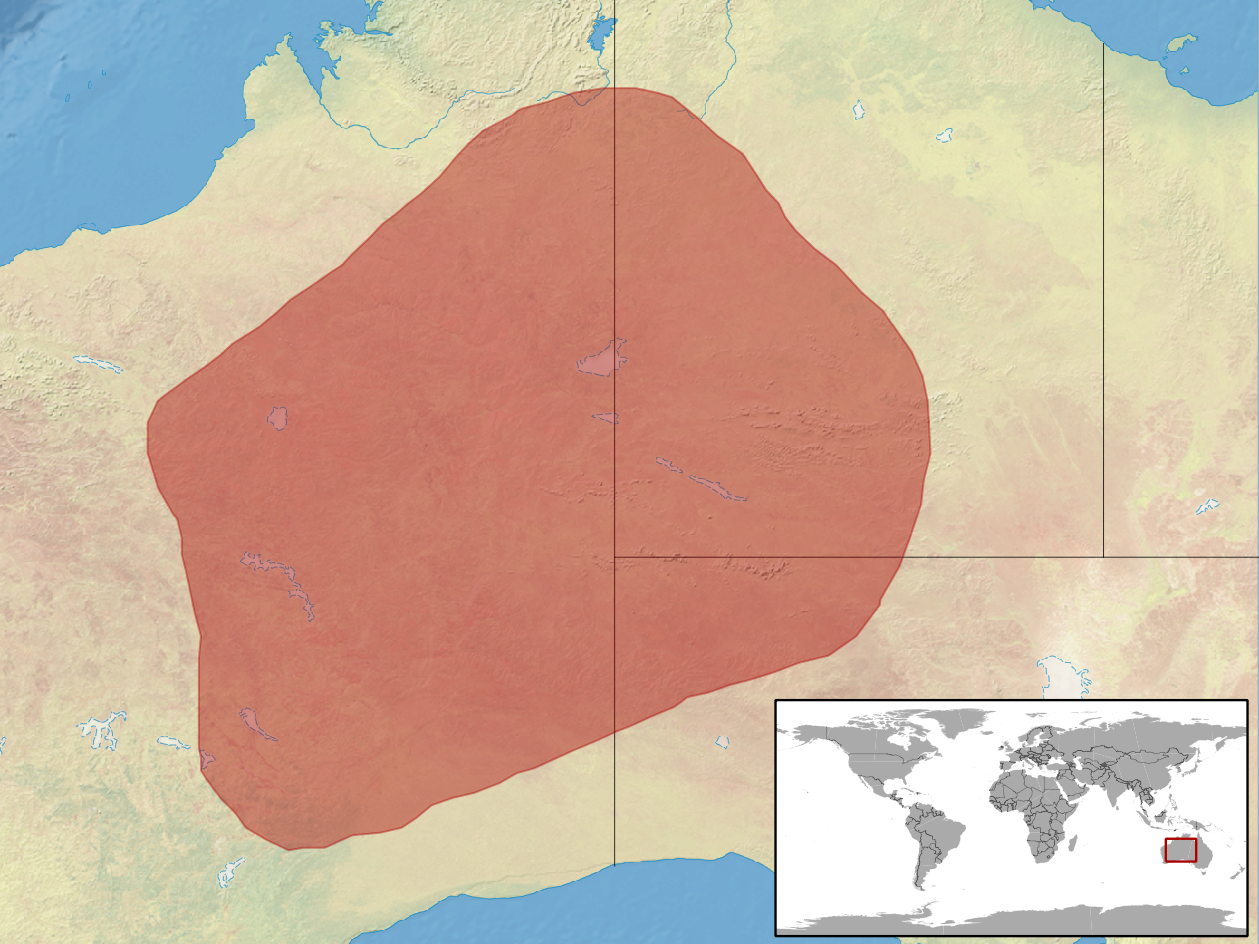

Species of lizard

Proablepharus reginae, the western soil-crevice skink, is a species of skink found in Australia.
