= Johan August Wahlberg =

Swedish naturalist and explorer

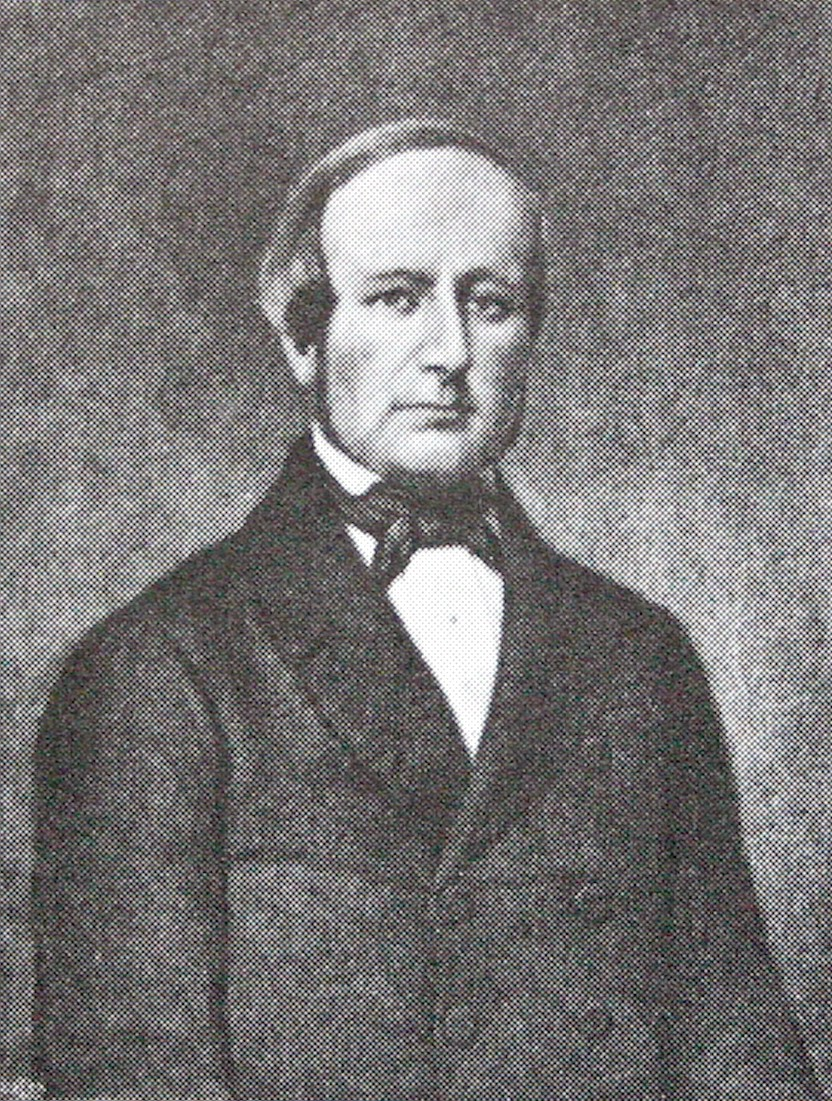
Painting in Royal College of Forestry, Stockholm

Johan August Wahlberg (9 October 1810, in Lackarebäck, Sweden – 6 March 1856, in Lake Ngami, Bechuanaland) was a Swedish naturalist and explorer. Wahlberg started studying chemistry at the University of Uppsala in 1829, and later forestry, agronomy and natural science, graduating from the Swedish Forestry Institute in 1834. In 1832 he joined Professor Carl Henrik Boheman, a famous entomologist, on a collecting trip to Norway. In 1833 and 1834 he travelled in Sweden and Germany on forestry research projects. He joined the Office of Land Survey and was appointed an engineer in 1836, becoming an instructor at the Swedish Land Survey College.

He travelled in southern Africa between 1838 and 1856, sending thousands of natural history specimens back to Sweden. He was exploring the Okavango area along with Frederick Joseph Green (1829-1876) when he was killed, along the Thamalakane river about 10 km northwest of Maun in today's Botswana, by a wounded elephant.

Before his death was known in Sweden, on October 8, 1856 he was elected a member of the Royal Swedish Academy of Sciences, since the news of his death had not reached Stockholm at this time. He is thus the only member of this academy who has been elected after his death.

== Legacy ==
Wahlberg is commemorated in Wahlberg's eagle Aquila wahlbergi (Sundevall 1851), Wahlberg's honeyguide Prodotiscus regulus (Sundevall 1850), Wahlberg's cormorant Phalacrocorax neglectus, Wahlberg's epauletted fruit bat Epomophorus wahlbergi, the bush squeaker Arthroleptis wahlbergii Smith, 1849 (a frog), the spiny flower mantis Pseudocreobotra wahlbergii (Carl Stål, 1871) and a tree Entada wahlbergi.

He is also commemorated in the scientific names of four species of lizards: Homopholis wahlbergii, Pachydactylus wahlbergii, Panaspis wahlbergii, and Trachylepis wahlbergii.

== Works ==
- with Wallengren HDJ (1857). "Kafferlandets Dag-fjärilar, insamlade åren 1838—1845. Lepidoptera Rhopalocera, in Terra Caffrorum. Annis 1838-1845 ". K. svenska VetenskAkad. Handl. 2 (4): 5—55. (in Swedish).
- with Wallengren HDJ (1864). "Heterocera-Fjärilar, samlade i Kafferlandet ". K. svenska VetenskAkad. Handl. 5 (4): 1-83. (in Swedish).

Wahlberg's South African Coleoptera were described by Carl Henrik Boheman and Olof Immanuel von Fåhraeus

- Boheman CH (1851). Insecta Caffrariae annis 1838-1845 a J.A. Wahlberg collecta. Coleoptera. (Volume 1). Stockholm: Fritze & Norstedt 8 + 625 pp. (in Latin).
- Fahraeus OJ in Boheman CH (1851). Insecta Caffrariae annis 1838-1845 a J.A. Wahlberg collecta. Coleoptera. (Volume 1). Stockholm: Fritze & Norstedt pp. 299–625. (in Latin).

Wahlberg's herpetological specimens were made available by Carl Jakob Sundevall to Andrew Smith, and to André Marie Constant Duméril and Gabriel Bibron. These formed the basis for new species descriptions, including in

- Smith A (1849). Illustrations of the Zoology of South Africa. London: Lords Commissioners of her Majesty's Treasury. (Smith, Elder and Co., printers). 48 Plates + unnumbered pages of text.
