= Panaspis megalurus =

Conservation status
- Least Concern (IUCN 3.1)

Scientific classification
- Kingdom: Animalia
- Phylum: Chordata
- Class: Reptilia
- Order: Squamata
- Family: Scincidae
- Genus: Panaspis
- Species: P. megalurus

Binomial name
- Panaspis megalurus (Nieden, 1913)

Synonyms
- Ablepharus megalurus Nieden, 1913; Afroablepharus megalurus (Nieden, 1913)

Species of lizard

Panaspis megalurus, also known commonly as the blue-tailed snake-eyed skink and Nieden's dwarf skink, is a species of lidless skink in the subfamily Eugongylinae of the family Scincidae. The species is endemic to Tanzania.

== Description ==
Panaspis megalurus is a small skink measuring about 41 mm (1.6 in) in snout-to-vent length (SVL). The tail is very long, more than three times the body length.

== Habitat ==
The preferred natural habitat of Panaspis megalurus is savanna, at elevations of 1,000–1,500 m (3,300–4,900 ft).

== Reproduction ==
Panaspis megalurus is oviparous.
