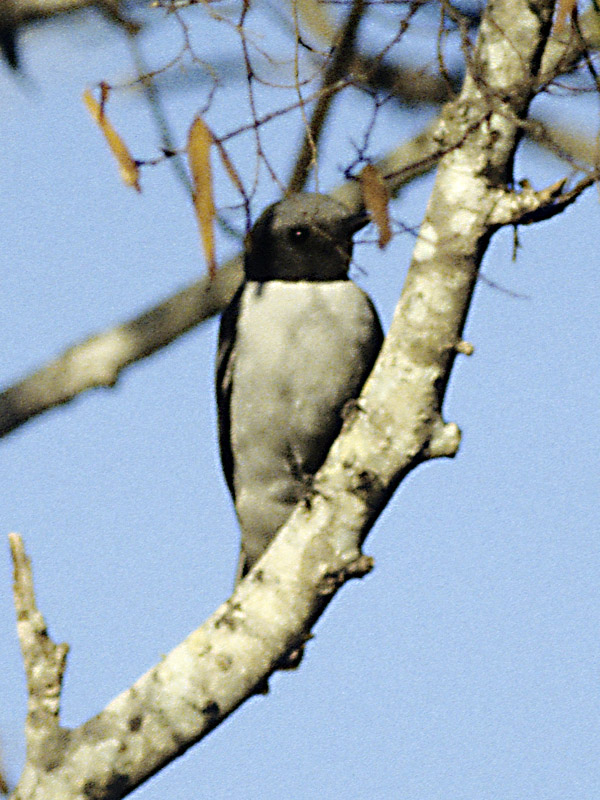

Conservation status
- Least Concern (IUCN 3.1)

Scientific classification
- Kingdom: Animalia
- Phylum: Chordata
- Class: Aves
- Order: Passeriformes
- Family: Campephagidae
- Genus: Ceblepyris
- Species: C. cinereus

Binomial name
- Ceblepyris cinereus (Müller, 1776)

Synonyms
- Coracina cinerea

= Madagascar cuckooshrike =

Species of bird

The Madagascar cuckooshrike (Ceblepyris cinereus), also known as the ashy cuckooshrike, is a species of bird in the family Campephagidae. The Comoros cuckooshrike (Ceblepyris cucullatus) is sometimes considered a distinct species.

It is found in Madagascar, and Mayotte. Its natural habitats are subtropical or tropical dry forest and subtropical or tropical moist lowland forest.
