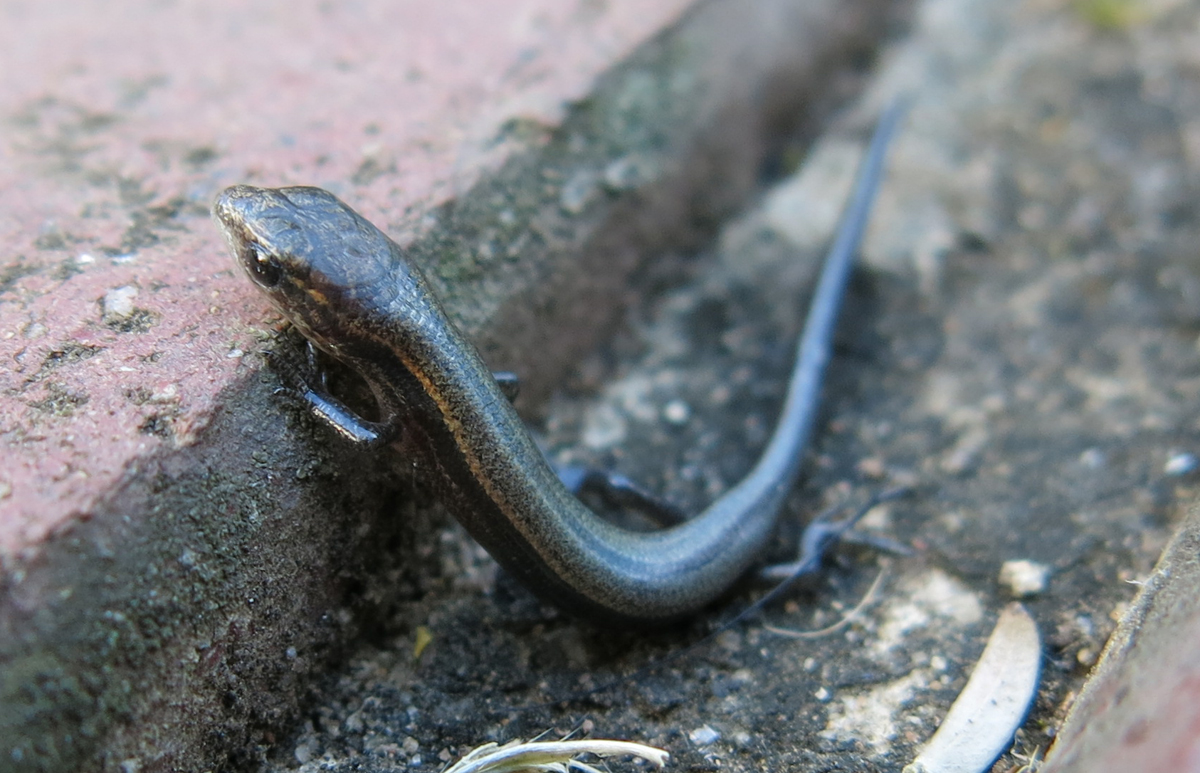

Conservation status
- Least Concern (IUCN 3.1)

Scientific classification
- Kingdom: Animalia
- Phylum: Chordata
- Class: Reptilia
- Order: Squamata
- Family: Scincidae
- Genus: Panaspis
- Species: P. wahlbergii

Binomial name
- Panaspis wahlbergii (A. Smith, 1849)

Synonyms
- Cryptoblepharis wahlbergii A. Smith, 1849; Ablepharus wahlbergii — Strauch, 1868; Ablepharus carsonii Boulenger, 1897; Afroablepharus wahlbergi — Greer, 1974; Panaspis wahlbergii — Lanza, 1988; Panaspis wahlbergi — Broadley, 1998

= Panaspis wahlbergii =

Ethiopian snake-eyed skink

Panaspis wahlbergii, also known commonly as the Angolan snake-eyed skink, the savannah lidless skink, and Wahlberg's snake-eyed skink, is a species of lizard in the family Scincidae. The species is widely distributed in Sub-Saharan Africa. However, it likely represents more than one species.

== Etymology ==
The specific name, wahlbergii, is in honor of Swedish naturalist Johan August Wahlberg.

== Geographic range ==
P. wahlbergii is found in Angola, Botswana, Democratic Republic of the Congo, Eswatini, Mozambique, Namibia, South Africa, Zambia, and Zimbabwe. Earlier records from further north have been assigned to other species.

== Habitat ==
The preferred natural habitat of P. wahlbergii is savanna, both arid and mesic.

== Description ==
Adults of P. wahlbergii usually have a snout-to-vent length (SVL) of 4–5 cm (1.6–2.0 in), and the tail is slightly longer than SVL. Males are larger than females, and the maximum recorded SVL is 6.4 cm (2.5 in).

== Reproduction ==
P. wahlbergii is oviparous. An adult female may lay a clutch of 2–6 eggs. Each egg measures on average 8 mm x 4.5 mm (0.31 in x 0.18 in). Each hatchling has a total length (including tail) of about 3 cm (1.2 in).
