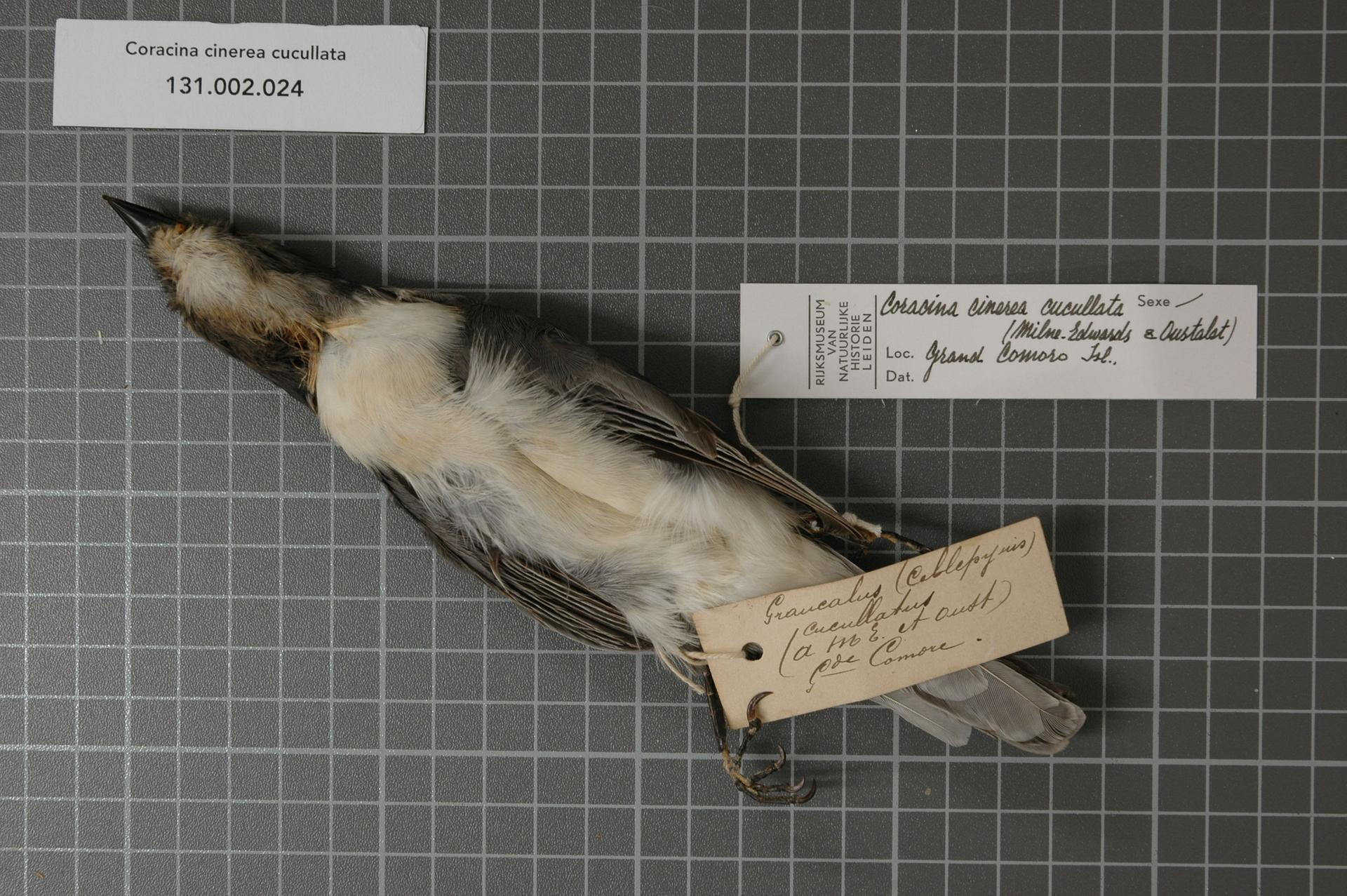

Conservation status
- Endangered (IUCN 3.1)

Scientific classification
- Kingdom: Animalia
- Phylum: Chordata
- Class: Aves
- Order: Passeriformes
- Family: Campephagidae
- Genus: Ceblepyris
- Species: C. cucullatus

Binomial name
- Ceblepyris cucullatus (Milne-Edwards & Oustalet, 1885)

Synonyms
- Coracina cucullata

= Comoro cuckooshrike =

Comoros cuckooshrike

Species of bird

The Comoro cuckooshrike (Ceblepyris cucullatus) is a species of bird in the family Campephagidae. It is sometimes considered a subspecies of the Madagascar cuckooshrike.

It is endemic to the Comoros. Its natural habitats are subtropical or tropical dry forest and subtropical or tropical moist lowland forest.
