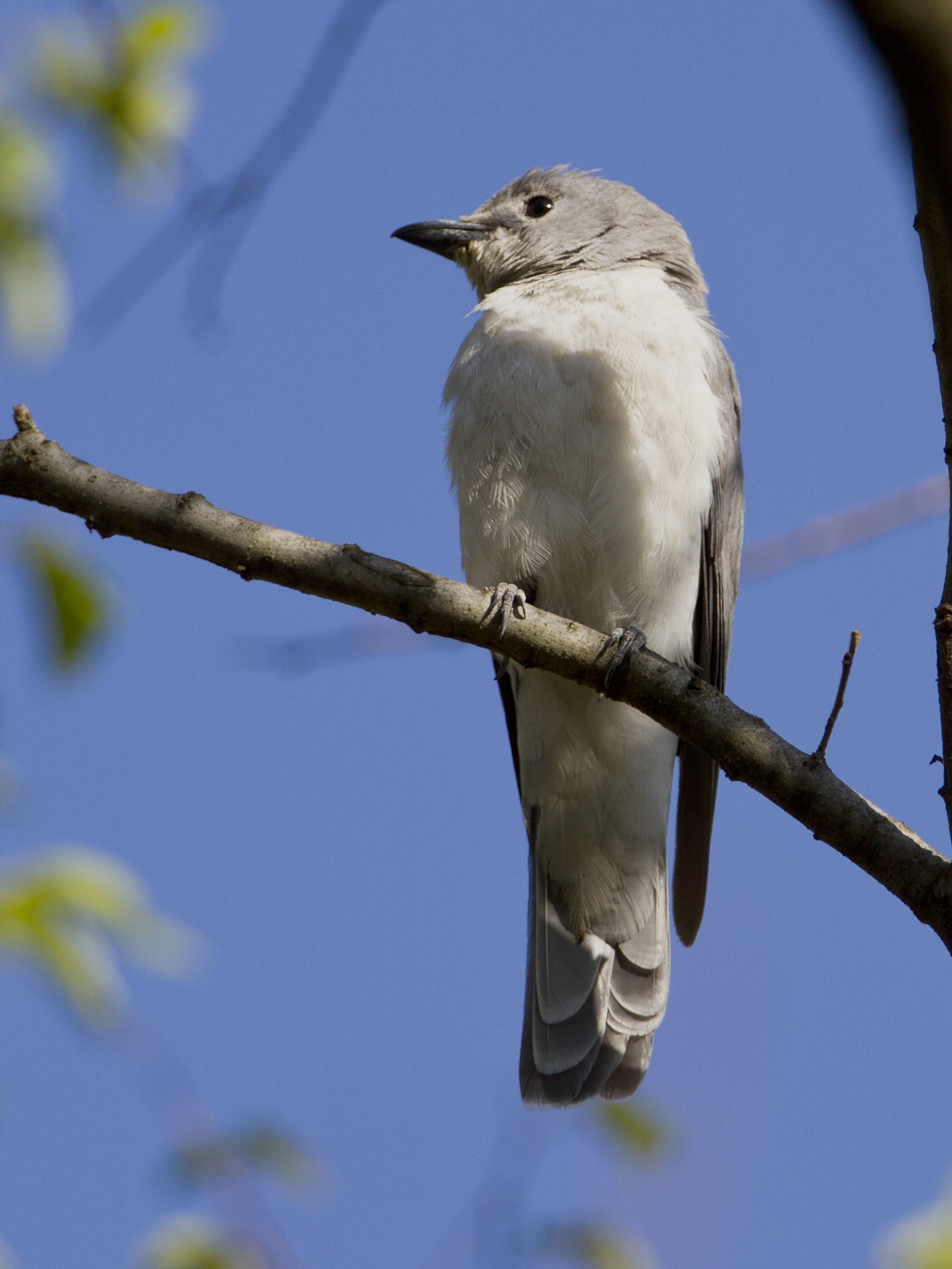
- In Groenkloof Nature Reserve

Conservation status
- Least Concern (IUCN 3.1)

Scientific classification
- Kingdom: Animalia
- Phylum: Chordata
- Class: Aves
- Order: Passeriformes
- Family: Campephagidae
- Genus: Ceblepyris
- Species: C. pectoralis

Binomial name
- Ceblepyris pectoralis (Jardine & Selby, 1828)

Synonyms
- Coracina pectoralis

= White-breasted cuckooshrike =

Species of bird

The white-breasted cuckooshrike (Ceblepyris pectoralis) is a species of bird in the family Campephagidae. It is found in Angola, Benin, Botswana, Burkina Faso, Burundi, Cameroon, Central African Republic, Democratic Republic of the Congo, Ivory Coast, Eswatini, Ethiopia, Gambia, Ghana, Guinea, Guinea-Bissau, Kenya, Malawi, Mali, Mauritania, Mozambique, Namibia, Nigeria, Rwanda, Senegal, Sierra Leone, South Africa, Sudan, Tanzania, Togo, Uganda, Zambia, and Zimbabwe. Its natural habitats are subtropical or tropical dry forest and dry savanna. The species forages at mid-canopy level and is typically found alone or in pairs. It is insectivorous, feeding primarily on insects and caterpillars.
