= Ion Eduard Fuhn =

Romanian herpetologist (1916–1987)

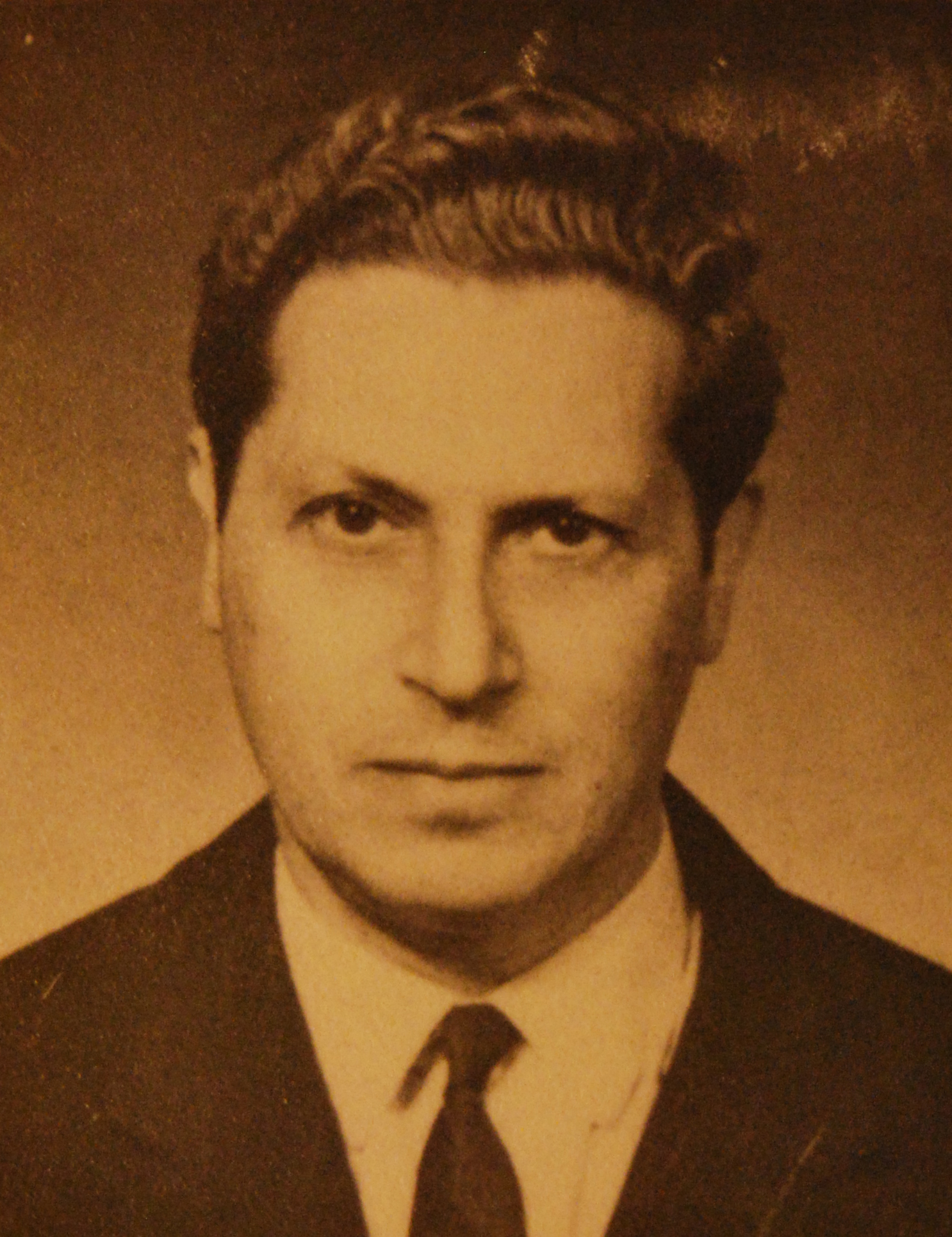
- Born: 5 February 1916; Bucharest, Romania
- Died: 30 August 1987 (aged 71); Bucharest, Romania
- Citizenship: Romanian
- Education: University of Bucharest
- Scientific career
- Fields: herpetology, arahnology

Ion Eduard Fuhn (February 5, 1916 – August 30, 1987) was a Romanian herpetologist. He published over 80 research papers.

== Early life ==
He became passionate about fauna as a youth, writing articles on the subject from age 16.

He graduated from Spiru Haret high school in 1933. He later studied at the Faculty of Philosophy and Law of the University of Bucharest, graduating in 1938. He completed his PhD in 1946 at the same faculty.

== Career ==
He worked as a lawyer from 1944 to 1946. In 1946, just after finishing his studies, he was appointed Attaché of the Department of State, but in autumn 1947, due to the unrest that led to the founding of the socialist state, he lost his diplomatic position, together with his assets and belongings.

As he refused to become a member of the party, he had to exclusively focus on scientific activities. In 1947, the study of amphibians and reptiles became his profession. He produced numerous publications.

He was appointed head of the Natural Sciences department at the Romanian-Soviet Studies Institute in 1947. In 1954, while working as a researcher their, he met his future wife, Eugenia Simian. They married and had one child, Iris Ruxandra Fuhn.

In 1980, Iris married Swiss herpetologist Dr. Georg Heinrich Thommen. He died in 2013, leaving two sons: Raynald Andreas Heinrich Thommen MA (born on January 28, 1982) and Dr. Albert Matthias Ionel Thommen (born on December 6, 1988). Raynald is working as secondary school teacher at Swiss Olympic Partner School Sekundarschule Bäumlihof in Basel (Switzerland) and also managing in presidency the handball club Red Sparrows HSG Freiburg (Germany). Albert carried on the biologist career, completed his PhD at Dresda University and is working today at Francis Crick Institute in London (United Kingdom).

During 1954-1957, Fuhn was an active researcher at the Biology Institute of the Romanian Academy in Bucharest.

On the pretext of not having finished his studies, he was dismissed in 1958, even if that year he had been appointed main researcher in the Collective Fauna R.P.R. of the Academy by a contest committee. He was demoted to technician. He went through several lawsuits with publishing houses and many his articles could no longer be published under his name. In 1969, after 11 years, he was promoted to main researcher.

He assembled a significant collection of specimens gathered from across Romania. His collection was transferred to Grigore Antipa National Museum of Natural History and is still a valuable basis for the study of the variability of amphibians and reptiles. Fuhn was the first Romanian zoologist to grasp that species identification is not enough in herpetology: analysis and classification of subspecies is also of great importance.

He spoke several foreign languages (Romanian, English, French, German), and became part of the translation team of Charles Darwin’s works and worked with screenwriters as a scientific consultant.

Fuhn died on August 30, 1987 after a long struggle with asthma.

== Legacy ==
Fuhn is commemorated in the scientific names of two species of lizards, Cryptoblepharus fuhni and Leptosiaphos fuhni.

== Memberships ==
He affiliated to national and international organizations

- Geography and Natural Sciences Society in R.S.R.
- Commission of the Natural Monuments
- Society for Systematic Zoology of the U.S.A.
- Society of Ichthyologists and Herpetologists.
- First Romanian biologist to be appointed correspondent member of Senckenbergische Naturforschende Gesellschaft in Frankfurt an Main (1966)

== Sources ==
- "Fuhn, Ion E. (1916-1987)". In: Adler, Kraig (1989). Contributions to the History of Herpetology. Society for the Study of Amphibians and Reptiles (SSAR).
- Negrea, Ștefan (2007). "Istoria științelor biologice din România în perioada 1948-1989". Revista NOEMA, Vol. VI.

== Bibliography ==
- Ion E. Fuhn, Fauna Republicii Populare Române. Vol. XIV. Fascicula 1: Amphibia. București : Editura Academiei Republicii Populare Romîne, 1960, 288 p.
- Ion E. Fuhn, Șt. Vancea. Fauna Republicii Populare Române. Vol. XIV. Fascicula 2: Reptilia (Testoase, șopîrlie, șerpi). București : Editura Academiei Republicii Populare Romîne, 1961, 352 p.
- Gheorghe Mohan, Lucian Gavrilă, Aurel Ardelean, Constantin Pârvu. Istoria biologiei în date. Editura All. 1997
- Aurel Ardelean, Gheorghe Mohan, Haralambie Tițu. Dicționarul Biologilor Români. Vol. I. Editura Tipografia Mediagraf, 2000
- Z. Feider, Al. V. Grossu, St. Gyurkó, V. Pop. Zoologia vertebratelor. Editura Didactică și Pedagogică, București, 1967
- Dr.Andy Z.Lehrer - Capitolul Științe biologice în FCER - Acad.Nicolae Cajal, Dr.Harry Kuhler (red.) Contribuția evreilor din România la cultură și civilizație, Editura Hasefer, București, 2004 pp. 226
