= Gaston-François de Witte =

Belgian herpetologist

Gaston-François de Witte (12 June 1897, in Antwerp – 1 June 1980, in Brussels) was a Belgian herpetologist who discovered and described at least 24 different species of reptiles. During his career, he was associated with the Royal Museum for Central Africa in Tervuren (from 1920) and the Museum of Natural Sciences in Brussels (from 1937). He is best known for his research of amphibians and reptiles found in the Belgian Congo, from where he collected thousands of specimens. While in central Africa, he also collected botanical specimens.

== Biography ==
Gaston-François de Witte was the son of Henry de Witte and Jeanne della Faine de Leverghem, and the grandson of Jean de Witte. As a child, he already liked natural science. During his scholarship at the Bénédictins of the Abbaye de Maredsours, Gaston-François met the British zoologist George Albert Boulenger, who came to study fossils from Denée. They became friends and Boulenger encouraged de Witte to study reptiles.

When the First World War broke out, de Witte fled to Boulenger's house in London. There, he learned English. He worked at the British Museum of Natural history where Boulenger taught him technical preparations of zoological collections. On 9 February 1916, de Witte enlisted himself voluntarily. After the war, he studied at the Free University of Bruxelles. There, he would get his PhD.

In 1920, he was temporarily associated with the Royal Museum for Central Africa of Tervuren, to replace, between 1920 and 1921, Henri Schouteden. In 1922, he married Marguerite del Marmol. From November 1924 to September 1925, he went, partially with the company of Schouteden, on a trip to explore the Belgian Congo. He brought back 25,000 specimens, mostly snakes and fish, but also an ethnographic ensemble and many photos, leaving everything to the Museum of the Belgian Congo. Nominated in 1927 as a definitive member, after Jean-Marie Derscheid left, he became in 1936 head of the zoology and entomology sections. From August 1930 to September 1931, he went on a mission to Katanga, finding zoological and botanical specimens, but also cultural artifacts. From August 1933 to 26 July 1935, he explored the Parc national Albert in the Congo, in the region of Kivu.

== Honorifics ==
- Médaille de la Victoire 1914-1918 (28 septembre 1919)
- Médaille commémorative de la guerre 1914-1918 (28 septembre 1919)
- Chevalier de l’Ordre de Léopold II (25 décembre 1926)
- Chevalier de l’Ordre royal du Lion (8 avril 1938)
- Chevalier de l’Ordre de Léopold (8 avril 1946)
- Médaille civique de Première Classe (6 juin 1946)
- Commandeur de l’Ordre de Léopold II (5 mars 1952)
- Commandeur de l’Ordre royal du Lion (18 octobre 1958)
- Grand Officier de l’Ordre de Léopold (8 avril 1965)

He has also been welcomed by foreign societies.

- Honorary Foreign Member of the American Society of Ichthyologists and Herpetologists (1946)
- Member of the International Trust for Zoological Nomenclature (1958)
- Honorary Life Member of the Herpetological African Association (1968)

He has also been awarded the Prix Selys Longchamps (septième période: 1936–1941) from the Classe des Sciences de l’Académie royale de Belgique.

== Eponymy ==
- "Witte's beaked snake", Letheobia wittei, described by Mme. Rolande Roux-Estève in 1974.
- "Witte's five-toed skink", Leptosiaphos dewittei, circumscribed by Arthur Loveridge in 1934.
- "Witte's spider gecko", Agamura misonnei, synonymous with Rhinogekko misonnei (Misonne's spider gecko), described by de Witte in 1973.

== Selected works ==
- Batraciens et reptiles, 1930.
- Revision d'un groupe de Colubridae africains. Genres Calamelaps, Miodon, Aparallactus et formes affines, 1947.
- Amphibiens et reptiles, 1948.
- Genera des serpents du Congo et du Ruanda-Urundi, 1962 – Genera of snakes of the Congo and Ruanda-Urundi.
- Les caméléons de l'Afrique centrale : république démocratique du Congo, République du Rwanda et Royaume du Burundi. 1965 – Chameleons of central Africa; the Democratic Republic of the Congo. the Republic of Rwanda and the Kingdom of Burundi.
