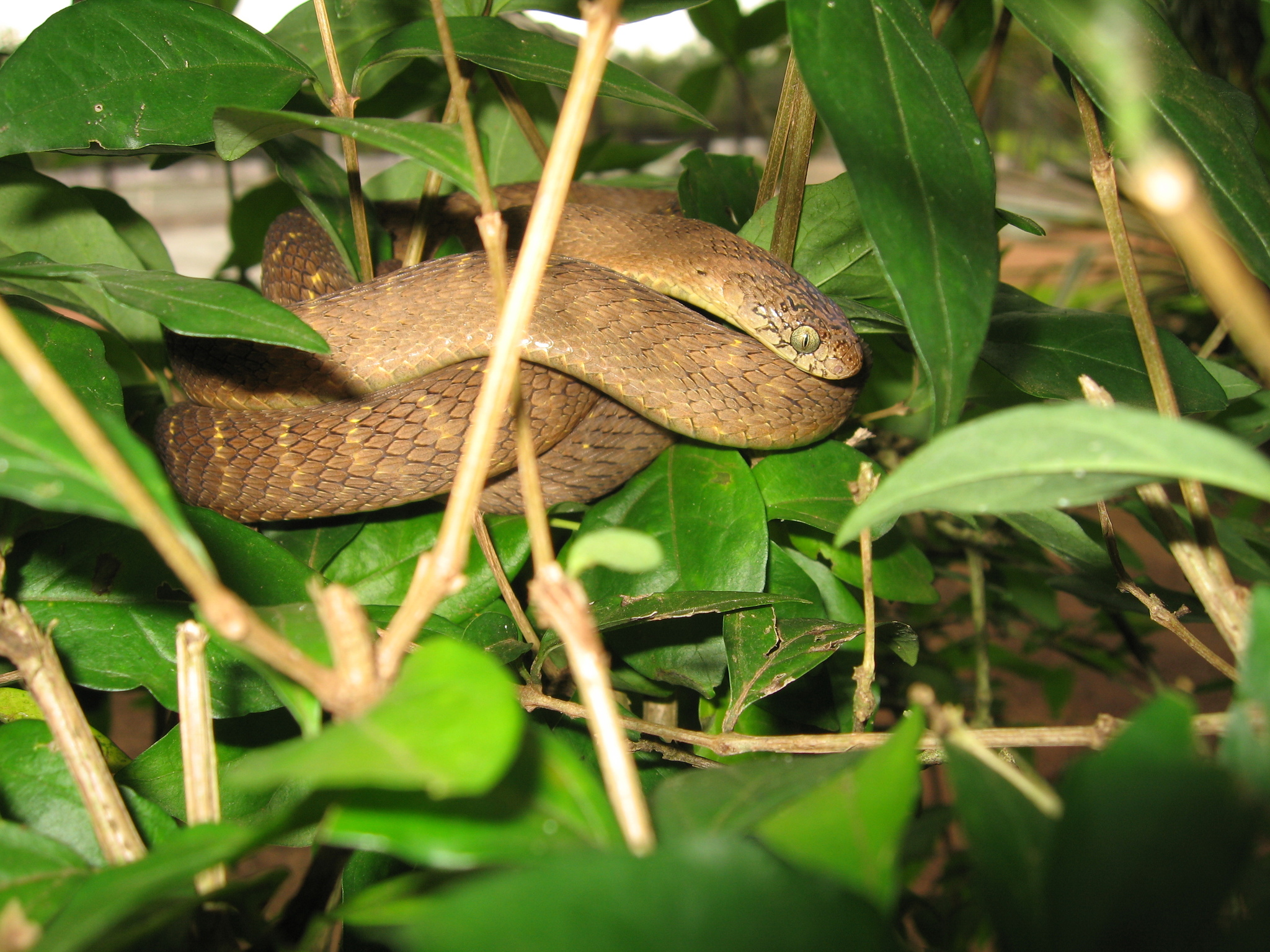
- Near Adum Banso, Ghana

Conservation status
- Least Concern (IUCN 3.1)

Scientific classification
- Kingdom: Animalia
- Phylum: Chordata
- Class: Reptilia
- Order: Squamata
- Suborder: Serpentes
- Family: Colubridae
- Genus: Dasypeltis
- Species: D. fasciata

Binomial name
- Dasypeltis fasciata A. Smith, 1849

Synonyms
- Dasypeltis fasciatus A. Smith, 1849; Dasypeltis fasciata — Loveridge, 1957

= Central African egg-eating snake =

Species of snake

Dasypeltis fasciata, commonly known as the Central African egg-eating snake or the western forest eggeater, is a species of snake in the family Colubridae. The species is endemic to Africa. It is one of 18 species in the genus Dasypeltis, and is occasionally kept in captivity as an exotic pet along with other members of its genus, particularly D. scabra and D. medici.

== Geographic range ==
D. fasciata is found in western and central Africa including the Central African Republic, Gambia, Nigeria, and Uganda.

== Habitat ==
The preferred habitat of D. fasciata is lowland forest at altitudes of approximately 1,000–1,150 m (3,280–3,770 ft).

== Reproduction ==
D. fasciata is oviparous.

== Anatomy and behaviour ==
Owing to their nature as obligate ovivores, all members of the genus Dasypeltis are arboreal, preferring to remain in the trees where they can locate bird-nests, and tend to be nocturnal as this is when the diurnal bird species they prey upon are asleep and most likely to leave their eggs unguarded. Their diet also affects their biology, and has resulted in an evolutionary adaptation that has removed their teeth and substantially increased the capacity of their necks. This facilitates the consumption of whole eggs. Once inside the neck, three bony projections from the cervical vertebrae are extended and the egg is crushed against them, puncturing and cracking it. The eggs are then squeezed to extract the liquids inside, and the shell is regurgitated. This adaptation allows them to exploit a food source that is almost completely uncontested in their natural habitat. During feeding, they have an extensible, highly flattened trachea that can push around the egg and allow them to continue breathing whilst swallowing an egg several times wider than their own body.

== In captivity ==
In captivity, it is recommended that D. fasciata be provided with extensive climbing materials in order to provide environmental enrichment. As is typical in snakes, males tend to be smaller than females. Baby egg-eating snakes and adult males are generally able to eat finch eggs, although some males can grow large enough to eat button quail eggs. Female adults are often large enough to eat full size quail eggs or even chicken eggs. However, in the wild they will only eat eggs that are at a very early stage of development, and cannot digest a foetal bird chick.

== Defence ==
African egg-eating snakes lack teeth, and as such they often have difficulty with defending themselves. This is necessary for their diet, as teeth would reduce the capacity of their necks; however, it presents issues with predation. It is believed that their primary defence stems from Batesian mimicry, as most species in the genus Dasypeltis strongly resemble other, venomous snake species such as black mambas or vipers, providing them with a deterrent against predators. However, this lack of teeth also makes it almost impossible for the snake to harm other specimens in captivity, making it one of the few species of snakes that can be housed communally.

== See also ==
- Garter snakes
- Ovivory
- Indian egg-eating snake
