= Medici (disambiguation) =

Medici, Medicis, The Medicis, or The House of Medici were a prominent medieval Florentine family.

Medici also may refer to:

== Other people ==
- Emílio Médici (1905-1985), former President of Brazil
- Giacomo Medici, several people
- Giuseppe Medici (1907–2000), Italian politician and economist
- Michele Medici (1782–1859), Italian physiologist and medical historian
- Mita Medici (born 1950), Italian actress and singer

== Art, entertainment, and media ==
- Medici (board game), invented by Reiner Knizia
- Prix Médicis, a French literary award
- Medici (TV series), a television drama about the Medici dynasty
- Medici String Quartet, a British classical music ensemble
- Medici, a fictional country and setting of the 2015 video game Just Cause 3

== Businesses ==
- Bank Medici AG, a former bank based in Vienna, Austria
- Medici Bank, a monetary business owned by the eponymous Florentine family

== Science ==
- CERN-MEDICIS, a CERN facility producing medical isotopes

== Ships ==
- Italian destroyer Giacomo Medici, a ship of the Italian Regia Marina (Royal Navy)

== See also ==
- Medici.tv, an online platform
- Medician (disambiguation)
