= Egg predation =

Feeding strategy for many animals

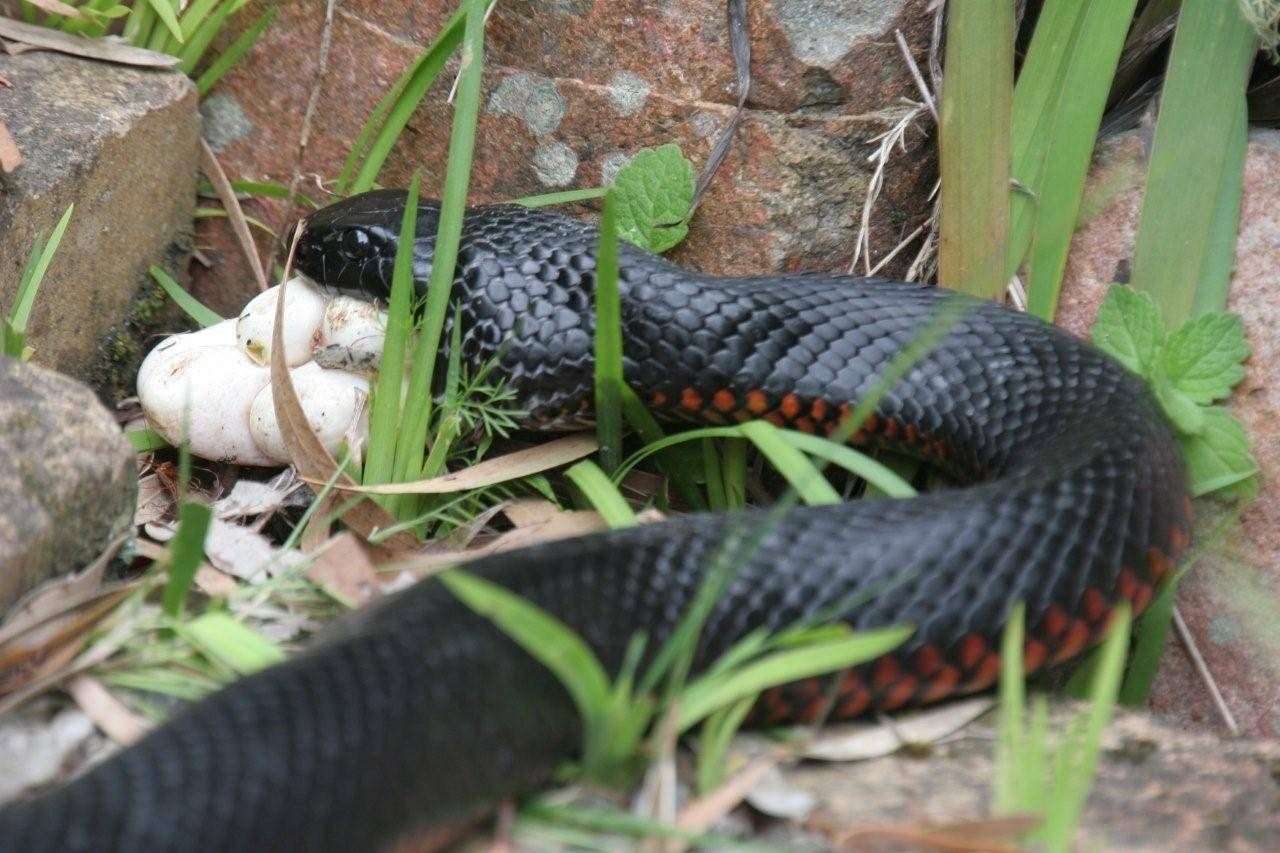
Red-bellied black snake eating green tree snake eggs

Egg predation or ovivory is a carnivorous feeding strategy in many groups of animals (ovivores) in which they consume eggs. A fertilized egg represents a complete organism at one stage of its life cycle, therefore eating a fertilized egg is a form of predation, the killing of another organism for food.

Egg predation is found widely across the animal kingdom, including in fish, birds, snakes, mammals, and arthropods. Some species are specialist egg predators, but many more are generalists which take eggs when the opportunity arises.

Humans have accidentally or intentionally introduced egg predators such as rats to places that had been free of them, causing damage to native species such as ground-nesting seabirds. Predatory birds such as ravens and gulls have spread, threatening ground-nesting birds such as sage grouse and terns. Measures to control such predators include the use of poisoned bait eggs.

== Definitions ==
An ovivore or ovivorous animal is one that eats eggs, from Latin ovum, egg, and vorare, to devour. An obligate ovivore or egg predator is an animal that feeds exclusively on eggs. This is different from an egg parasite, an animal such as a parasitic wasp which grows inside the egg of another insect.

== Ecological relationship ==
Egg predation is an ecological relationship in which an animal (a predator) hunts for and eats the eggs of another (prey) species. This reduces the evolutionary fitness of the parents whose eggs are preyed on.

=== Generalist egg predators ===
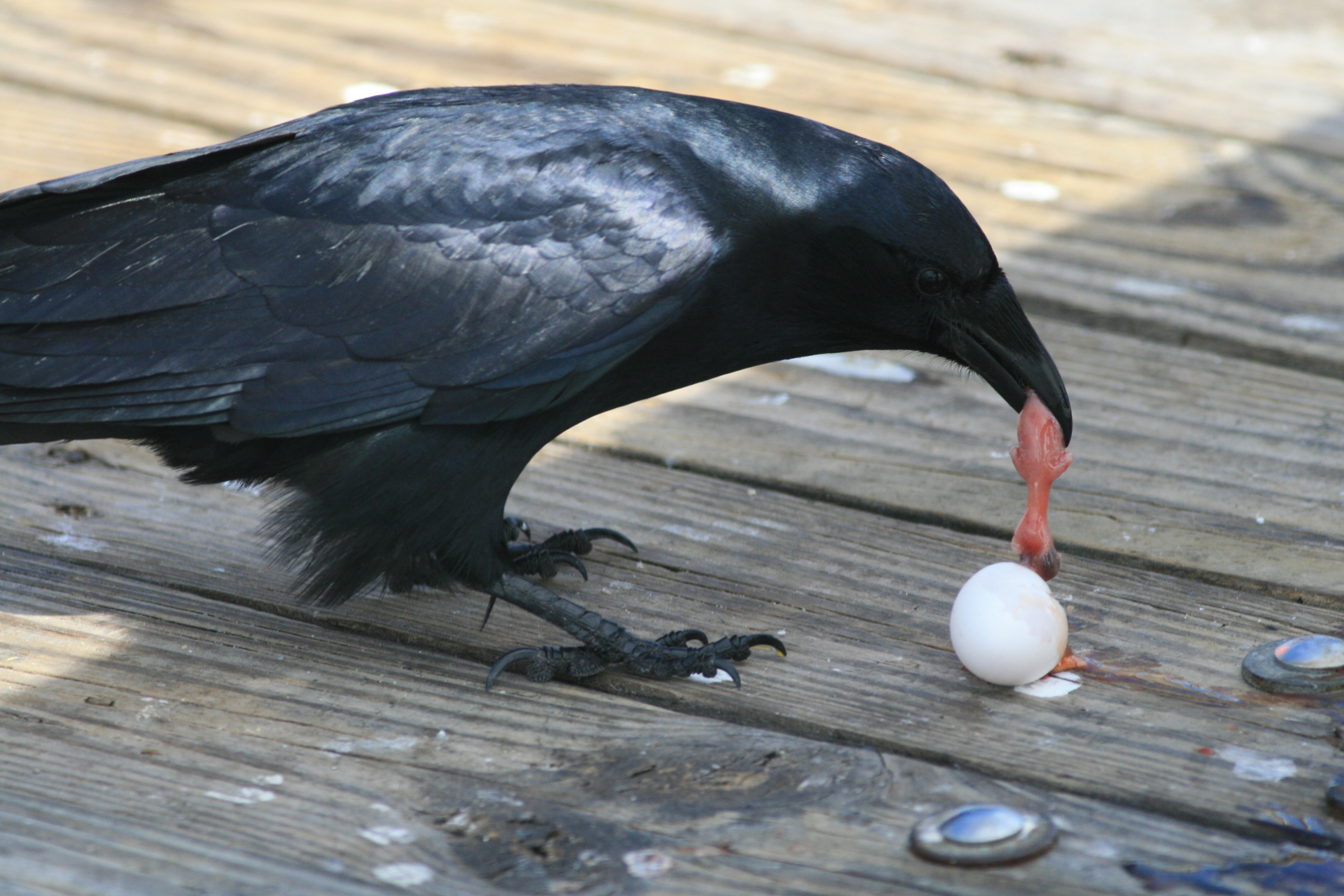
Generalist and omnivorous predators like this fish crow, Corvus ossifragus, eat eggs among many other prey when they have the opportunity.

Generalist predators can have a substantial effect on ground-nesting birds such as the European golden plover, Pluvialis apricaria: in Norway 78.2% of nests of this species were preyed on. Experimental removal of two nest and egg predators, red fox and carrion crow, raised the percentage of pairs that fledged young from c. 18% to c. 75%. Population increases among many generalist predators such as buzzard, badger, carrion crow, pine marten, raven, and red fox in Scotland have contributed to the decline in several ground-nesting bird species by taking eggs, young, and sitting hen (female) birds.

=== Learnt behaviours for egg predation ===
Corvids such as ravens are intelligent and able to develop novel foraging behaviours. Within the 21st century, little ravens have learnt to depredate little penguin burrows to access the eggs on Phillip Island off southeastern Australia. About a quarter of the attacks were down the entrance hole (for short burrows only); the remainder were by digging a hole through the roof of the burrow. Ravens depredated 61% of monitored burrows.

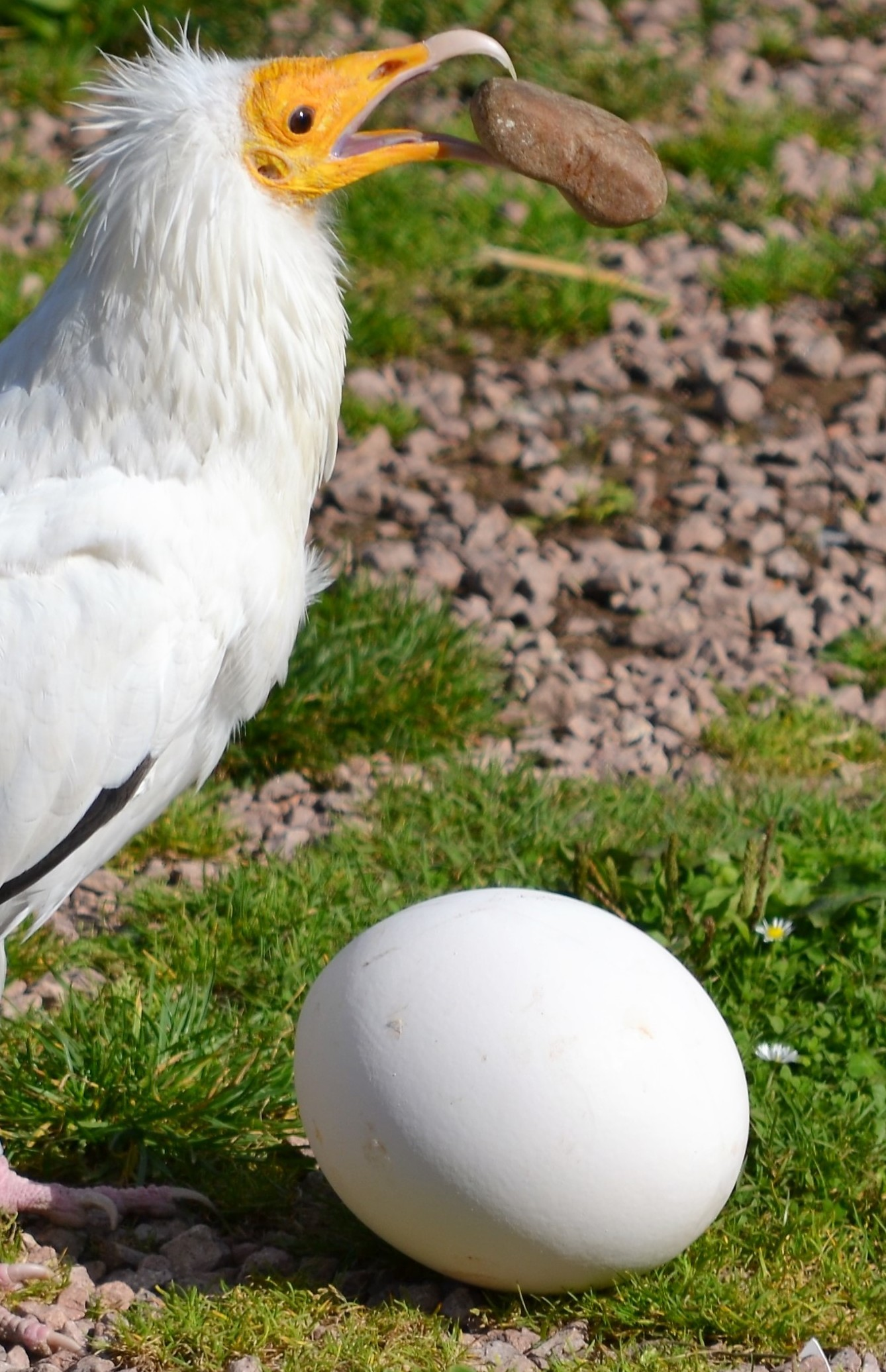
Egyptian vulture using a stone to break an egg too large to pick up

The primatologist Jane Goodall noted that some birds and mammals used tools to break eggs. Egyptian vultures both drop small eggs to break them, and throw stones at ostrich eggs which are too large to pick up. Several species of mongooses throw eggs at rocks, or pick eggs up and drop them on rocks.

=== Specialist egg predators ===
Some snakes specialise in egg predation, such as the Formosa kukri snake Oligodon formosanus, the marbled sea snake Aipysurus eydouxii, African egg-eating snakes (Dasypeltis spp.) and the Indian egg-eating snake Elachistodon westermanni. These snakes have various adaptations to their diet, such as atrophied teeth and venom glands, which are no longer needed for prey capture (though the few teeth of African egg-eating snakes are still used to help grip eggs when swallowing them). The marbled sea snake also has a deletion mutation in its three-finger toxin gene, reducing its venom toxicity by between 50- and 100-fold. In the African and Indian egg-eating snakes, there are hypapophyses (protrusions) on the vertebrae which are used to break swallowed eggs.

Among invertebrates, the aquatic piscicolid leech Cystobranchus virginicus is an egg predator. It may be an obligate egg-feeder, as it has not been seen feeding on an adult, but has been found in the nests of a variety of species of North American freshwater fish of the genera Campostoma and Moxostoma. A species of thrips, Mirothrips arbiter, from Brazil is an obligate egg predator; it breeds in colonies of paper wasps (Polistinae); both its larvae and its adults feed on the eggs of the wasp.

=== Strategies against egg predation ===
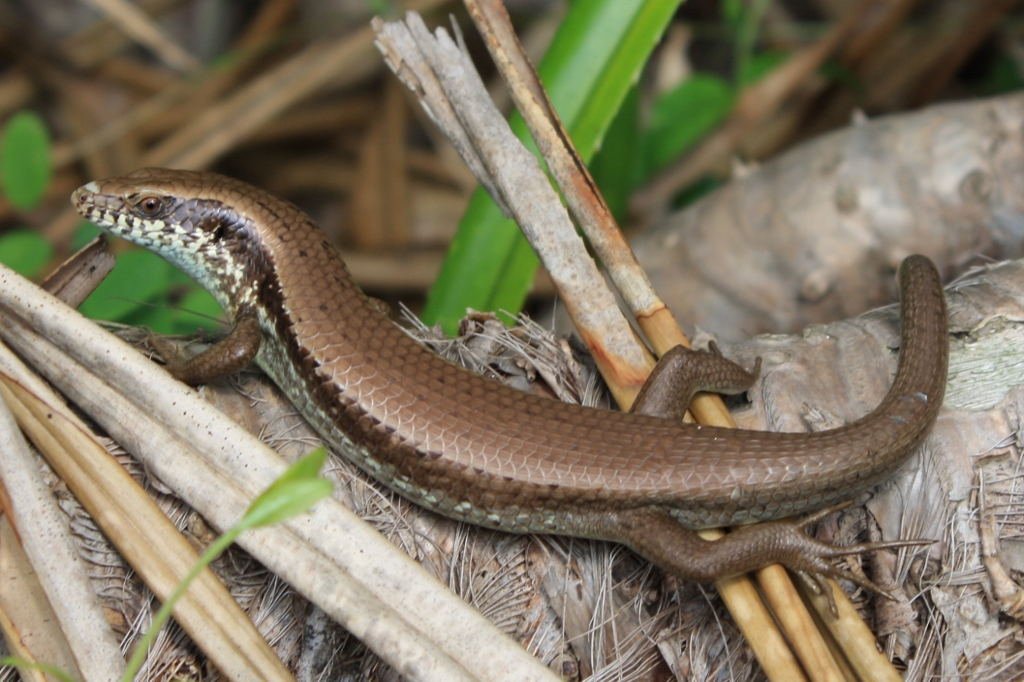
The long-tailed skink, Eutropis longicaudata, actively defends its nest against snakes.

r/K selection theory implies two broad strategies for surviving predation: to reproduce so rapidly (r-strategists) that predators are unable to eliminate the prey; or to provide sufficient care (K-strategists) for a smaller number of offspring that enough of them survive to adulthood. In the case of eggs, this means that r-strategists lay large numbers of eggs, while K-strategists take care to protect a smaller number of eggs. Lacebugs of the genus Corythucha are subject to egg predation by obligate egg predators like mirid bugs, pirate bugs, and thrips, and respond to it in varying ways. C. solani mothers defend their eggs from predators, while C. marmorata buries its eggs inside leaves and distributes them in space and time.

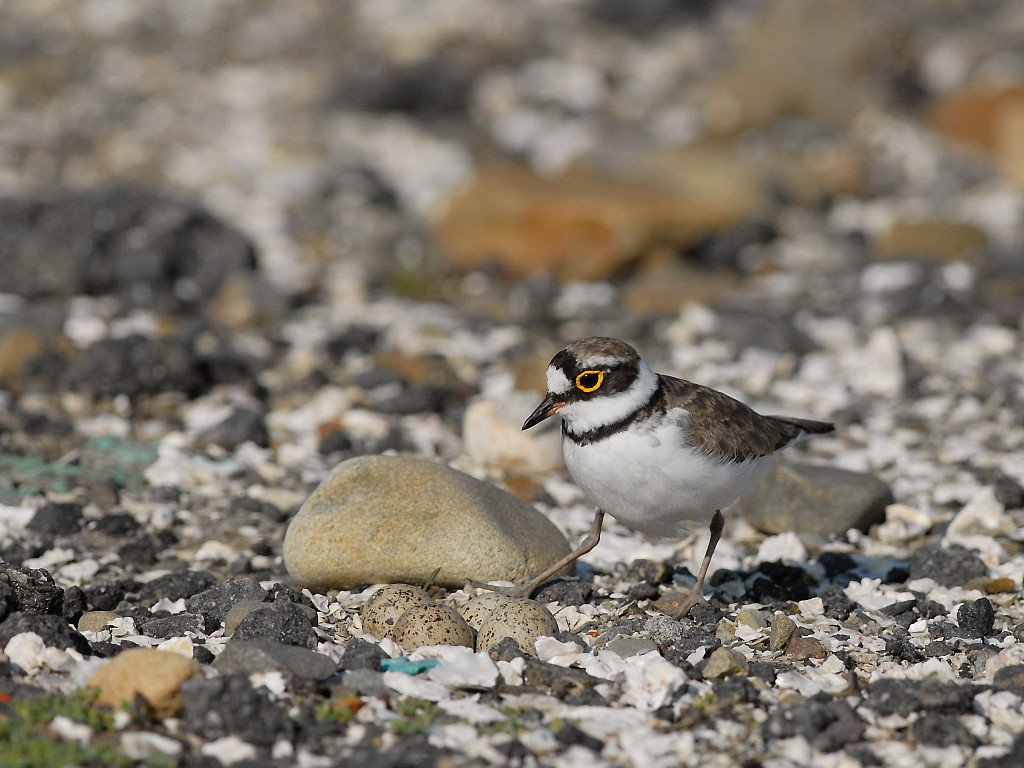
Little ringed plover at its nest; the eggs are camouflaged like the pebbles among which they are laid.

Bird nests are vulnerable to egg predation, especially for those such as eider ducks which nest on the ground. In response to the robbing of eggs from eider duck nests, half the individuals started a fresh clutch of eggs in a new nest; they always avoided the area around the robbed nest. Tree-nesting birds, too, are depredated by snakes, mammals, and birds, particularly in tropical forests. In Costa Rica, the rate of nest predation on artificial nests was greatest at intermediate altitudes (between 500 and 650 metres), with a decline in predation at higher altitudes to 2,740 metres. This may explain why many bird species migrate uphill to breed. Egg predation by snakes is rarely directly opposed, but the Asian long-tailed skink Eutropis longicaudata aggressively protects its eggs from the Formosa kukri snake, Oligodon formosanus.

Bird eggs are coloured and patterned, seemingly primarily for camouflage to deceive the eyes of egg predators; for example, Eurasian curlews nest among tall grasses and have eggs that are green and spotted like their background, as well as being defended by the adults; in contrast, the eggs of little ringed plovers, laid on pebbly beaches, are pale and speckled, hard to see among small stones.

== Fossil record ==
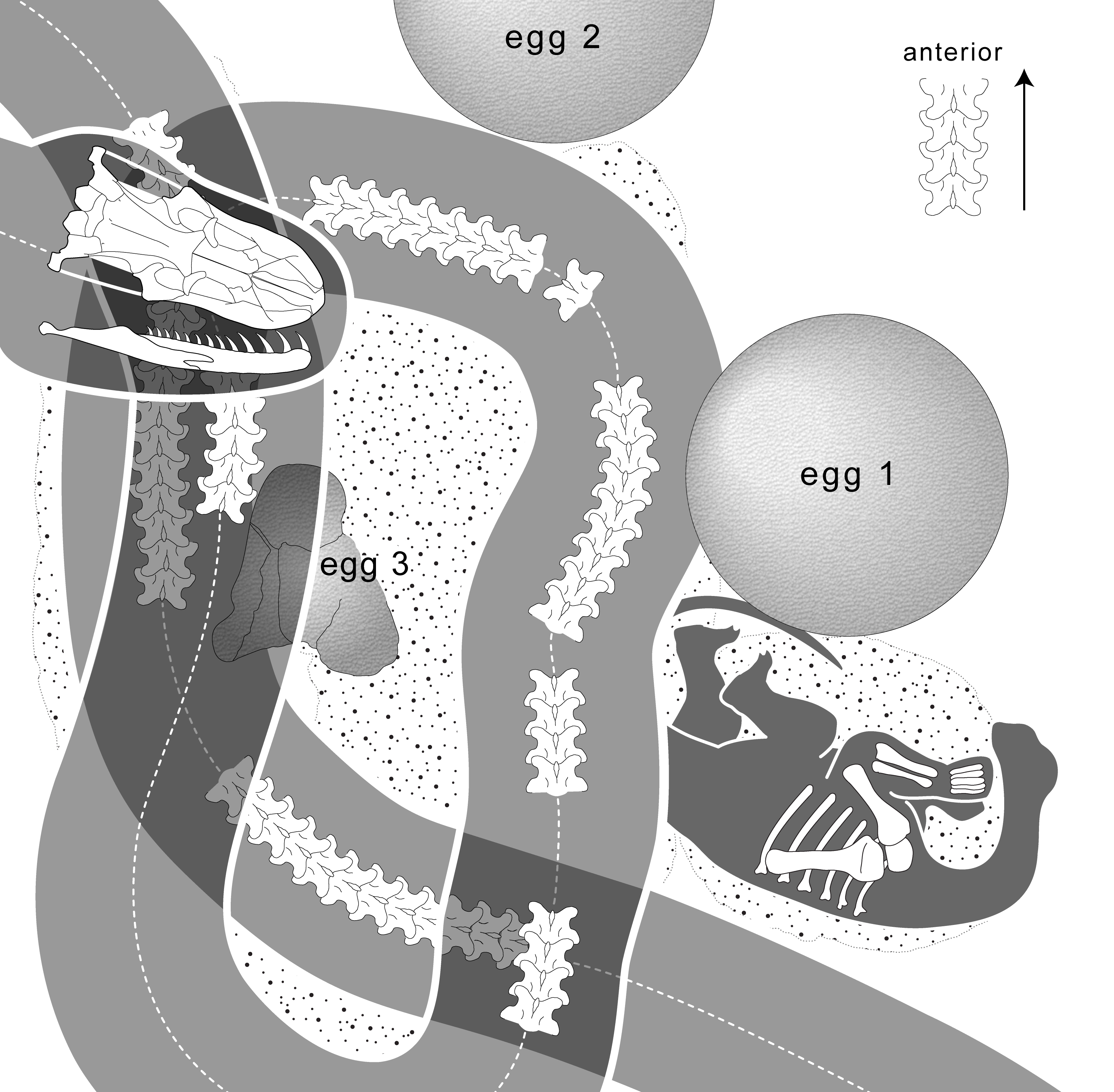
Diagram of the fossil snake Sanajeh as found, coiled with sauropod eggs and nestlings

Egg predation may be an ancient feeding strategy. A fossil of the Late Cretaceous snake Sanajeh of western India, found coiled around an egg and a hatchling sauropod dinosaur, was most likely a predator of sauropod nest sites including of eggs. Sanajeh was about 3.5 metres (11 ft) in length; its skull was 95 millimetres (3.7 in) long. Oviraptor was a late Cretaceous dinosaur; it was given its name, meaning "egg thief", as it was initially thought to be an egg predator; later, it was discovered to have been brooding its own eggs, and its toothless jaws have been reinterpreted as adapted to a different diet, perhaps of leaves.

Sauropod dinosaurs, some of the largest animals that have ever lived, appear surprisingly to have followed an r-selected reproductive strategy, producing a large number of hard-shelled eggs. This contrasts with the K-selected strategy in whales, which are marine mammals of comparable size. Whales produce few eggs which develop internally, receiving a high level of parental investment. A possible cause is that egg size is limited: extrapolating from the sizes of bird eggs relative to adult body weight, a 10 tonne sauropod would produce eggs weighing some 333 kilograms, far over the limit (around 10 kilograms) which an egg shell could support. If that is correct, then sauropods inevitably had to follow an r-selected strategy with many relatively small eggs, not specifically a response to egg predation.

== Interaction with humans ==
=== Damage to commercial fisheries ===
Among fish, egg predation by species such as haddock (Melanogrammus aeglefinus) can contribute to the decline in commercially-important fish populations such as of Atlantic herring (Clupea harengus). This effect can be important in attempts to restore fisheries damaged by overfishing.

=== Introduced and invasive species ===
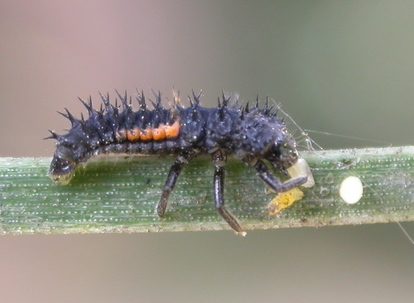
3rd instar larva of Harmonia axyridis eating an egg of another ladybird species (probably Adalia)

Invasive species frequently prey on eggs and young of native species. The harlequin ladybird Harmonia axyridis eats eggs of species including other ladybirds, such as the two-spot ladybird Adalia bipunctata. Females of the prey species laid eggs with higher amounts of defensive alkaloids when egg predation was occurring.

Egg predation is an especially severe threat to colonies of ground-nesting seabirds. These have often selected offshore islands as nest sites, as the islands historically had fewer predators than the mainland. Accidental introductions of predator species have upset seabird reproduction, as the predators have a concentrated supply of food in the form of eggs on the ground or in burrows, and can increase rapidly. Offshore island populations in Australasia have been widely affected by exotic species such as rats, arriving by ship from Eurasia. Native species, such as blotched blue-tongue lizards, Tiliqua nigrolutea, and water-rats, Hydromys chrysogaster, may also have an impact on seabirds like the short-tailed shearwater, Ardenna tenuirostris on islands off Tasmania, though predation rates were relatively low. Eggs were usually taken when burrows were unattended, implying that the parent birds were able to defend their eggs effectively against these predators.

=== Control of egg predators ===
Where populations of concern are threatened by egg predators, conservationists may attempt to control the predators so as to allow the prey species to recover. In the case of bird predators, one approach has been to put out bait eggs treated with the slow-acting avicide DRC-1339. This has for example controlled ravens which threatened ground-nesting sage grouse, and among seabirds, gulls which threatened nesting tern colonies. Sea turtles breed by laying and burying their eggs on nesting beaches, so the control of egg predators at these sites may be effective in assisting the recovery of turtle populations.

== See also ==
- Oophagy
- Balut
- Seed predation
