= Bird egg =

Component of avian reproduction

A diagram of a bird egg

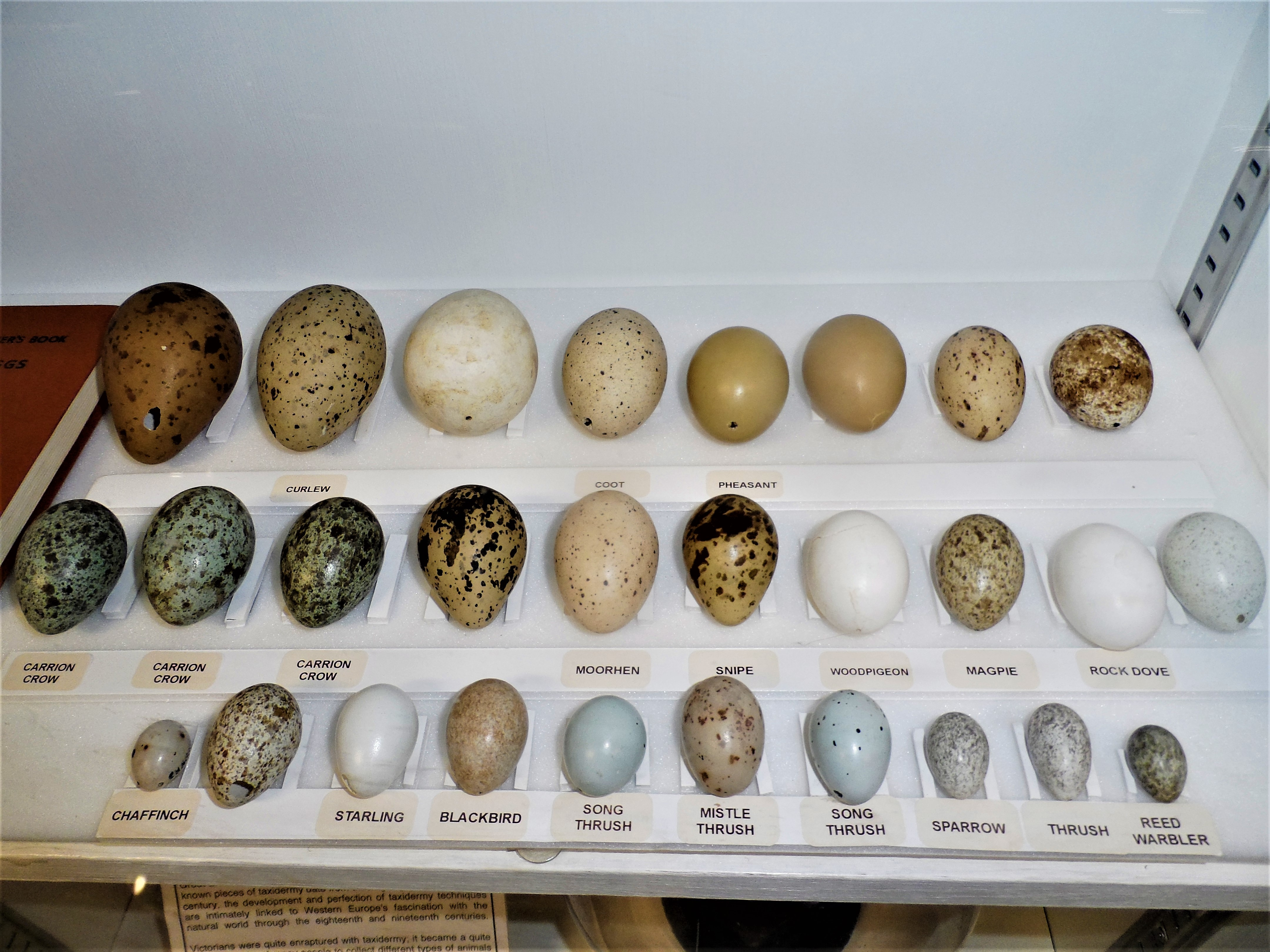
Eggs of various birds, labelled (Trinity College Zoological Museum, Dublin)

A bird egg is the reproductive structure produced by female birds, consisting of a hard, calcareous shell that encloses nutrient-dense yolk, protective albumen, and embryonic membranes, providing a self-contained environment for embryonic development and hatching. Bird eggs range in quantity from one (as in condors) to up to seventeen (the grey partridge). Clutch size may vary latitudinally within a species. Some birds lay eggs even when the eggs have not been fertilized; it is not uncommon for pet owners to find their lone bird nesting on a clutch of infertile eggs, which are sometimes called wind-eggs.

== Anatomy ==
All bird eggs contain the following components:

- The embryo is the immature developing chick
- The amnion is a membrane that initially covers the embryo and eventually fills with amniotic fluid, provides the embryo with protection against shock from movement
- The allantois helps the embryo obtain oxygen and handles metabolic waste
- The chorion, together with the amnion, forms the amniotic sac and encloses the amnion, vitellus, and the embryo
- The vitellus, or yolk, is the nutrient-bearing portion of the egg, containing most of its fat, minerals, and many of its proteins and blood vessels
- The albumen is made up of globular proteins called ovalbumin which contain over half of the egg's protein; its function is considered unknown
- The porous shell which allows oxygen to enter the egg while keeping unwanted fluids and contaminants out

== Colors ==
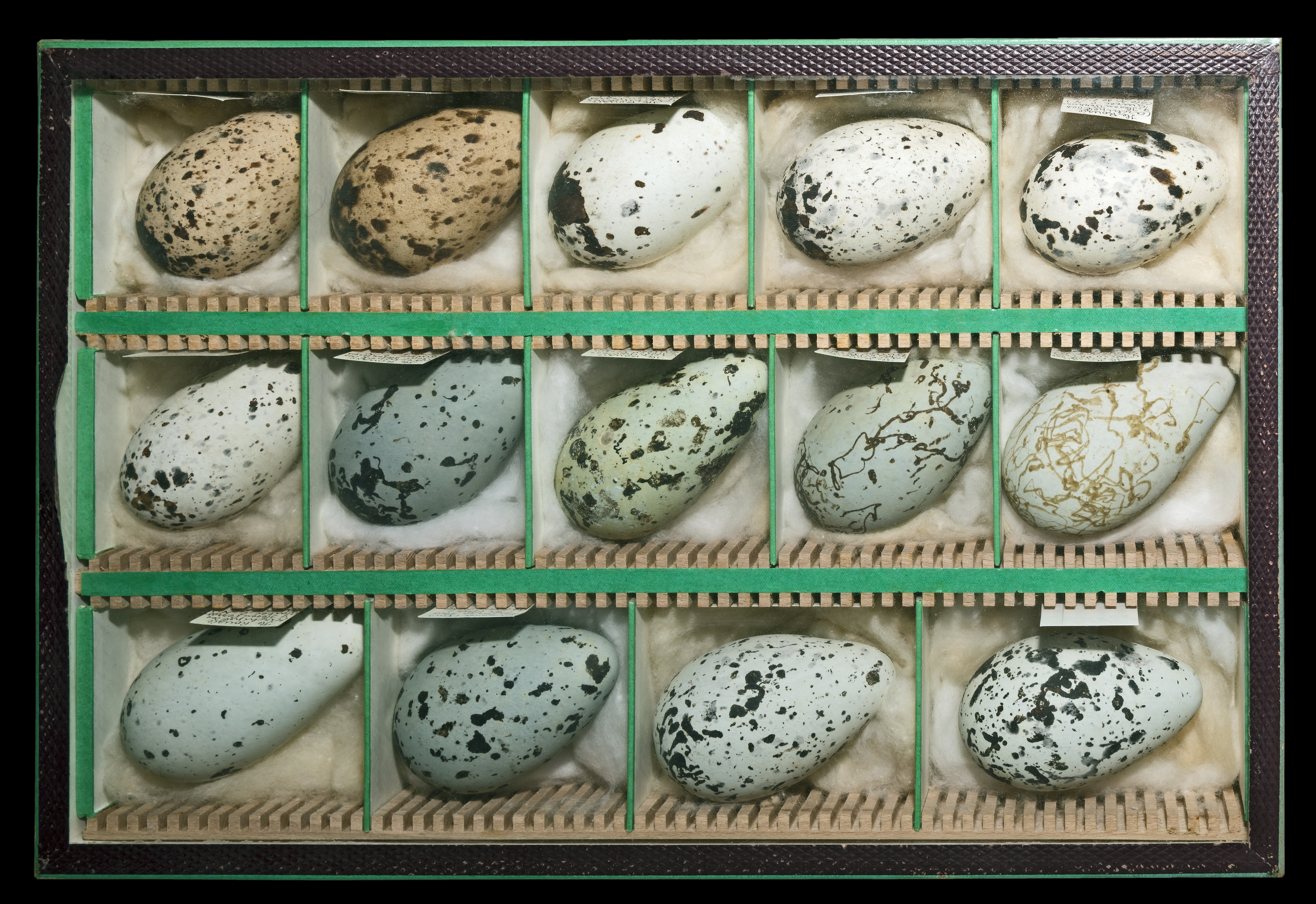
Guillemot eggs

The default color of vertebrate eggs is the white of the calcium carbonate from which the shells are made, but some birds, mainly passerines, produce colored eggs. The pigments biliverdin and its zinc chelate give a green or blue ground color, and protoporphyrin produces reds and browns as a ground color or as spotting. Non-passerines typically have white eggs, except in some ground-nesting groups, such as the Charadriiformes, sandgrouse and nightjars, where camouflage is necessary, and some parasitic cuckoos, which lay eggs that often closely match the passerine host's egg. To varying degrees of success, host passerine species have combined speckles, blotches and other egg markings with visual pattern-recognition abilities to help them reject cuckoos' counterfeit eggs. Most other passerines, in contrast, lay colored eggs, even if there is no need of cryptic colors.

However, the photographic markings on passerine eggs have been suggested to reduce brittleness by acting as a solid state lubricant. If insufficient calcium is available in the local soil, the egg shell may be thin, especially in a circle around the broad end. Protoporphyrin speckling compensates for this, and increases inversely to the amount of calcium in the soil. To understand the functional significance of eggshell spotting (or maculation) it is important to quantify this pigmentation For the same reason, later eggs in a clutch are more spotted than early ones, as the female's store of calcium is depleted.

Birds which build in trees generally have blue or greenish eggs, either spotted or unspotted, while birds that build in bushes or near or on the ground are likely to lay speckled eggs. The color of individual eggs is also genetically influenced, and appears to be inherited through the mother only, suggesting the gene responsible for pigmentation is on the female-specific W chromosome (female birds are WZ, males are ZZ). Color was once thought to be applied to the shell immediately before laying, but this research shows coloration is an integral part of the development of the shell, with the same protein responsible for depositing calcium carbonate, or protoporphyrins when there is a lack of that mineral.

In species such as the common guillemot, which nest in large groups, each female's eggs have very different markings, making it easier for females to identify their own eggs on the crowded cliff ledges on which they breed.

== Shell ==
Bird eggshells are diverse. For example:

- Cormorant eggs are rough and chalky
- Tinamou eggs are shiny
- Duck eggs are oily and waterproof
- Cassowary eggs are heavily pitted

Tiny pores in a bird eggshell allow the embryo to breathe. The domestic hen's egg has around 7500 pores.

== Shape ==
The shape of eggs varies considerably across bird species, ranging from near-spherical (such as those of the little bee-eater) to highly pyriform or conical (such as those of the common murre) with the familiar shape of the chicken egg lying in between. Early scientific investigators of egg shape suggested that the oval shape of eggs was caused by the egg being forced through the oviduct by peristalsis. In this often-repeated but incorrect theory of egg shape formation, the contraction and relaxation of the muscles which push the egg down the oviduct cause the spherical egg membrane to distort slightly into an ovoid shape, with the blunt end caudal (i.e. furthest down the oviduct and closest to the cloaca). The calcification of the egg in the shell gland/uterus then fixes it in this shape, and the egg is laid with the blunt end appearing first (for a diagram showing the different sections of the bird oviduct, see here).

However, this theory has been refuted by studies of egg shell formation in a number of bird species using techniques such as X-ray photography which have demonstrated that egg shape is determined in the oviduct isthmus (before shell calcification) with the pointed end caudal (furthest down the oviduct). These observations cannot be explained by peristalsis. It has been proposed that the egg acquires its shape (with the pointed egg caudal) as it is forced through the narrow isthmus, but this assertion has not been thoroughly verified.

Cliff-nesting birds often have highly conical eggs. They are less likely to roll off, tending instead to roll around in a tight circle; this trait is likely to have arisen due to evolution via natural selection. In contrast, many hole-nesting birds have nearly spherical eggs.

The shape has biological significance. A pointed egg will tend to sit on its side, with the big end tipped upward. The big end contains the air sac and its shell is pierced by a higher density of pores than the more pointed end. Tipping the big end upwards improves oxygen flow to the large head, with the physiologically demanding eyes and brain, that develops in the big end while the tail develops at the more pointed end.

In a 2017 publication in the journal Science, mathematical modeling of 50,000 bird eggs data showed that bird egg shape is a product of flight adaptations and not the outcome of nesting conditions or a bird's life history. A strong correlation was found between egg shape and flight ability on broad taxonomic scales, such that birds engaging in high powered flights usually maximize egg size by having elliptical shaped eggs while maintaining a streamlined body plan. Selection acting during incubation, such as breeding site and incubation posture, are also thought to influence egg-shape variation across birds.

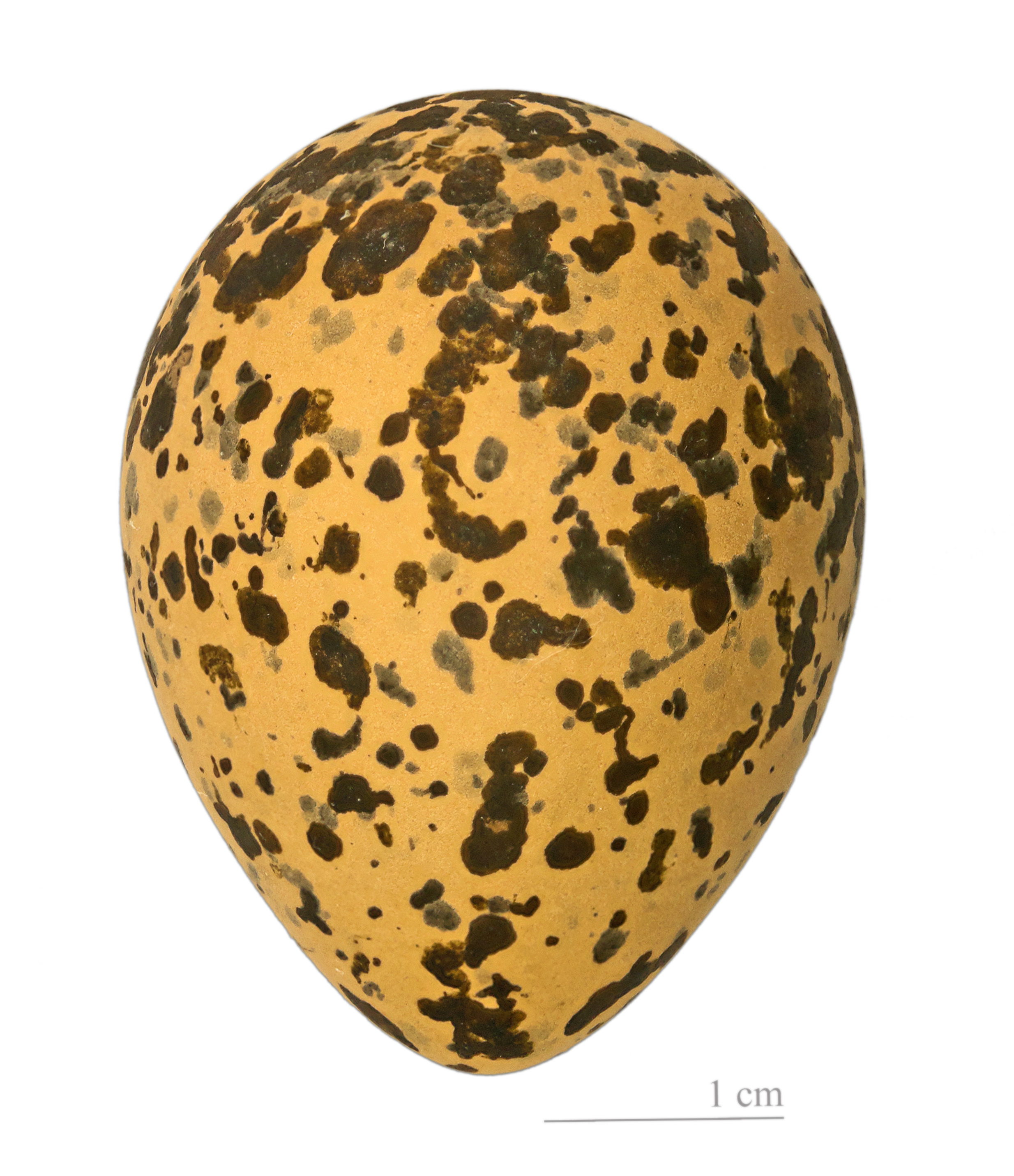
Classic oval bird egg (Spur-winged lapwing)

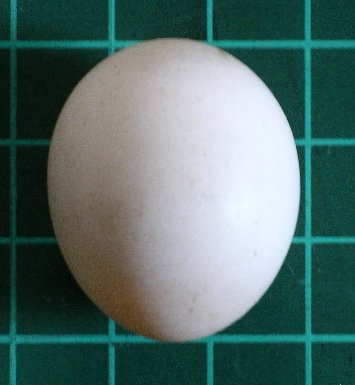
Almost spherical bird egg (Senegal parrot)

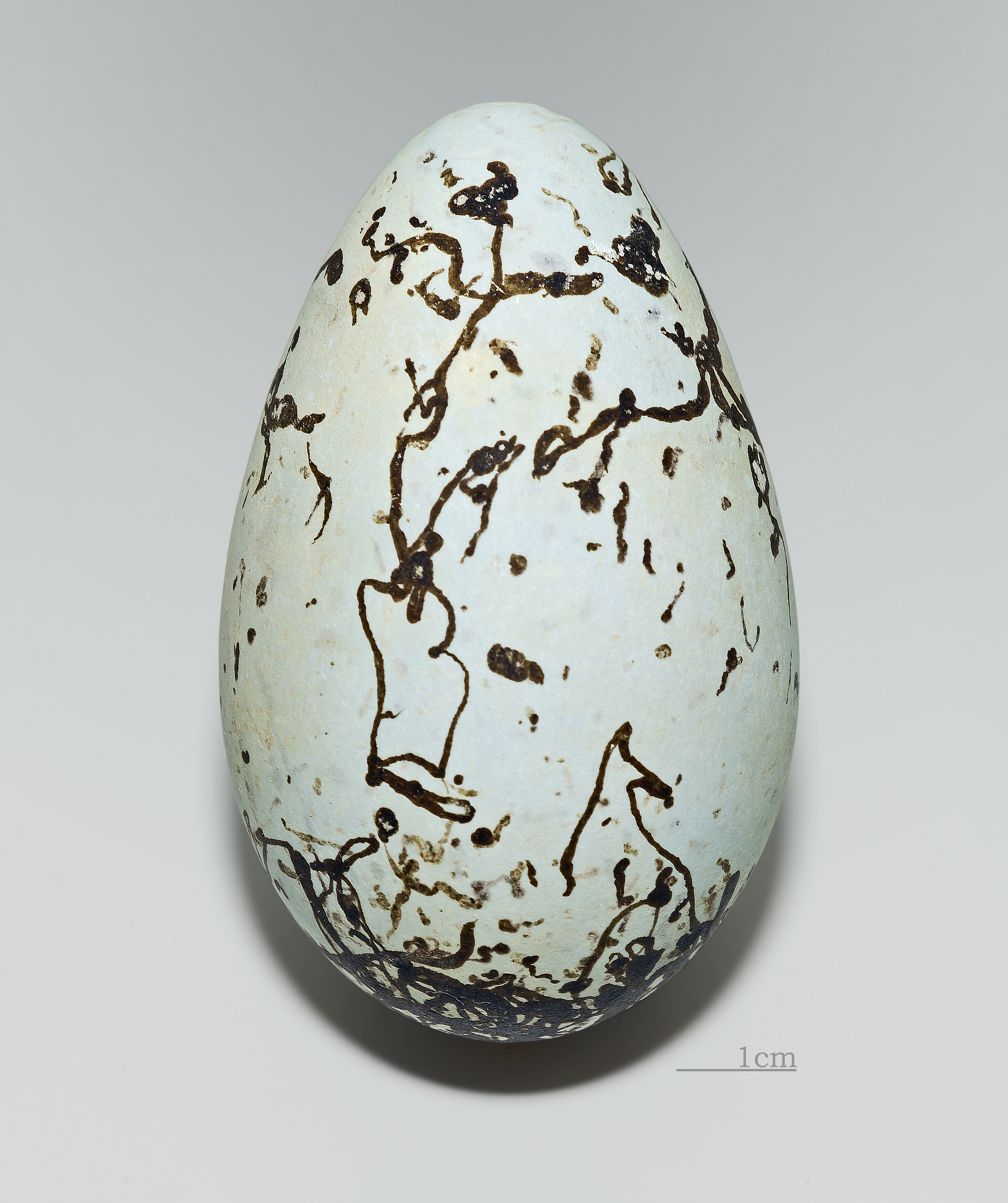
Long, "elliptical" bird egg (Common murre)

== Size ==
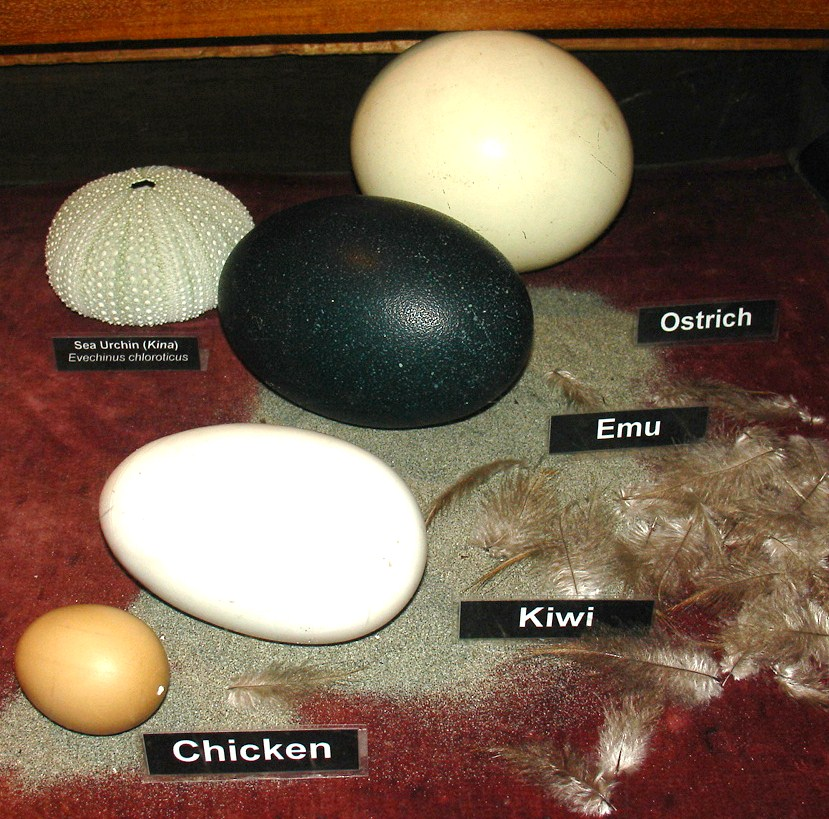
Eggs of: ostrich, emu, kiwi and chicken

Egg size tends to be proportional to the size of the adult bird, from the half gram egg of the bee hummingbird to the 1.5 kg egg of the ostrich. Kiwis have disproportionately large eggs, up to 20% of the female's body weight. This evolutionary trait results in kiwi chicks that can emerge from the nest days after hatching, ready to start foraging for food.

== Number ==
The number of eggs laid in a single brood is referred to as the clutch. Clutch size is usually within a small range of variation. Some birds respond to the accidental loss of eggs by laying a replacement egg. Others will stop laying based on the apparent size of the clutch. According to whether they respond to addition, removal, or both addition and removal of eggs, birds are classified as determinate layers (number of eggs laid is predetermined and do not respond to change) or as indeterminate layers. In general, birds with small clutch size tended to be indeterminate.

== Predation ==
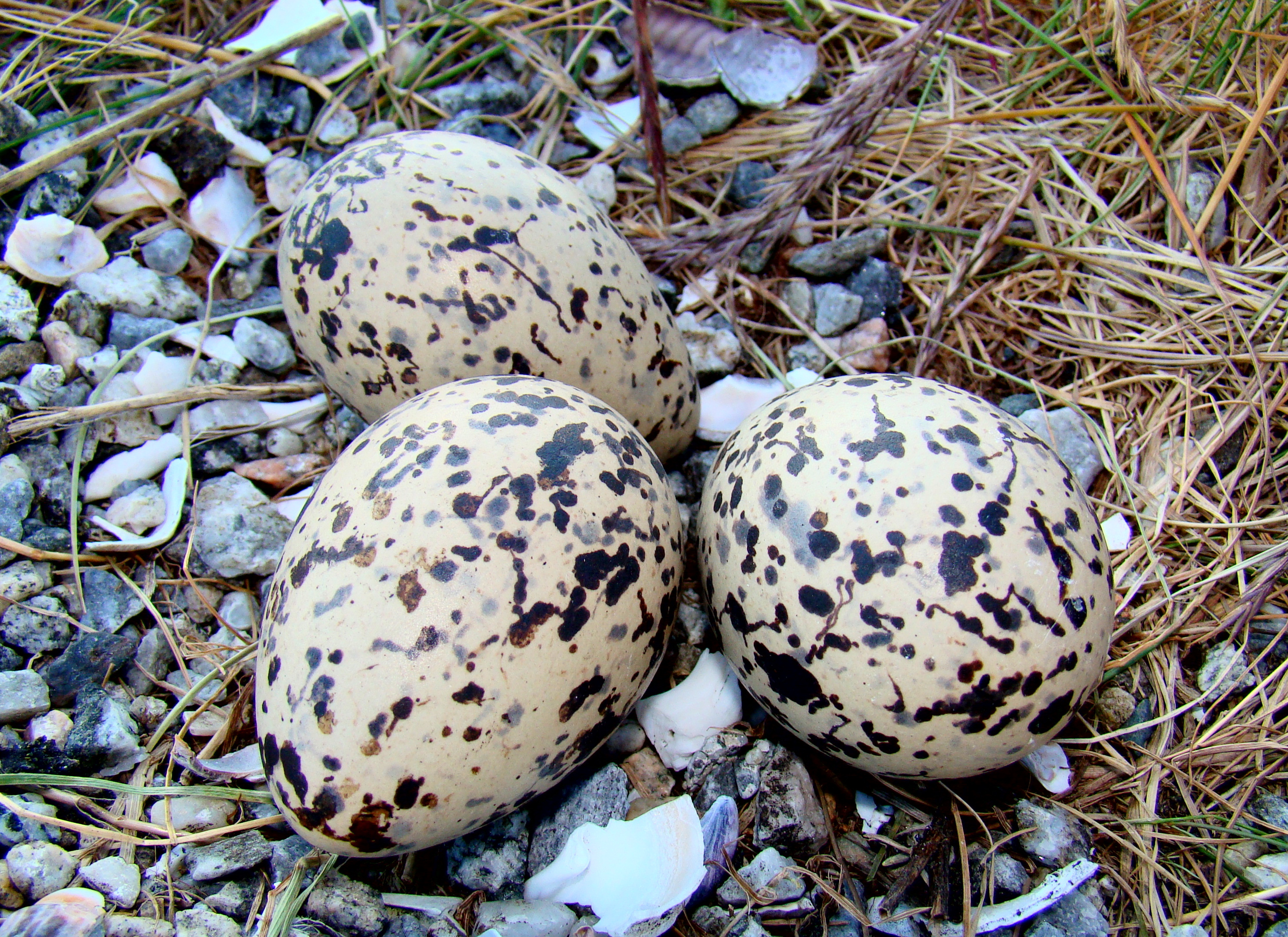
Eurasian oystercatcher eggs camouflaged in the nest

Many animals feed on eggs. For example, the principal predators of the black oystercatcher's eggs include raccoons, skunks, mink, river and sea otters, gulls, crows and foxes. The stoat (Mustela erminea) and long-tailed weasel (Neogale frenata) steal ducks' eggs. Ostrich eggs are vulnerable to many predators ranging from mongooses and Egyptian vultures, to hyenas. Snakes of the genera Dasypeltis and Elachistodon specialize in eating eggs. Humans have a long history of eating eggs, both wild bird eggs and farm-raised bird eggs.

Brood parasitism occurs in birds when one species lays its eggs in the nest of another. In some cases, the host's eggs are removed or eaten by the female, or expelled by her chick. Brood parasites include cowbirds, honeyguides, and many Old World cuckoos.

== Evolutionary history, dinosaur eggs ==
Today, the hard shells of bird eggs are unique among animals. However, this trait evolved in dinosaurs, the larger group to which birds belong. A bird egg is thus a dinosaur egg. Eggs of the modern type, with an inner mammillary, more outer prismatic and an outer crystalline layer, appear during the Jurassic and are associated with fossils of the Maniraptora.

== See also ==
- Oology

== Further references ==
- Attenborough, D. 1998. The Life of Birds. BBC p. 218. ISBN 0563-38792-0
