= Alessandra Giliani =

Fictional Italian anatomist

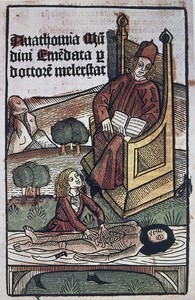
- Anathomia corporis humani title page (Leipzig edition dated 1493)
- Born: 1307; San Giovanni in Persiceto, Emilia-Romagna, Italy
- Died: 1326 (aged 18–19)
- Known for: Anatomy
- Scientific career
- Fields: Anatomist

Alessandra Giliani is a fictional Italian scientist, invented by Alessandro Macchiavelli, a well-known eighteenth-century forger from Bologna.. She is reputed to have worked as a prosector, preparing corpses for anatomical study, under the famed anatomist Mondino de Luzzi at the University of Bologna; Due to the lack of records on Giliani (as well as on other Medieval women popularly connected to the University of Bologna), a number of modern historians, such as Paula Findlan, argue that Giliani was invented by notorious forger and pseudo-historian Alessandro Macchiavelli in the 18th Century; indeed, doubts had been expressed as early as 1857 in Michele Medici's History of the Bolognese School of Anatomy.

== Early life and education ==
Giliani is believed to have been born in 1307, in San Giovanni in Persiceto, in the Italian province of Emilia-Romagna. She is said to have served as an assistant to de' Liuizzi specializing in dissection demonstrations as a prosector, an anatomist who prepares corpses for dissection in academic settings. Given her reported death at the age of 19, her involvement in anatomical studies would have occurred during her late teens. In 1316, de' Liuizzi published a seminal text on the subject entitled, Anathomia corporis humani.The earliest edition of the work was printed in Padua between 1475 and 1478.

Anathomia illustration, Mondino dei Liuzzi, published in 1541

== Personal life ==
According to some accounts, Giliani may have been engaged to Otto Angenius before her death at the age of 19.

== Legacy ==
Due to the lack of evidence of her existence, scholars consider her to be a fiction invented in the 18th Century by Alessandro Machiavelli (1693–1766) as a way of promoting the case for women students at Bologna. Barbara Quick's novel, A Golden Web, published by HarperTeen in 2010, is historical fiction based on the character of Alessandra Giliani. Giliani is among the 1,038 women honored in Judy Chicago's renowned art installation The Dinner Party.

== Sources ==
- Castiglioni, Arturo (1941). A History of Medicine. Translated by Krumbhaar, E.B. New York: Knopf.
