= Dasypeltis sahelensis =

Conservation status
- Least Concern (IUCN 3.1)

Scientific classification
- Kingdom: Animalia
- Phylum: Chordata
- Class: Reptilia
- Order: Squamata
- Suborder: Serpentes
- Family: Colubridae
- Genus: Dasypeltis
- Species: D. sahelensis

Binomial name
- Dasypeltis sahelensis J. Trape & Mané, 2006

Species of snake

Dasypeltis sahelensis, the Sahel egg-eater, is a species of non-venomous snake in the family Colubridae. The species is found in Senegal, Mali, Burkina Faso, Niger, Nigeria, Morocco, Western Sahara, Mauritania, and Chad. As of 2021, D. sahelensis is classified as Least Concern by the IUCN because it is widespread throughout its range and there are no known conservation threats.
