= Dasypeltis arabica =

Scientific classification
- Kingdom: Animalia
- Phylum: Chordata
- Class: Reptilia
- Order: Squamata
- Suborder: Serpentes
- Family: Colubridae
- Genus: Dasypeltis
- Species: D. arabica

Binomial name
- Dasypeltis arabica Bates & Broadley, 2018

Species of snake

Dasypeltis arabica, commonly known as the Arabian egg-eater, is a species of non-venomous snake in the family Colubridae. The species is found in Saudi Arabia and Yemen.
