= Dasypeltis loveridgei =

Scientific classification
- Kingdom: Animalia
- Phylum: Chordata
- Class: Reptilia
- Order: Squamata
- Suborder: Serpentes
- Family: Colubridae
- Genus: Dasypeltis
- Species: D. loveridgei

Binomial name
- Dasypeltis loveridgei Mertens, 1954

Species of snake

Dasypeltis loveridgei, commonly known as the dwarf egg-eater, is a species of non-venomous snake in the family Colubridae. The species is found in South Africa and Namibia.
