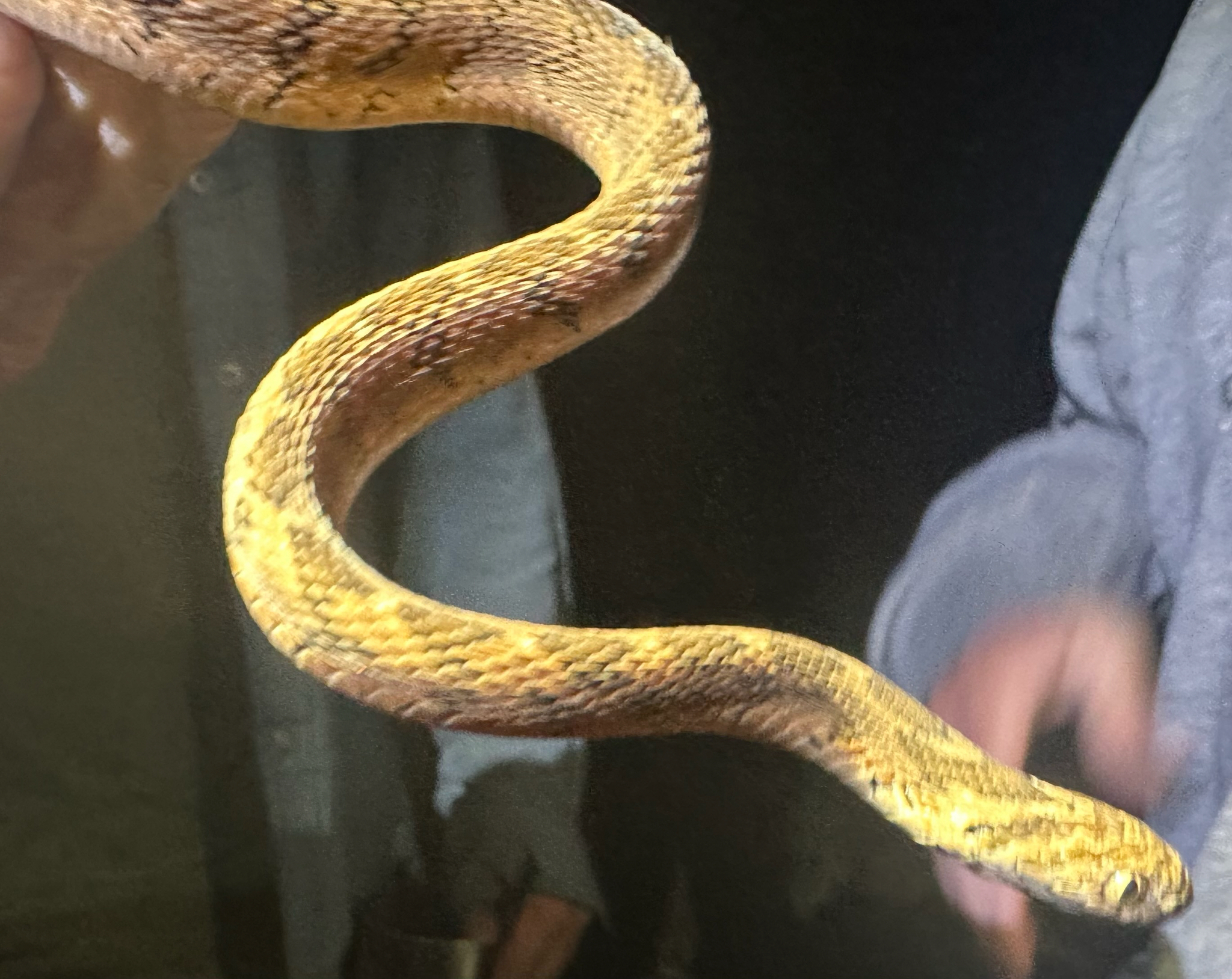

Conservation status
- Least Concern (IUCN 3.1)

Scientific classification
- Kingdom: Animalia
- Phylum: Chordata
- Class: Reptilia
- Order: Squamata
- Suborder: Serpentes
- Family: Colubridae
- Genus: Dasypeltis
- Species: D. confusa

Binomial name
- Dasypeltis confusa Trape & Mané, 2006

= Dasypeltis confusa =

Species of snake

Dasypeltis confusa, commonly known as the confusing egg-eater or the diamond-back egg-eater, is a species of snake in the family Colubridae. The species is endemic to Africa.

== Geographic range ==
D. confusa is found in Benin, Cameroon, Chad, Ethiopia, Gabon, Ghana, Guinea, Guinea-Bissau, Ivory Coast, Kenya, Liberia, Mali, Nigeria, Rwanda, Senegal, Sierra Leone, South Sudan, Togo, and Uganda.

== Habitat ==
The preferred habitat of D. confusa is savanna at altitudes of 500–1,200 m (1,600–3,900 ft).

== Reproduction ==
D. confusa is oviparous.
