= Dasypeltis latericia =

Conservation status
- Least Concern (IUCN 3.1)

Scientific classification
- Kingdom: Animalia
- Phylum: Chordata
- Class: Reptilia
- Order: Squamata
- Suborder: Serpentes
- Family: Colubridae
- Genus: Dasypeltis
- Species: D. latericia

Binomial name
- Dasypeltis latericia J. Trape & Mané, 2006

Species of snake

Dasypeltis latericia is a species of non-venomous snake in the family Colubridae. The species is found in Senegal, Guinea, and Mali.
