= Dasypeltis abyssina =

Conservation status
- Least Concern (IUCN 3.1)

Scientific classification
- Kingdom: Animalia
- Phylum: Chordata
- Class: Reptilia
- Order: Squamata
- Suborder: Serpentes
- Family: Colubridae
- Genus: Dasypeltis
- Species: D. abyssina

Binomial name
- Dasypeltis abyssina (A.M.C. Duméril, Bibron, & A.H.A. Duméril, 1854)

Species of snake

Dasypeltis abyssina, commonly known as the Ethiopian egg-eater, is a species of non-venomous snake in the family Colubridae. The species is endemic to Ethiopia.
