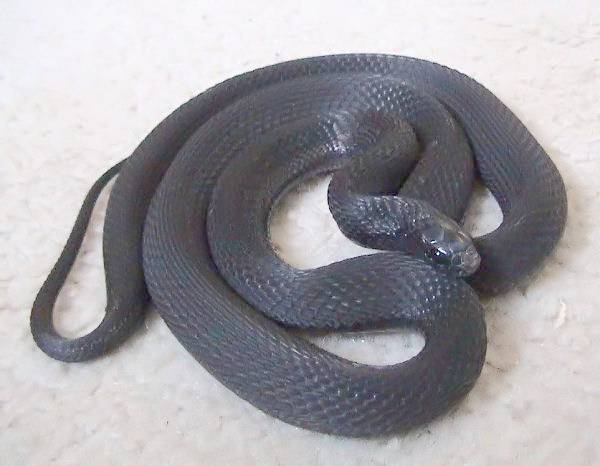

Conservation status
- Least Concern (IUCN 3.1)

Scientific classification
- Kingdom: Animalia
- Phylum: Chordata
- Class: Reptilia
- Order: Squamata
- Suborder: Serpentes
- Family: Colubridae
- Genus: Dasypeltis
- Species: D. atra

Binomial name
- Dasypeltis atra Sternfeld, 1912

Synonyms
- Dasypelis scabra var. atra Sternfeld, 1912; Dasypeltis atra — Gans, 1964

= Dasypeltis atra =

Species of snake

Dasypeltis atra, commonly known as the African egg-eating snake or montane egg-eater, is a species of non-venomous snake in the family Colubridae. The species is endemic to Africa.

== Geographic range ==
D. atra is found in Burundi, the Democratic Republic of the Congo, Ethiopia, Kenya, Rwanda, South Sudan, Tanzania, and Uganda.

== Reproduction ==
D. atra is oviparous.
