= Dasypeltis palmarum =

Conservation status
- Least Concern (IUCN 3.1)

Scientific classification
- Kingdom: Animalia
- Phylum: Chordata
- Class: Reptilia
- Order: Squamata
- Suborder: Serpentes
- Family: Colubridae
- Genus: Dasypeltis
- Species: D. palmarum

Binomial name
- Dasypeltis palmarum (Leach, 1818)

Species of snake

Dasypeltis palmarum, commonly known as the palm egg-eater, is a non-venomous species of snake in the family Colubridae. It is found in Angola, the Republic of the Congo, and the Democratic Republic of the Congo.
