= Dasypeltis bazi =

Scientific classification
- Kingdom: Animalia
- Phylum: Chordata
- Class: Reptilia
- Order: Squamata
- Suborder: Serpentes
- Family: Colubridae
- Genus: Dasypeltis
- Species: D. bazi

Binomial name
- Dasypeltis bazi Saleh & Sarhan, 2016

Species of snake

Dasypeltis bazi, commonly known as the Egyptian egg-eating snake or Baz's egg-eating snake, is a species of non-venomous snake in the family Colubridae. The species is found in Egypt. It eats the eggs of birds.
