= Dasypeltis congolensis =

Scientific classification
- Kingdom: Animalia
- Phylum: Chordata
- Class: Reptilia
- Order: Squamata
- Suborder: Serpentes
- Family: Colubridae
- Genus: Dasypeltis
- Species: D. congolensis

Binomial name
- Dasypeltis congolensis Trape, Mediannikov, Chirio, & Chirio, 2021

Species of snake

Dasypeltis congolensis is a species of non-venomous snake in the family Colubridae. The species is found in the Republic of Congo, Democratic Republic of Congo, Gabon, Angola, and Zambia.
