= Dasypeltis parascabra =

Conservation status
- Least Concern (IUCN 3.1)

Scientific classification
- Kingdom: Animalia
- Phylum: Chordata
- Class: Reptilia
- Order: Squamata
- Suborder: Serpentes
- Family: Colubridae
- Genus: Dasypeltis
- Species: D. parascabra

Binomial name
- Dasypeltis parascabra S. Trape, Mediannikov, & J. Trape, 2012

Species of snake

Dasypeltis parascabra is a species of non-venomous snake in the family Colubridae. The species is found in Guinea, Ivory Coast, Liberia, Ghana, Togo, and Nigeria.
