= Dasypeltis gansi =

Conservation status
- Least Concern (IUCN 3.1)

Scientific classification
- Kingdom: Animalia
- Phylum: Chordata
- Class: Reptilia
- Order: Squamata
- Suborder: Serpentes
- Family: Colubridae
- Genus: Dasypeltis
- Species: D. gansi

Binomial name
- Dasypeltis gansi J. Trape & Mané, 2006

Species of snake

Dasypeltis gansi, commonly known as Gans's egg-eater or Gans' egg-eating snake, is a species of non-venomous snake in the family Colubridae. The species is native to West Africa.

== Etymology ==
The specific name, gansi, is in honor of American herpetologist Carl Gans.

== Geographic range ==
D. gansi is found in Benin, Burkina Faso, Cameroon, Chad, Gambia, Ghana, Guinea, Guinea-Bissau, Ivory Coast, Mali, Niger, Nigeria, the Republic of South Sudan, Senegal, Sudan, and Togo.

== Habitat ==
The preferred natural habitat of D. gansi is savanna, at altitudes from sea level to 600 m (2,000 ft).

== Description ==
Females of D. gansi may attain a total length (including tail) of about 92 cm (36 in) with the longest recorded specimen being 110.6 cm (43.5 in) long (including tail). Males are smaller, and may attain a total length of about 70 cm (28 in). Dorsal coloration is almost uniformly beige.

== Behavior ==
D. gansi is terrestrial and partly arboreal.

== Diet ==
The diet of D. gansi consists entirely of birds' eggs. They are capable of swallowing eggs 3-4 times larger than their head, possibly the largest gape of all snake species.

== Reproduction ==
D. gansi is oviparous.
