= Dasypeltis inornata =

Conservation status
- Least Concern (IUCN 3.1)

Scientific classification
- Kingdom: Animalia
- Phylum: Chordata
- Class: Reptilia
- Order: Squamata
- Suborder: Serpentes
- Family: Colubridae
- Genus: Dasypeltis
- Species: D. inornata

Binomial name
- Dasypeltis inornata Smith, 1849

Species of snake

Dasypeltis inornata, commonly known as the southern brown egg-eater, is a species of non-venomous snake in the family Colubridae. The species is found in South Africa and Eswatini.
