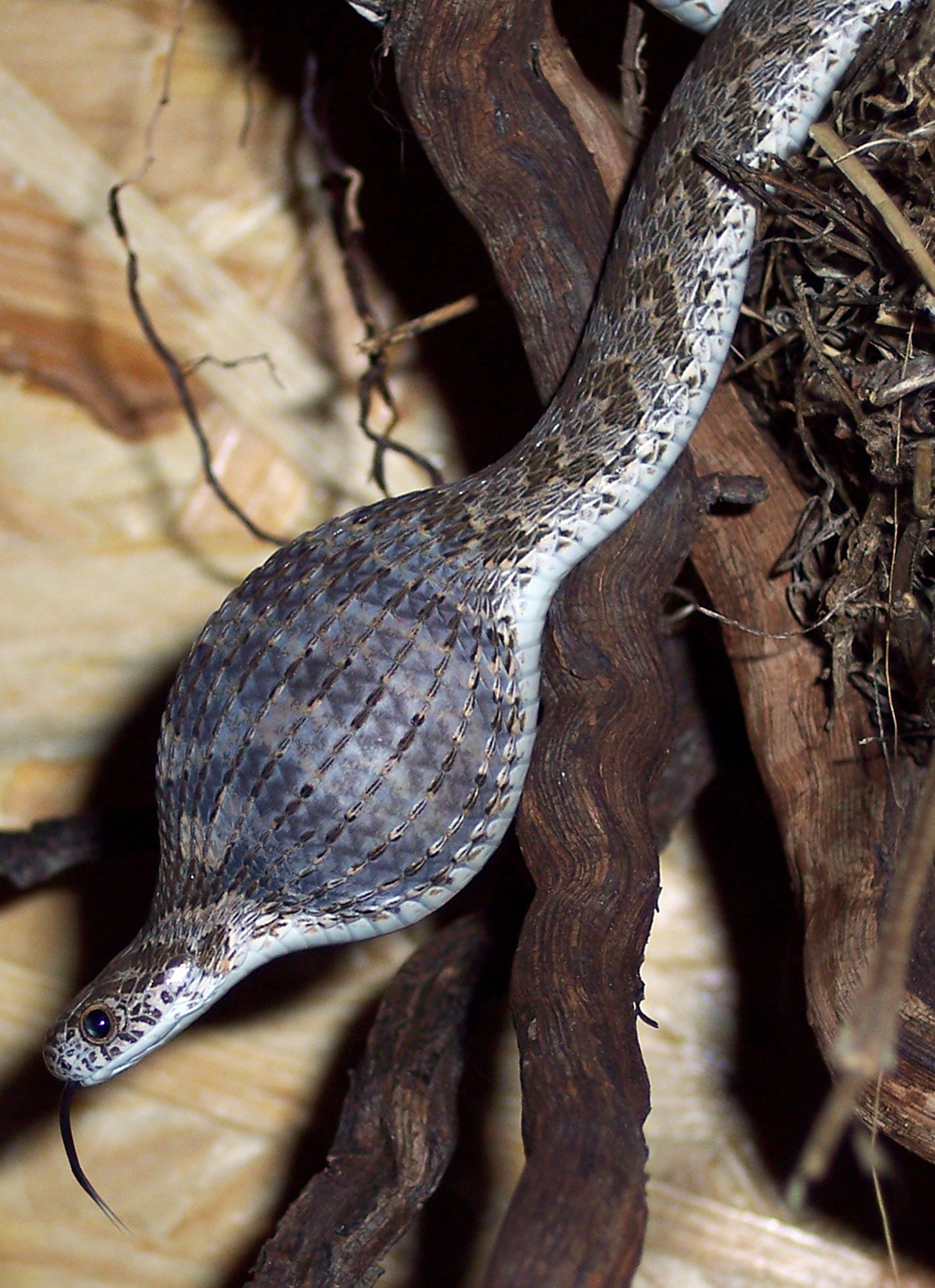
- D. scabra after swallowing an egg

Conservation status
- Least Concern (IUCN 3.1)

Scientific classification
- Kingdom: Animalia
- Phylum: Chordata
- Class: Reptilia
- Order: Squamata
- Suborder: Serpentes
- Family: Colubridae
- Genus: Dasypeltis
- Species: D. scabra

Binomial name
- Dasypeltis scabra (Linnaeus, 1758)

Synonyms
- Coluber scaber Linnaeus, 1758; Anodon typus A. Smith, 1829; Deirodon scaber — Owen, 1845; Rachiodon scaber — A.M.C. Duméril, Bibron & A.H.A. Duméril, 1854; Dasypeltis scabra — Günther, 1858

= Dasypeltis scabra =

Species of snake

Dasypeltis scabra, also known commonly as the common egg eater, the egg-eating snake, and the rhombic egg eater, is a species of snake in the family Colubridae. The species is endemic to Africa.

== Geographic range ==
D. scabra is found in sub-Saharan Africa.

== Description ==
D. scabra grows to a total length (tail included) of 40–46 inches (100–120 cm), and has almost toothless jaws. Dorsally, it has a series of rhomboidal dark brown spots on a lighter background. There is an alternating series of brown spots on each side and a distinct V-shaped mark at the back of the neck. Ventrally it is yellowish, either uniform or with dark dots.

== Mimicry ==
It has been suggested that non-venomous D. scabra is a mimic of venomous Echis carinatus, the saw-scaled viper, which it strongly resembles.

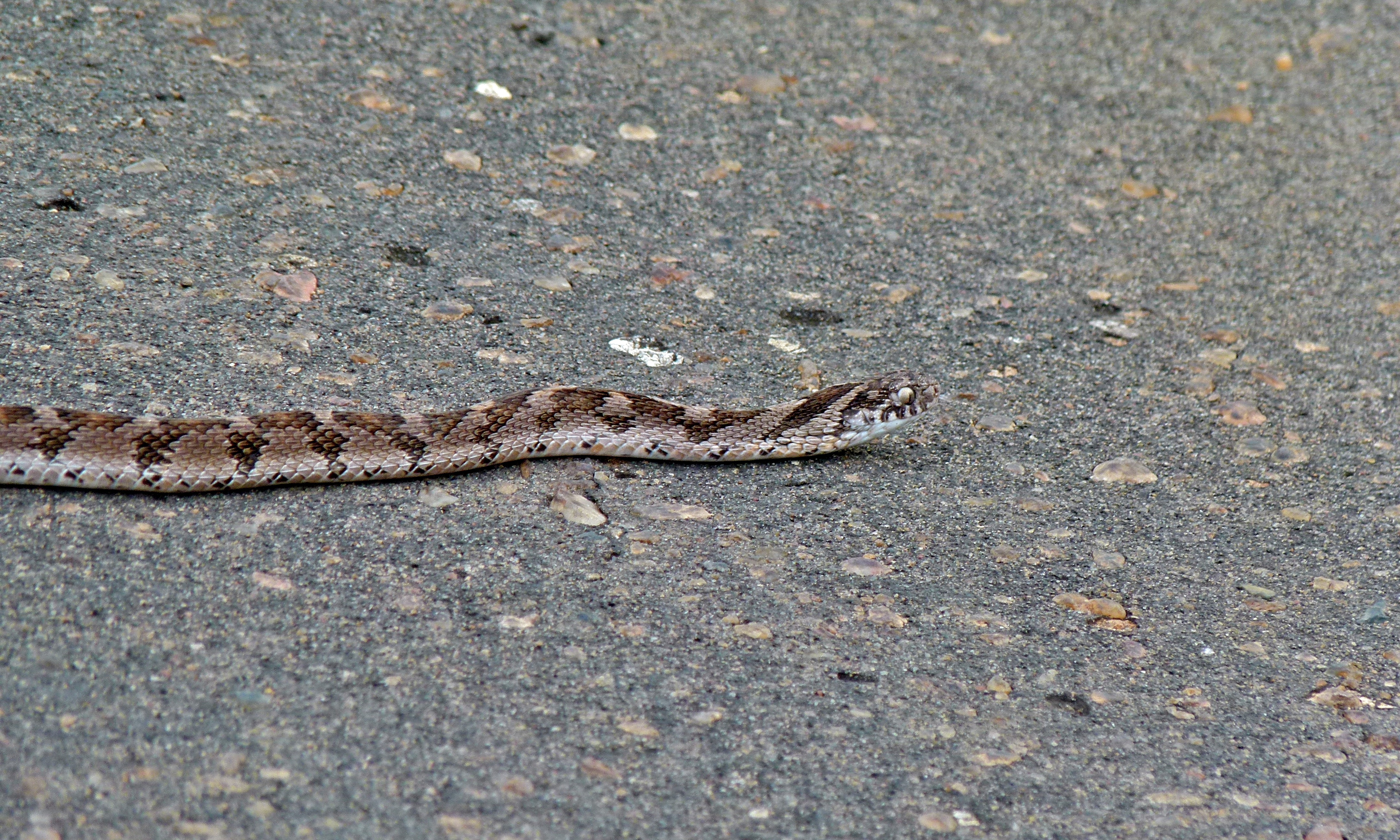
Dasypeltis scabra, showing the keeled scales on the flank, the typical colouration, and the position of the V-shaped marking on the neck.

Typical specimens of D. scabra even more closely resemble Causus rhombeatus, the rhombic night adder. The colouration of E. carinatus generally tends to be more reddish and brown, instead of shades of grey and black; and the V-shaped mark on its head is more patchy than in the other two species.

C. rhombeatus is not as slim as D. scabra, and its dorsal scales, unusual among viperids, are at most slightly keeled, whereas D. scabra scales not only are keeled, but in some parts of the body are finely saw-toothed so that, when an alarmed snake rubs them against each other, they emit a threatening hissing sound. The species does not hiss in the usual manner at all. Both species typically have well-defined V-shaped markings on the head and neck, but in C. rhombeatus the marking extends forward on the head, whereas in D. scabra it is mainly on the neck.

Furthermore, the two species also may be distinguished by the shape of the pupil of the eye. Snakes of the genus Dasypeltis have vertically slit pupils, whereas snakes of the genus Causus have round pupils. However, in dim light the vertical pupils expand till they are rounded, so this is not necessarily a reliable criterion for distinguishing the species.

== Habitat ==
D. scabra can be found in a variety of habitats, at altitudes from sea level to 2,600 m (8,500 ft). It is not found in closed-canopy forests nor in true deserts, but does inhabit most ecosystems between these extremes.

== Behavior ==
The rhombic egg eater is nocturnal. Although mainly terrestrial, it is a good climber and is known to scale rock outcroppings and climb trees to raid birds' nests.

== Diet ==
D. scabra feeds exclusively on eggs. The lining of the mouth has small, parallel ridges, very similar to human fingerprints, which aid in grasping the shell of an egg. Once swallowed, the egg is punctured by specialized vertebral hypapophyses which extend into the esophagus. The shell is then regurgitated in one piece, and its contents passed along to the stomach.

== Defense ==
When disturbed, D. scabra inflates itself, "hisses" by rapidly rubbing together the rough, keeled scales on the sides of its body, and strikes with its mouth kept wide open.

== Reproduction ==
D. scabra is oviparous. In summer, a sexually mature female may lay one or two clutches of 6–25 eggs each. The eggs measure 36 mm × 18 mm (1.42 in × 0.71 in). Hatchlings are 21–24 cm (8.5–9.5 in) in total length.
