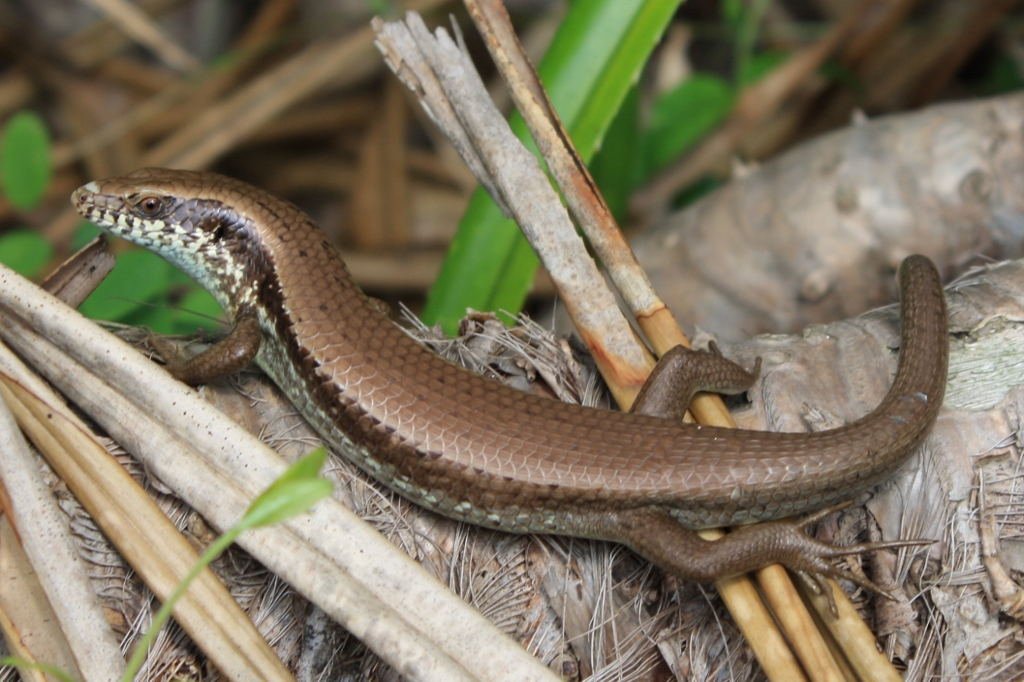

Conservation status
- Least Concern (IUCN 3.1)

Scientific classification
- Kingdom: Animalia
- Phylum: Chordata
- Order: Squamata
- Family: Scincidae
- Genus: Eutropis
- Species: E. longicaudata

Binomial name
- Eutropis longicaudata (Hallowell, 1857)

Synonyms
- Eumeces siamensis Günther 1864 (fide M.A. Smith 1935); Mabuia siamensis – Boulenger 1887: 188 (fide M.A. Smith 1935); Euprepes (Tiliqua) bicarinatus – W. Peters 1867: 22; Euprepes (Tiliqua) Ruhstrati – Fischer 1886: 7; Mabuia longicaudata – Boulenger 1887: 188; Mabuya longicaudata – Stejneger 1907: 214; Mabuya longicaudata – M.A. Smith 1935: 270; Mabuya longicaudata – Taylor 1963: 944; Mabuya longicaudata – Manthey & Grossmann 1997: 268; Mabuya longicaudata – Cox et al. 1998: 111; Mabuya longicaudata – Greer & Nussbaum 2000: 616; Eutropis longicaudata – Mausfeld et al. 2002; Mabuya longicaudata – Ziegler 2002: 193; Mabuya longicauda [sic] – Das & Yaakob 2007; Mabuya longicaudata – Bobrov & Semenov 2008; Eutropis longicaudata – Grismer 2011; Eutropis longicaudatus – Hecht et al. 2013

= Eutropis longicaudata =

Species of lizard

Eutropis longicaudata, the longtail mabuya or long-tailed sun skink, is a species of skink. It is found in southern China, Hong Kong, Taiwan, Laos, Vietnam, Thailand, Cambodia, and Peninsular Malaysia.

Some populations have been found to exhibit paternal care in response to predation by egg-eating snakes. Though some females are documented, to eat their clutch of eggs, when continually threatened by predators especially when threatened by O. formosanus.
