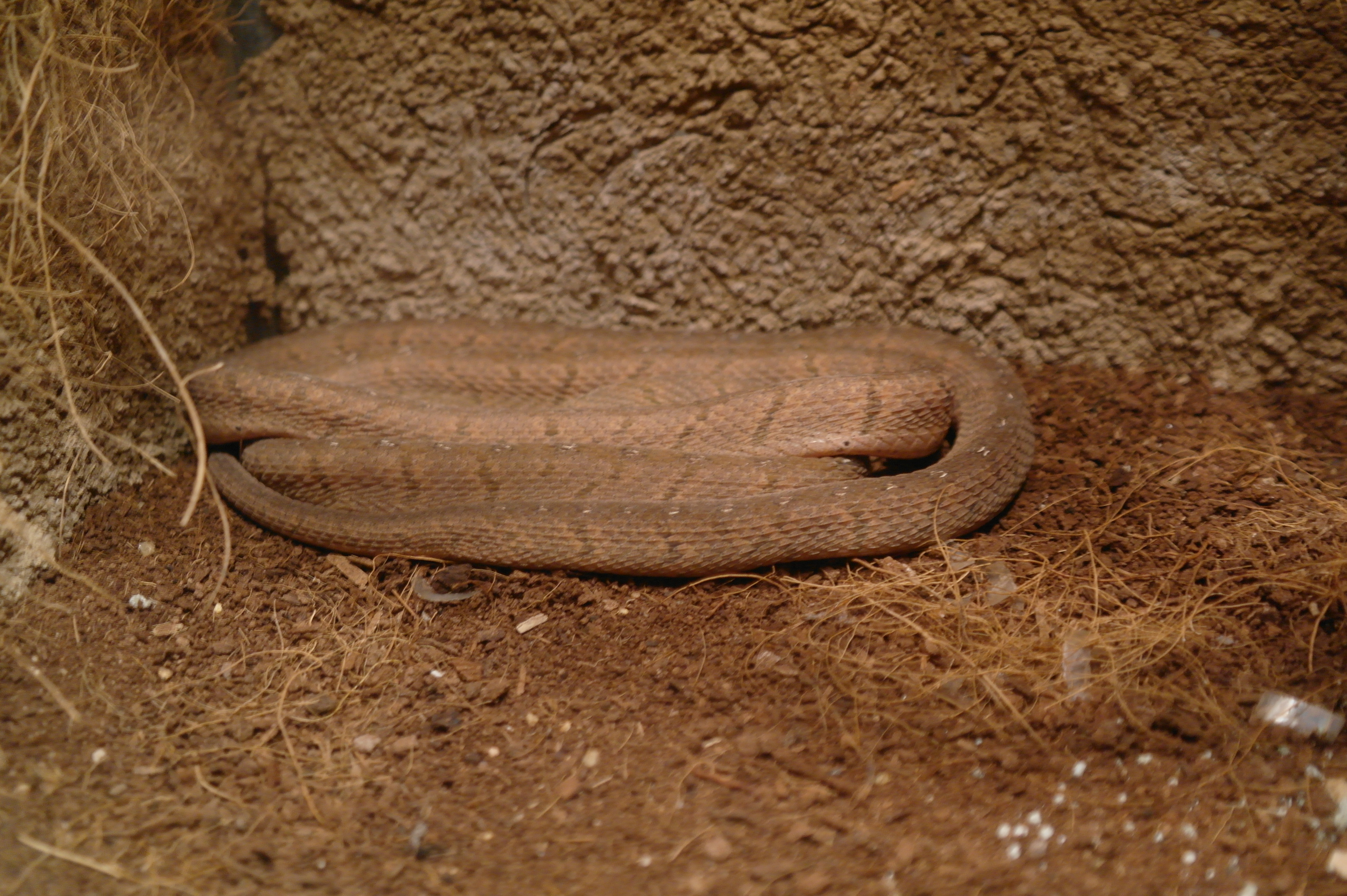
- Dasypeltis medici in the Prague Zoo

Conservation status
- Least Concern (IUCN 3.1)

Scientific classification
- Kingdom: Animalia
- Phylum: Chordata
- Class: Reptilia
- Order: Squamata
- Suborder: Serpentes
- Family: Colubridae
- Genus: Dasypeltis
- Species: D. medici

Binomial name
- Dasypeltis medici (Bianconi, 1859)

Synonyms
- Dipsas medici Bianconi, 1859; Dasypeltis medici — Gans, 1957

= Dasypeltis medici =

Species of snake

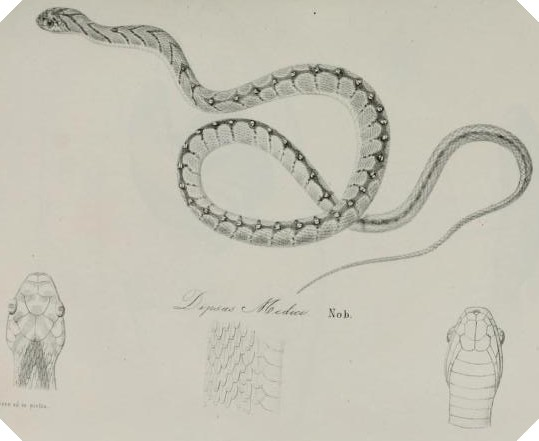
Dasypeltis medici, illustration from Bianconi's original description, 1859

Dasypeltis medici, also known commonly as the East African egg-eater, the eastern forest egg-eater, and the rufous egg eater, is a species of nonvenomous snake in the subfamily Colubrinae of the family Colubridae. The species is endemic to Africa.

== Etymology ==
The specific name, medici, is in honor of Italian physiologist Michele Medici.

== Geographic range ==
Dasypeltis medici is found in Eswatini, Kenya, Malawi, Mozambique, Somalia, South Africa, Tanzania, Zambia, and Zimbabwe.

== Habitat ==
The preferred habitat of Dasypeltis medici is lowland evergreen forest, at elevations from near sea level to 2,500 m (8,200 ft).

== Description ==
Dasypeltis medici may attain a snout-to-vent length (SVL) of 76 cm (30 in) for females, and 60 cm (24 in) for males.

== Diet ==
Dasypeltis medici, like all species in the genus Dasypeltis, feeds exclusively on birds' eggs. It can swallow an egg three times the size of its head. The egg is slit open by vertebral hypapophyses which extend into the esophagus. The collapsed empty shell is regurgitated.

== Reproduction ==
Dasypeltis medici is oviparous. An adult female may lay a clutch of 6–28 elongate eggs, each egg measuring 24 mm × 8 mm (0.94 in × 0.31 in).
