= Medician =

Medician may refer to:

== Medical professionals ==
- biomedical doctor (medical scientist)
- physician
- nurse

== Other ==
- of or pertaining to the Medici family
