= Giacomo Medici =

Giacomo Medici may refer to:

- Giacomo Medici (sculptor) (died 1594)
- Giacomo Medici (general) (1817–1882), Italian patriot and soldier
- Giacomo Medici (art dealer), Italian illicit antiquities dealer
