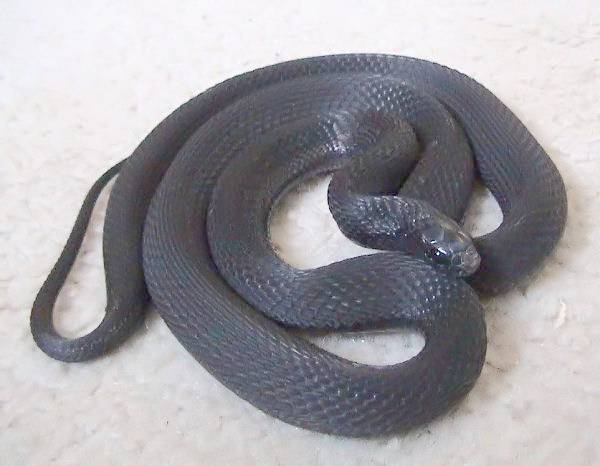
- Montane egg-eating snake (Dasypeltis atra)

Scientific classification
- Kingdom: Animalia
- Phylum: Chordata
- Class: Reptilia
- Order: Squamata
- Suborder: Serpentes
- Family: Colubridae
- Subfamily: Colubrinae
- Genus: Dasypeltis; Wagler, 1830

Species
- 18 recognized species, see article.

= Dasypeltis =

Genus of snakes

Dasypeltis is a genus of snakes, also known commonly as egg-eating snakes or egg-eaters, in the subfamily Colubrinae of the family Colubridae. The genus is one of only two taxonomic groups of snakes known to have adapted to feed exclusively on eggs (the other being the genus Elachistodon). Dasypeltis are non-venomous and found throughout the continent of Africa, primarily in forested or wooded habitats that are also home to numerous species of birds.

== Species and subspecies ==
There are 19 species of Dasypeltis that are recognized as being valid, one of which has recognized subspecies.

- Dasypeltis abyssina (A.M.C. Duméril, Bibron & A.H.A. Duméril, 1854) – Ethiopian egg-eater
- Dasypeltis albigularis Tiutenko, Heller & Bates, 2026 – white-throated egg-eater
- Dasypeltis arabica Broadley & Bates, 2018 – Arabian egg-eater
- Dasypeltis atra Sternfeld, 1912 – African egg-eating snake, montane egg-eater
- Dasypeltis bazi Saleh & Sarhan, 2016 – Egyptian egg-eating snake, Baz's egg-eating snake
- Dasypeltis confusa J. Trape & Mané, 2006 – confusing egg-eater, diamond-back egg-eater
- Dasypeltis congolensis J. Trape, Mediannikov, A. Chirio & L. Chirio, 2021
- Dasypeltis crucifera Bates, 2018 – cross-marked egg-eater
- Dasypeltis fasciata A. Smith, 1849 – Central African egg-eating snake
- Dasypeltis gansi J. Trape & Mané, 2006 – Gans's egg-eater
- Dasypeltis inornata A. Smith, 1849 – southern brown egg-eater
- Dasypeltis latericia J. Trape & Mané, 2006
- Dasypeltis loveridgei Mertens, 1954 – dwarf egg-eater
- Dasypeltis medici (Bianconi, 1859) – East African egg-eater
  - Dasypeltis medici lamuensis Gans, 1957
  - Dasypeltis medici medici (Bianconi, 1859)
- Dasypeltis palmarum (Leach, 1818) – palm egg-eater
- Dasypeltis parascabra S. Trape, Mediannikov & J. Trape, 2012
- Dasypeltis sahelensis J. Trape & Mané, 2006 – Sahel egg-eater
- Dasypeltis scabra (Linnaeus, 1758) – common or rhombic egg-eater
- Dasypeltis taylori Bates & Broadley, 2018

Nota bene: A binomial authority in parentheses indicates that the species was originally described in a genus other than Dasypeltis.

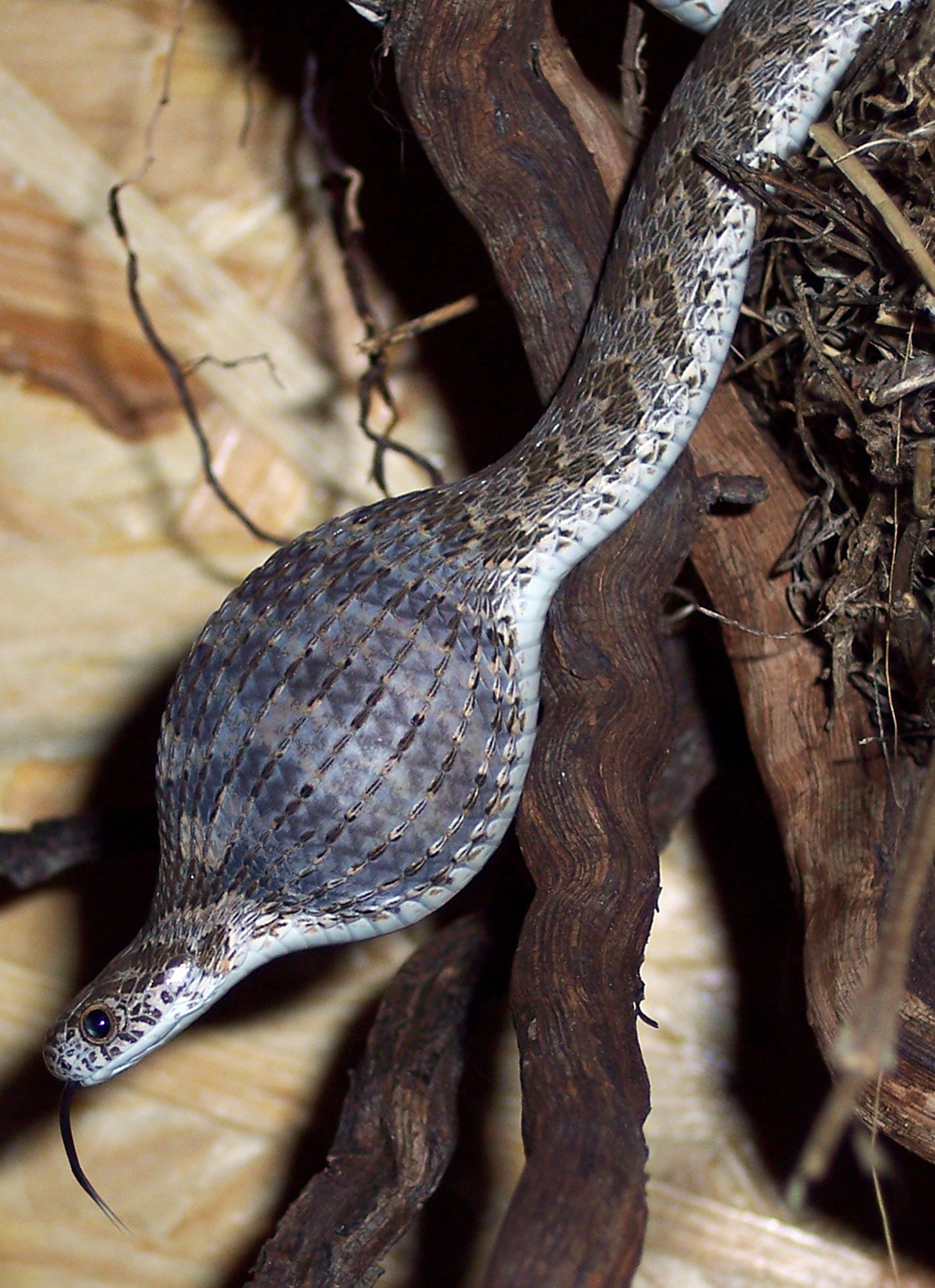
Common egg-eating snake, Dasypeltis scabra, with an egg in its throat

== Description ==
The species of the genus Dasypeltis exhibit a wide variation in patterning and color, from mixtures of browns and greens, to solid black. Individuals in a specific locality tend to share similar color and pattern. They vary in size greatly, from 30–100 cm (12–39.5 in) in total length (including tail).

== Behavior ==
Dasypeltis species tend to have a nervous disposition, and when threatened will perform what is called saw-scaling, a behavior in which the snake will rub the scales on the sides of its body together quickly to make a rasping noise that sounds like hissing. They are agile climbers, and have a keen sense of smell to tell whether an egg is rotten or too far developed to be comfortable to eat. They have extremely flexible jaws and necks for eating eggs much larger than their head. Contrary to popular assumptions, these snakes do have teeth, although they are quite small and they do not puncture the eggs prior to swallowing. Maxillary, palatine, and dentary teeth are present, but there are no pterygoid teeth present. The palatine teeth, however, generally do not penetrate into the oral cavity, being completely covered by mucosa. They do, however, have bony protrusions on the ventral side of their spine which are used to aid in breaking the shells of eggs.

The process of consuming an egg involves wrapping their mouth around it and drawing it into the throat with their jaws, and then flexing their neck muscles to push the egg into the bony protrusions on their spine, which causes the egg to collapse in on itself. Then the snake carefully squeezes the liquid out of the inside of the egg, swallowing the contents, and ends with regurgitation of the completely crushed egg shell. They are remarkably efficient, and waste very little of the contents of an egg.

== Gallery ==
A sequence of a montane egg-eating snake, Dasypeltis atra, consuming a quail egg: grasping egg, swallowing egg, breaking egg and ingesting contents, regurgitating shell.

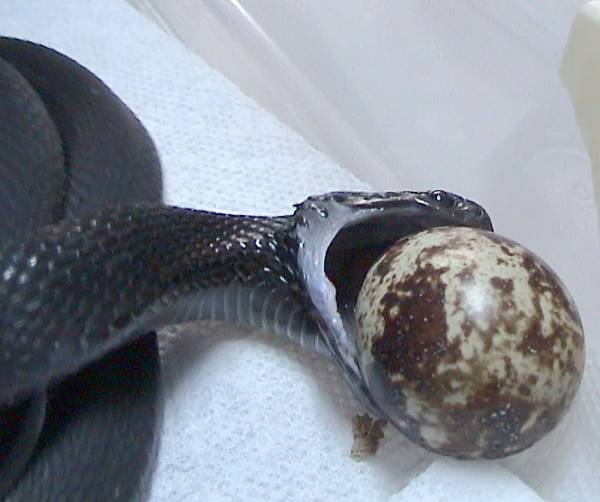

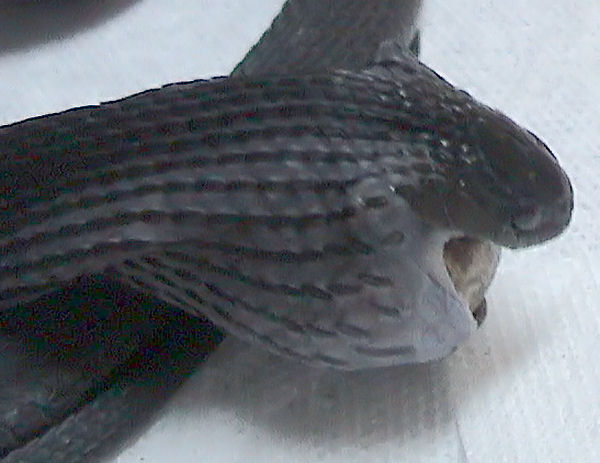

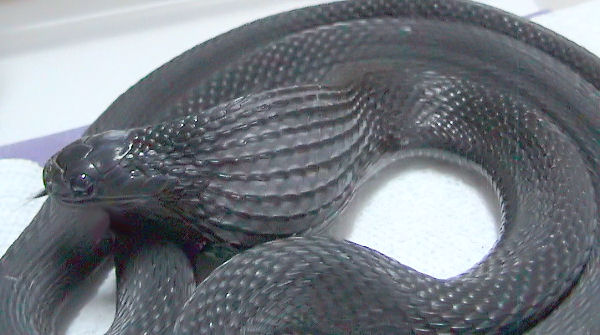

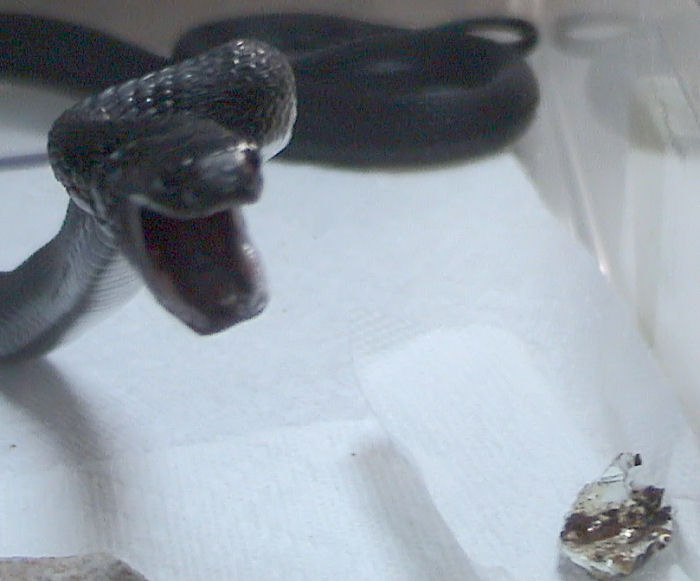

== In captivity ==
Dasypeltis species are readily available in the exotic pet trade, but due to their unique dietary needs they can be a challenge to keep in captivity. Most egg-eating snakes never get large enough to consume typical chicken eggs, so smaller ones must be provided, such as finch or quail eggs. Once a reliable source(s) of food is obtained, Dasypeltis make easy and hardy vivarium species. Captive breeding isn't unheard of, though there's generally low demand, and breeding is typically focused on Dasypeltis gansi and Dasypeltis scabra. Many specimens available are wild caught.

Many owners have resorted to force-feeding their Dasypeltis because the animal seems not to be eating. Like large constrictors, these snakes may go for very long periods (months) without eating after a large meal. As long as the snake is behaving normally and does not appear to be in physical distress, force-feeding is not advised. When a specimen seems to be "off" its food, offering it eggs approximately monthly is appropriate. If the snake does not eat but continues to drink, is active, and sheds, then it does not need to be force-fed.
