= Michele Medici =

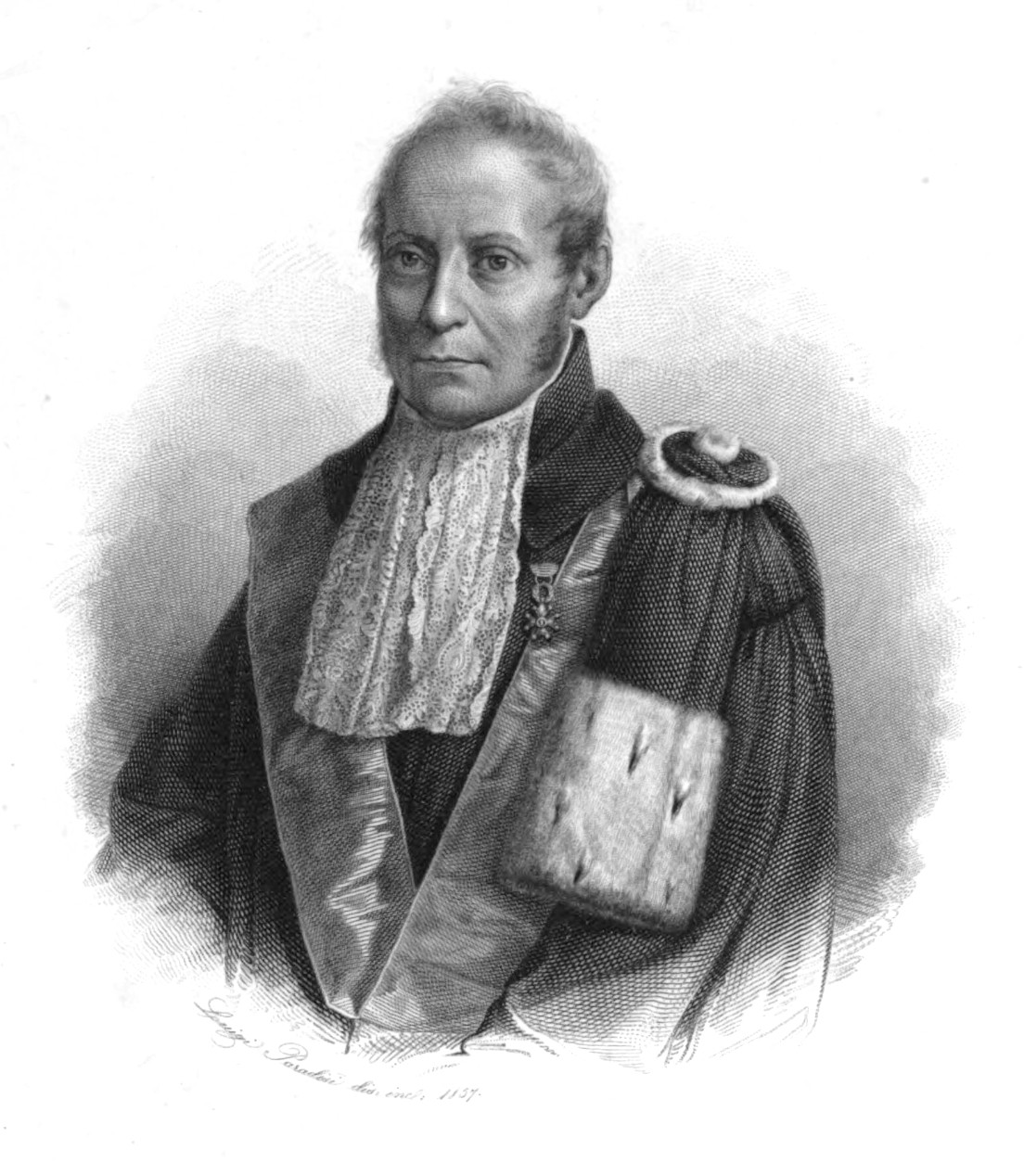

Michele Medici (8 May 1782 – 4 May 1859) was an Italian anatomist, physiologist and an early writer on medical history including that of the Bologna school of medicine. He was the first professor of physiology at the University of Bologna from 1815 to 1846.

Medici was born in Bologna to master silk weaver Girolamo and his wife Antonia Rossi. He studied grammar and rhetoric at a seminary after which he took private lessons in pharmacy practice. In 1802 he received a medical degree from the University of Bologna and worked at the Ospedale Maggiore. In 1805 he became a substitute doctor and in 1818 a primary doctor. In 1815 he was invited to the newly created chair of physiology at the University of Bologna which had been separated from comparative anatomy by the papal government. He guided the development of an experimental approach and a separation from the earlier speculative and philosophical approaches. He noted that the heart activity was dependent on nerves. He supported the ideas of excitability, stimuli and counterstimuli that had been proposed by others in the period He also attempted a physiological classification of diseases. From 1829 he began to examine the biographies of anatomists and the life and writings of surgeons from Bologna. In 1857 he wrote a historical compendium on the anatomical school of Bologna comparing them with the school of Salerno and Padua. Medici presided over the Academy of Sciences of the University of Bologna. In 1833 he published a manual of physiology. In 1846 the chair of physiology went to his former student Marco Paolini.

Apart from medicine, Medici wrote on botanical and entomological topics in the agricultural society. He dissected and wrote on the tymbals of cicadas and the process of sound production. A colleague of his, Giuseppe Bertoloni, named a beetle from Mozambique after him in 1849. It is known today as Purpuricenus medici. In 1859 another colleague, Giovanni Giuseppe Bianconi, named a species of African snake in his honor, Dasypeltis medici.
