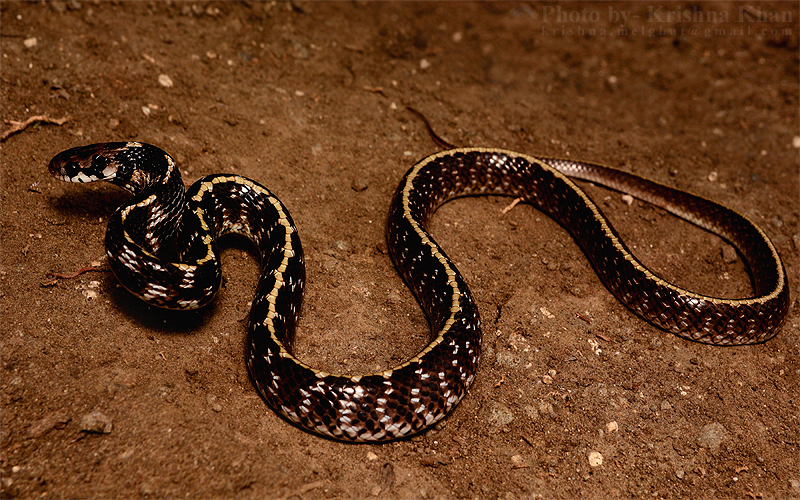
- Indian egg-eater at Amravati

Conservation status
- Least Concern (IUCN 3.1)
- CITES Appendix II

Scientific classification
- Kingdom: Animalia
- Phylum: Chordata
- Class: Reptilia
- Order: Squamata
- Suborder: Serpentes
- Family: Colubridae
- Genus: Boiga; Reinhardt, 1863
- Species: B. westermanni

Binomial name
- Boiga westermanni Reinhardt, 1863
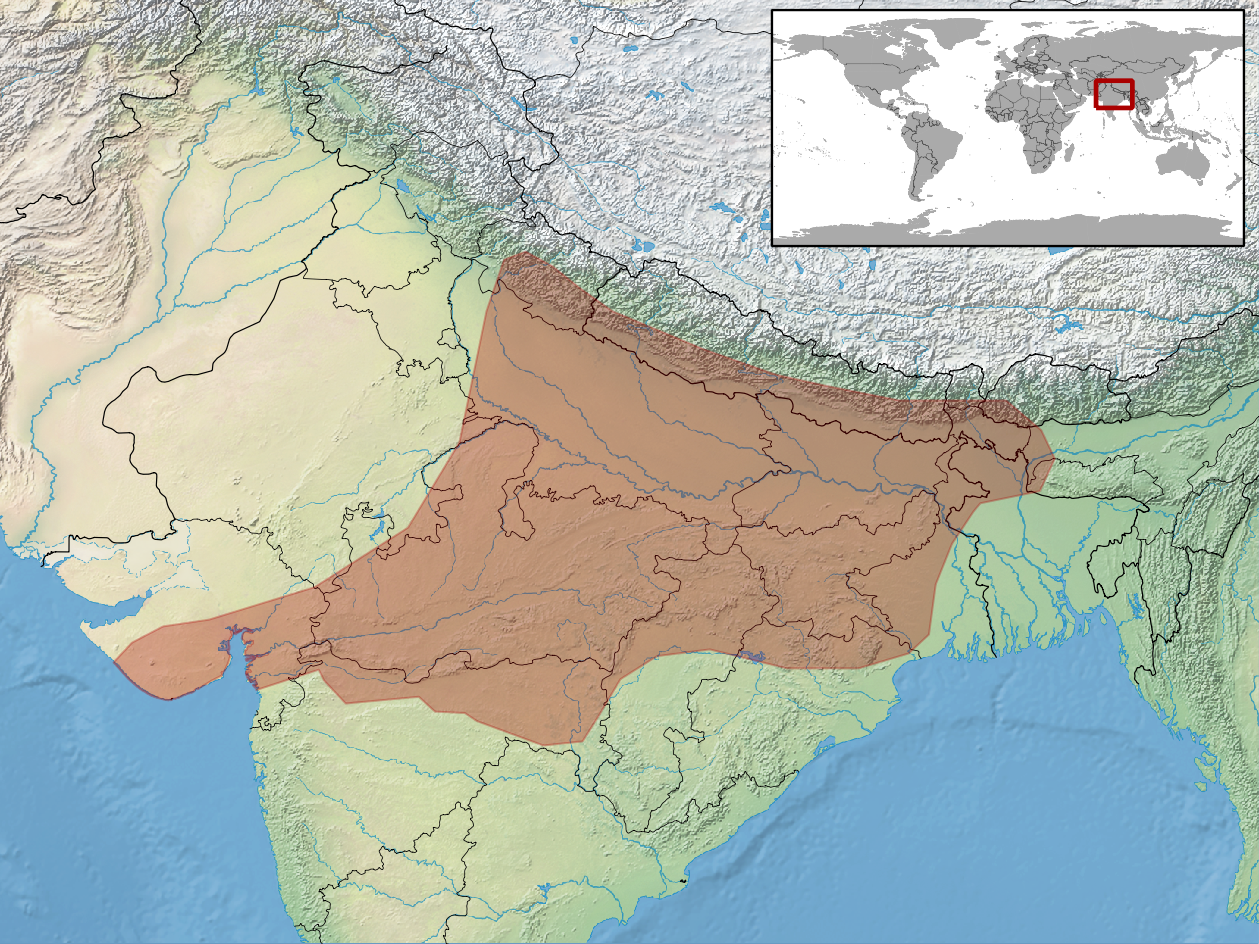

Synonyms
- Elachistodon westermanni Reinhardt, 1863; Boiga westermanni — Mohan et al., 2018; Elachistodon westermanni — Patel & Vyas, 2019

= Indian egg-eating snake =

Species of snake

The Indian egg-eating snake or Indian egg-eater (Boiga westermanni) is a rare species of egg-eating snake in the family Colubridae. The species is endemic to the Indian subcontinent. It is also called Westermann's snake, reflecting its scientific name.

== Etymology ==
The specific name, westermanni, is in honor of Dutch zoologist Geraldus Frederick Westermann (1807–1890).

== Geographic range ==
The Indian egg-eating snake is found in Bangladesh, India, and Nepal. Recent discoveries of the species come from Maharashtra, Gujarat, Punjab, Madhya Pradesh, Telangana and Karnataka.

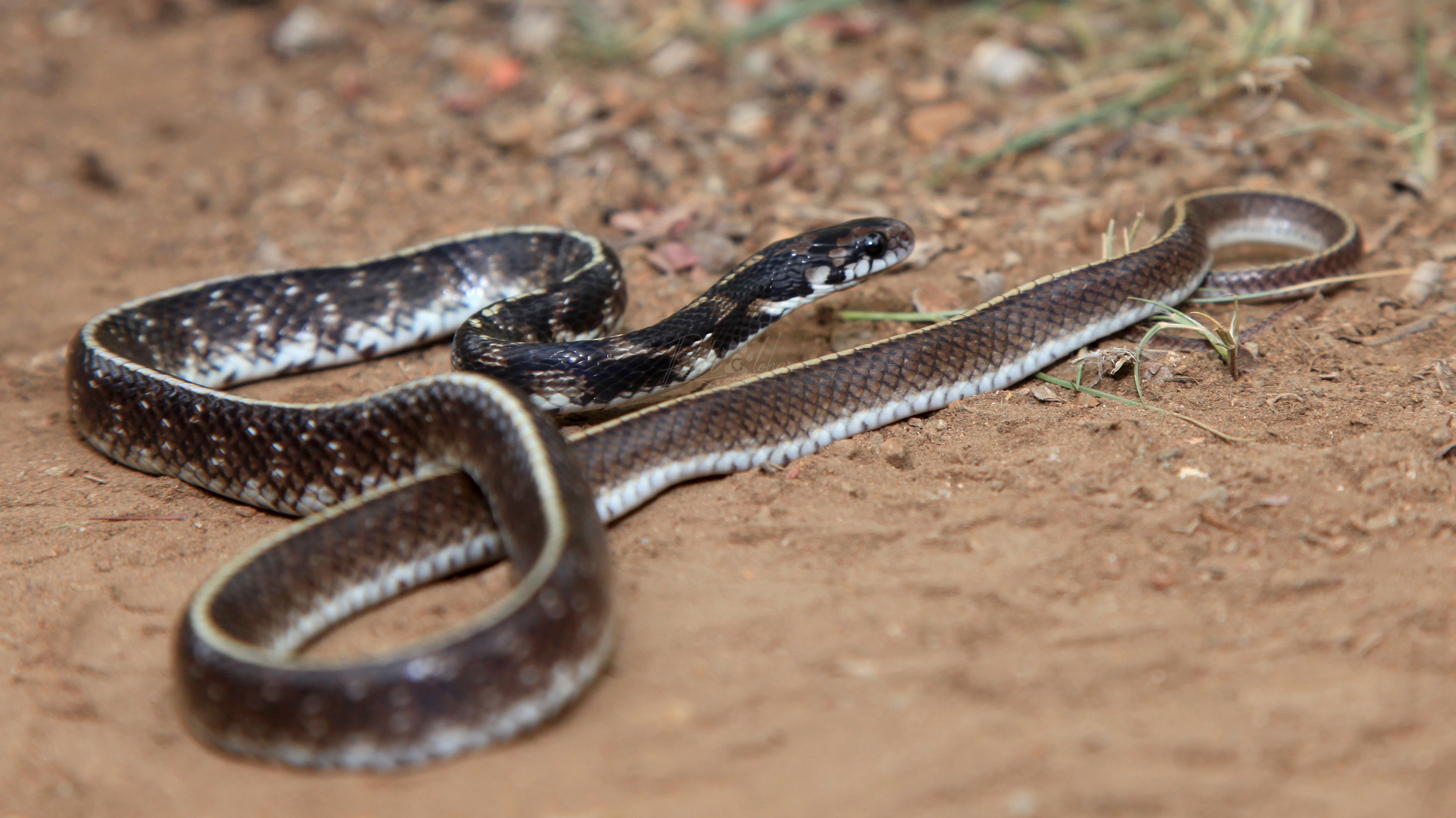

== Habitat ==
The preferred natural habitats of B. westermanni are forest and shrubland, at altitudes of 40–1,000 m (130–3,280 ft).

== Description ==
B. westermanni is glossy brown to black, with bluish white flecks posteriorly and a middorsal creamy stripe from neck to tail tip. The head is brown with a black arrow mark. The ventrals are white with brown dots. Adults may attain a total length of 78 cm (31 inches), with a tail 11 cm (4 1/4 inches) long.

== Behaviour ==
The Indian egg-eating snake is a diurnal or nocturnal, terrestrial species that shows remarkable dexterity in scaling vegetation. When provoked, it raises the anterior portion of the body, forming S-shaped coils as a defensive strategy.

== Diet ==
B. westermanni exclusively feeds on bird eggs that lack embryonic growth. It has special adaptations such as vertebral hypapophyses, projections of the cervical vertebrae, that jut into the oesophagus, are enamel-capped, and help in cracking eggs. The only other snakes that share these egg-eating adaptations are in the genus Dasypeltis found in Africa.

== Reproduction ==
B. westermanni is oviparous.
