= Mariepskop =

Mountain in South Africa

Coordinates: 24°32′50″S 30°52′24″E

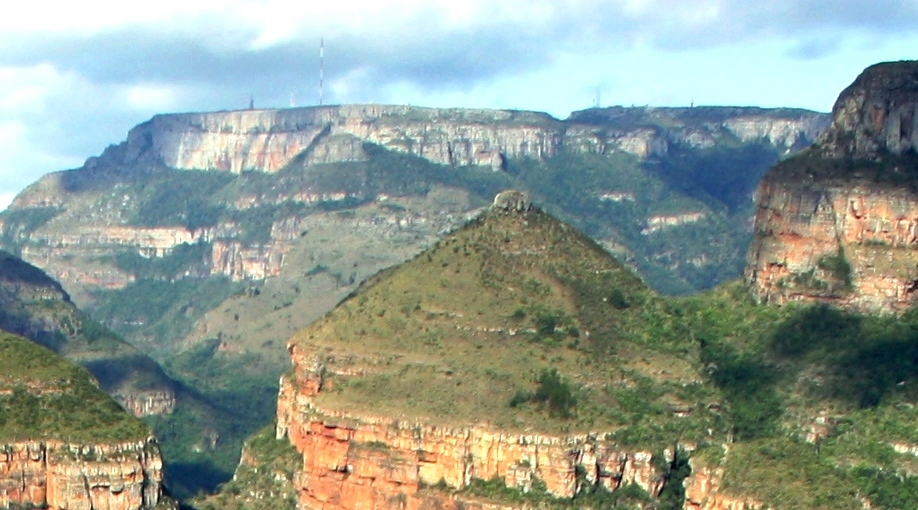
Mariepskop in the background, with the conical Maseroto peak in the foreground. The flat mountaintop afforded refuge to various harried tribes during the Mfecane.

Mariepskop (also Marepe or Maripekop), at 1,947 m above sea level, is one of the highest peaks in the northern Drakensberg, (Note: The peaks of the Wolkberg region are higher, the Ysterkroon reaching 2,126 m, and Serala 2,050 m. The beacon at the northern end of the Rohrbeck Road is 1,943 m above sea level.) and the highest point of the Blyde River Canyon, South Africa. It is situated at the junction of three conservation areas, namely the Mariepskop Forest Reserve, Mariepskop State Forest, and the Blyde River Canyon Nature Reserve. The mountain is bordered by sheer cliff faces on several sides, and is composed of Proterozoic sedimentary rocks of the Transvaal Supergroup. It is named for the 19th century Pulana chief, Maripe Mashile, (Note: Also known as Mariep, Maripi, or Marepe.) whose tribe used the mountain as a stronghold. Some infrastructure and roads were built in the 1950s to service a military radar station. Mariepskop is flanked by Tshwateng (1,628 m) at the opposite side of the Blyde River, and by Hebronberg (1,767 m) in the south.

== Geology ==
The mountain is composed of Proterozoic sedimentary rocks, namely quartzite, shale and dolomite of the Transvaal Supergroup. The plateau consists of resistant Black Reef Quartzite which rests on quartzite and shale of the Wolkberg Group, with a granite-gneiss layer forming the base.

== History ==
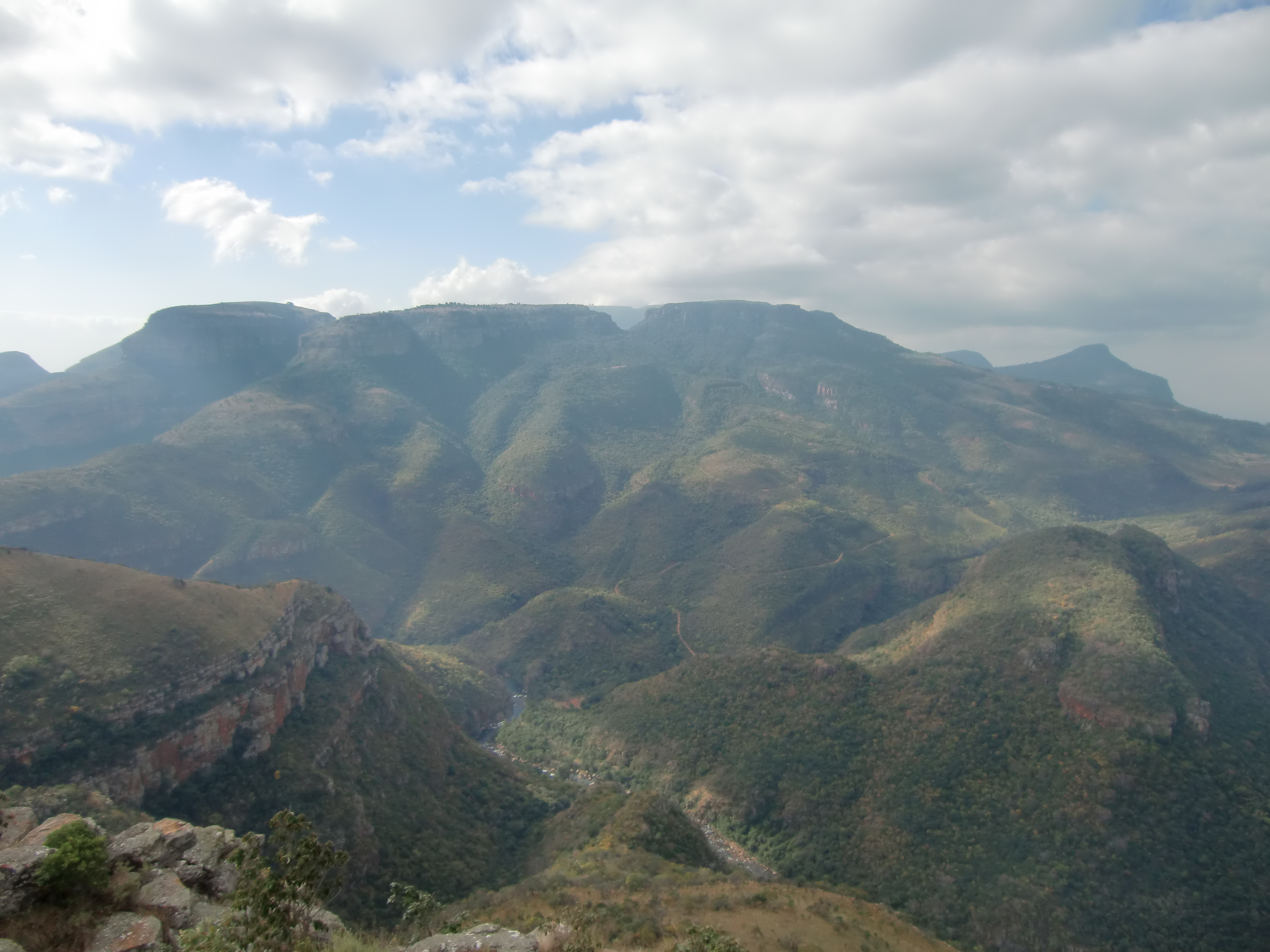
The Mariepskop region seen from a viewpoint to the south

The Mfecane disturbances of the 19th century were responsible for the settlement of the escarpment region by fragments of Sotho-speaking tribes, who once lived on the highveld. Bakwena chief Kowyn settled on the Graskop escarpment, and the Mapulana settled in wretched circumstances in the lowveld. Everywhere south of the Olifants River and North of the Crocodile River, these refugees were harried and looted by the Swazi raiding parties of Mswati II.

Chief Maripe's tribe settled at the base of "the great one", or Thaba ya Moholoholo, as the mountain was then known. (Note: A name still extant for a peak to the north. Also rendered as Mogologolo, or Mohuluhulu.) To evade their common enemy, chief Maripe and Chiloane's Pulana, Pulana of Mokgotho and Mohlala's Pedi people, sought refuge on the mountain plateau. In the Moholoholo war of 1864, boulders were rolled down to ward off the enemy, and numerous attacks on their stronghold were repelled. Skeletons of the Swazi casualties littered the mountain for a long time afterwards.

Quite a number of local place names commemorate this tumultuous period. The nearby Three Rondavel peaks are named for three of the chief's wives, Magabolle, Mogoladikwe and Maseroto, while the adjacent Mapjaneng promontory, once again recalls the chief. Swadeni (also Swadini or Swatini), meaning "the place of the Swazi", seems to be the only place name to commemorate the Swazis, who attacked but never occupied the region for an extended period.

Mariepskop is the resting place of author, adventurer and statesman Deneys Reitz. He had bought a nearby farm along with some land on the hill in 1935 and intended to retire there, but died suddenly in 1944 whilst serving as the South African High Commissioner in Britain. He described it as:

[...] a piece of land more beautiful, in my eyes, than anything in the country. It has a crystal clear mountain torrent of its own, it has flower-carpeted forests and from the rim one looks down a mighty gorge and almost the whole of the Low Country lies stretched beyond.

Reitz's son, Michael, and his wife Leila Reitz, the first woman elected to the South African Parliament, are also commemorated at the site.

== Fauna ==
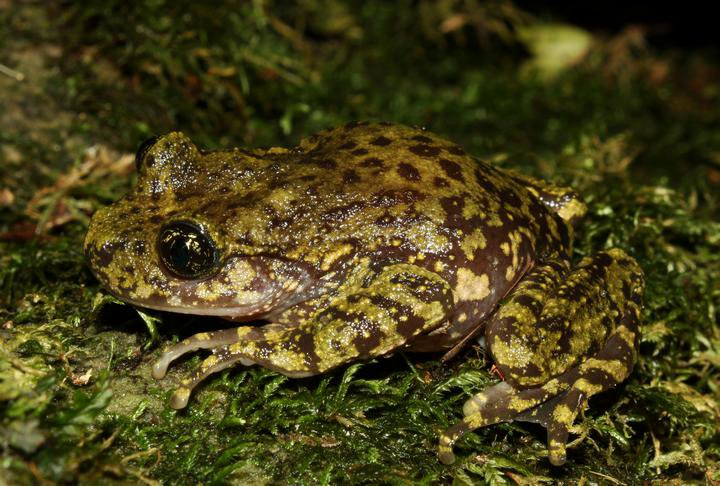
Natal ghost frog at Mariepskop

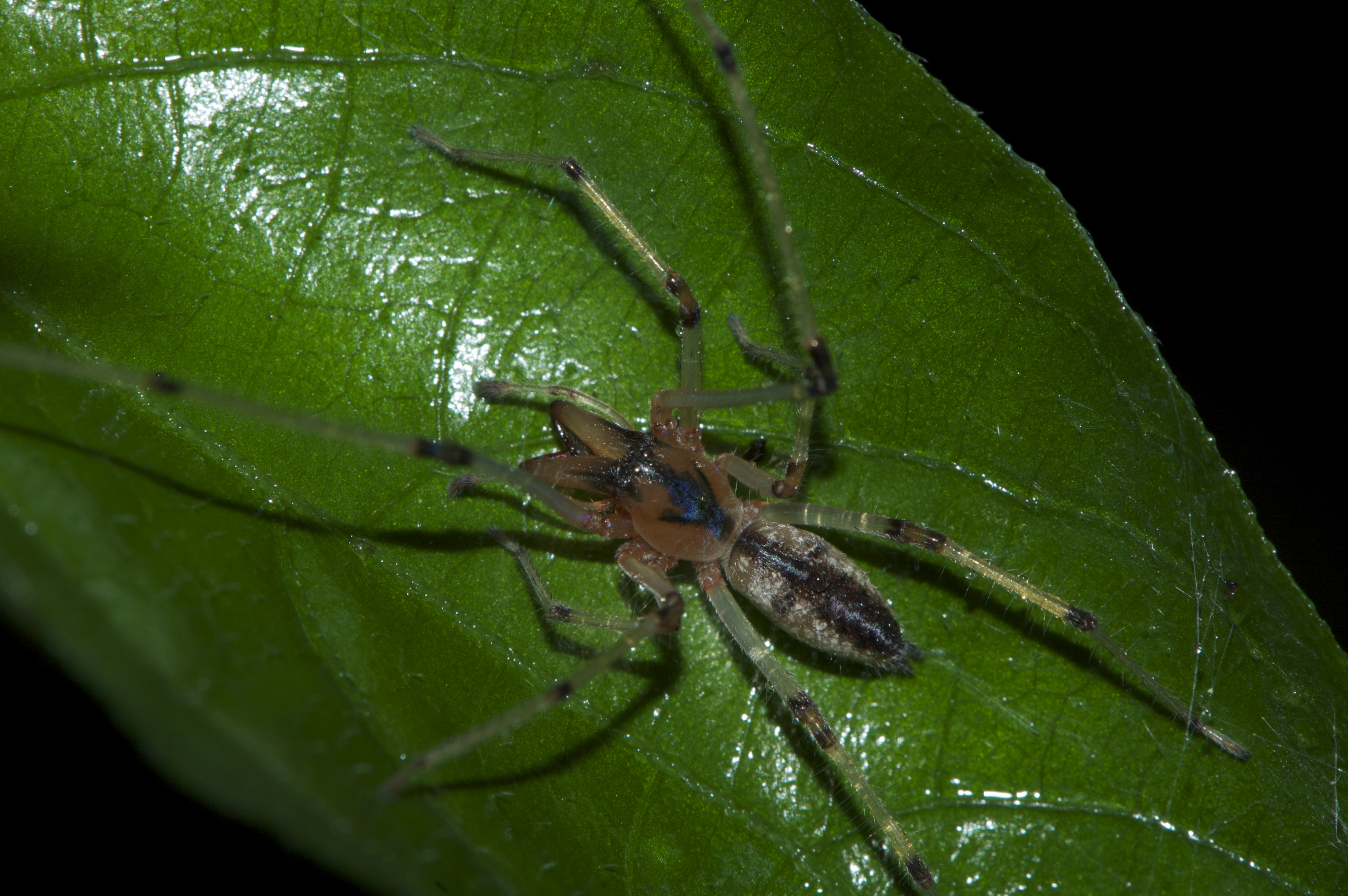
Cheiramiona debeeri in Mariepskop's Afromontane forest. This species of sac spider uses a rolled leaf as refuge.

Small mammals include Brants's climbing mouse, four-striped grass mouse and the arboreal woodland thicket rat. Amphibians include the Gray's stream frog, Angola river frog and Natal ghost frogs. The latter species has a limited and declining range in South Africa and requires clear and cold, swiftly flowing streams, fringed by dense vegetation. The Mariepskop flat gecko was discovered on the mountain in 1982 and described in 2014. The Blyde River and Abel Erasmus flat geckos are related species that occur on isolated massifs very nearby.

== Flora ==
The Mariepskop-Magalieskop complex is separated from the rest of the Drakensberg by the Blyde River and its canyon, and by a tributary of the Klaserie River. These two valleys are seen as floral migration routes between the mountain and lowveld. By 1969 some 1,600 ha of Mariepskop Forest Reserve was allocated to timber plantations, while some 3,000 ha was covered by indigenous forest.

Several distinguishable plant communities have been described. The foothills are covered in low altitude woodlands, which are distinguished as lowveld gallery forest, savanna on mountain slopes, savanna on rocky terrain and submontane forest. In the mountain's higher reaches the high mountain grassland is locally replaced by a type of fynbos vegetation. The higher elevations are home to the mountain plateau, Widdringtonia and montane forest plant communities.

The subpopulation of the Kaapsehoop cycad which once occurred on the rocky slopes of Mariepskop is virtually extinct due to human factors, and the Fusarium fungus that attacks their cones. The mountain is also home to Tulbaghia coddii, range-restricted species, which has lost much of its habitat to the timber industry.

== Radar station ==
Development of the Mariepskop Radar Station commenced during the 1950s. The aim of Project NATSEC (i.e. Project National Security) included the establishment of radar stations near the boundaries of the Transvaal province, which could give an early alert in the event of an aerial attack from adjacent states. A first road to the summit was completed in February 1957, under the stewardship of Warrant Officer 1 W.P.C. Rohrbeck. This access road was improved during late 1961, which facilitated the completion of the radar station, which was operational by 18 November 1965. The radar station was abandoned in 2003 and remains that way.

== Wildlife rehabilitation centre ==
The Moholoholo Wildlife Rehabilitation Centre is situated just outside Kampersrus, in the northern foothills of the mountain. It was established in 1991 when Brian Jones was appointed as its manager.
