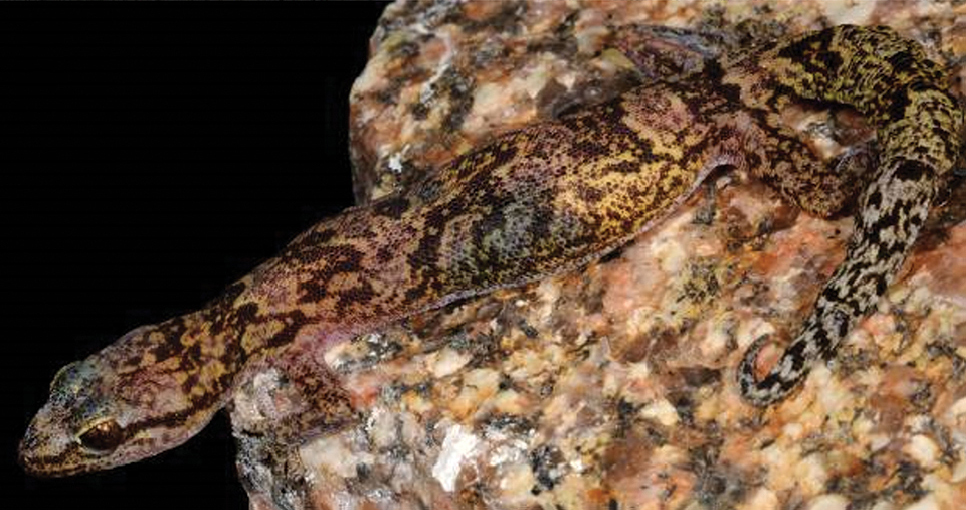

Scientific classification
- Kingdom: Animalia
- Phylum: Chordata
- Class: Reptilia
- Order: Squamata
- Suborder: Gekkota
- Family: Gekkonidae
- Genus: Afroedura
- Species: A. vazpintorum

Binomial name
- Afroedura vazpintorum Branch, Schmitz, Lobón-Rovira, Baptista, António, & Conradie, 2021

= Afroedura vazpintorum =

Species of lizard

Afroedura vazpintorum, also known commonly as the coastal flat gecko, is a species of lizard in the family Gekkonidae. The species is endemic to Angola.
