= Afroedura pundomontana =

Scientific classification
- Kingdom: Animalia
- Phylum: Chordata
- Class: Reptilia
- Order: Squamata
- Suborder: Gekkota
- Family: Gekkonidae
- Genus: Afroedura
- Species: A. pundomontana

Binomial name
- Afroedura pundomontana Conradie, Schmitz, Lobón-Rovira, Becker, Vaz Pinto, & Hauptfleisch, 2022

Species of lizard

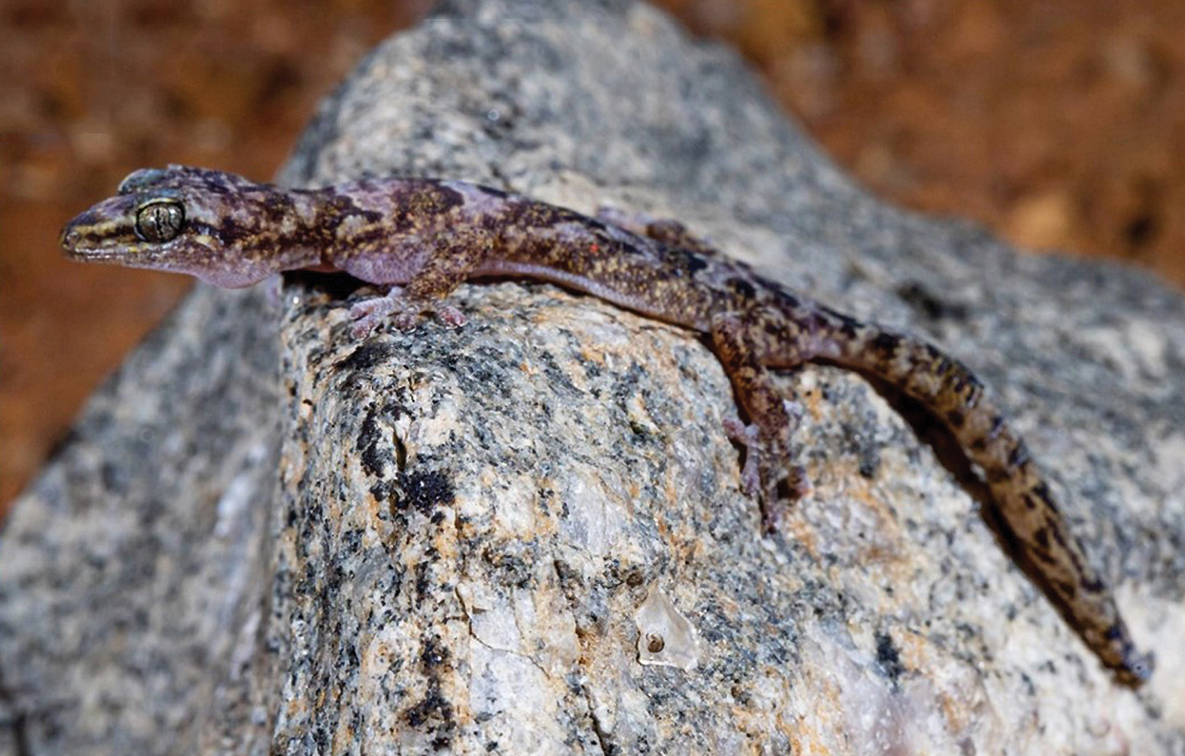
Afroedura pundomontana of Angola

Afroedura pundomontana, also known as the Bocoio flat gecko, is a species of African geckos, first found in Namibia.
