= African rock gecko =

African rock gecko may refer to the two African gecko species below:

- Afroedura africana
- Afroedura tirasensis
