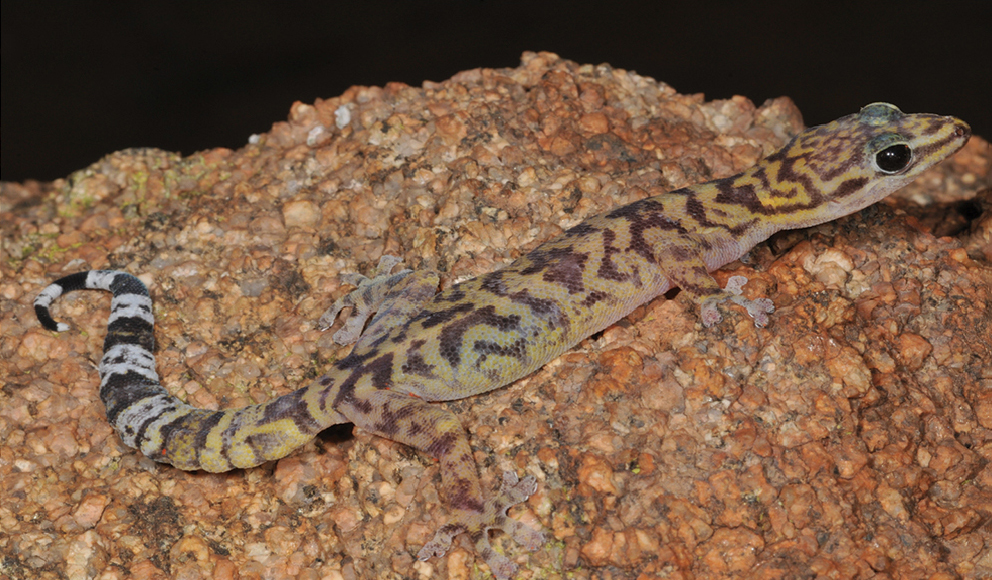

Scientific classification
- Kingdom: Animalia
- Phylum: Chordata
- Class: Reptilia
- Order: Squamata
- Suborder: Gekkota
- Family: Gekkonidae
- Genus: Afroedura
- Species: A. donveae

Binomial name
- Afroedura donveae Branch, Schmitz, Lobón-Rovira, Baptista, António, & Conradie, 2021

= Afroedura donveae =

Species of lizard

Afroedura donveae, is also known commonly as the Iona flat gecko. It is a species of lizard in the family Gekkonidae, endemic to Angola.
