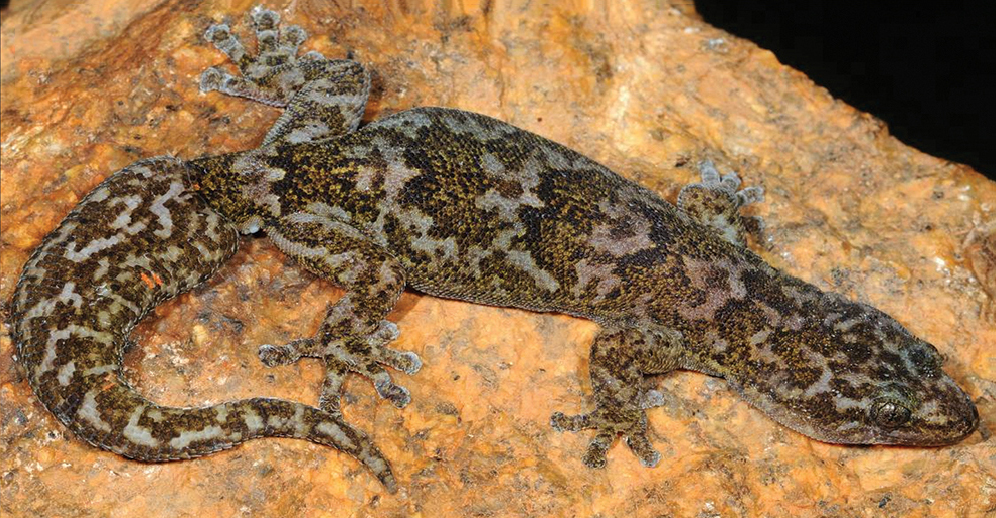

Scientific classification
- Kingdom: Animalia
- Phylum: Chordata
- Class: Reptilia
- Order: Squamata
- Suborder: Gekkota
- Family: Gekkonidae
- Genus: Afroedura
- Species: A. wulfhaackei

Binomial name
- Afroedura wulfhaackei Branch, Schmitz, Lobón-Rovira, Baptista, António, & Conradie, 2021

= Afroedura wulfhaackei =

Species of lizard

Afroedura wulfhaackei, also known commonly as the Angolan flat gecko, is a species of lizard in the family Gekkonidae. The species is endemic to Angola.
