= Inland rock gecko =

inland rock gecko may refer to the two African gecko species below:

- Afroedura karroica
- Afroedura halli
