= Cicynethus acer =

Northern Cicynethus Zodariid spider

Conservation status
- Least Concern (SANBI Red List)

Scientific classification
- Kingdom: Animalia
- Phylum: Arthropoda
- Subphylum: Chelicerata
- Class: Arachnida
- Order: Araneae
- Infraorder: Araneomorphae
- Family: Zodariidae
- Genus: Cicynethus
- Species: C. acer

Binomial name
- Cicynethus acer Jocqué & Henrard, 2018

Species of spider

Cicynethus acer is a species of spider in the family Zodariidae. It is found in southern Africa and is commonly known as the Northern Cicynethus Zodariid spider.

== Distribution ==
Cicynethus acer occurs in Mozambique and South Africa. In South Africa, it has been recorded from Limpopo and Mpumalanga provinces, including localities at Pietersburg/Polokwane and Mariepskop.

== Habitat ==
The species inhabits areas at altitudes ranging from 1279 to 1328 m above sea level. It has been collected from forest areas and leaf litter in the Savanna biome.

== Description ==
Cicynethus acer has a total length of 10.30 mm. The carapace is medium reddish-brown and darker on the sides, while the chelicerae are medium brown. The sternum is medium brown, and the endites and labium are pale yellow with darker margins along the edges. The legs are pale yellow with brown coloration on the sides.

The opisthosoma has a distinctive pattern on the dorsum, featuring dark grey mottling with two median triangles and a white median stripe in front of the spinnerets. The sides show dark grey mottling, while the venter is pale with poorly defined dark stripes in the posterior half.

== Ecology ==
Cicynethus acer has a mixed lifestyle, spending part of its life cycle at ground level in humus and part in the shrub layer. Specimens have been collected by beating shrubs in forest areas and sifting leaf litter.

== Conservation ==
The species is listed as Least Concern by the South African National Biodiversity Institute due to its wide distribution in southern Africa. No significant threats to the species have been identified.
