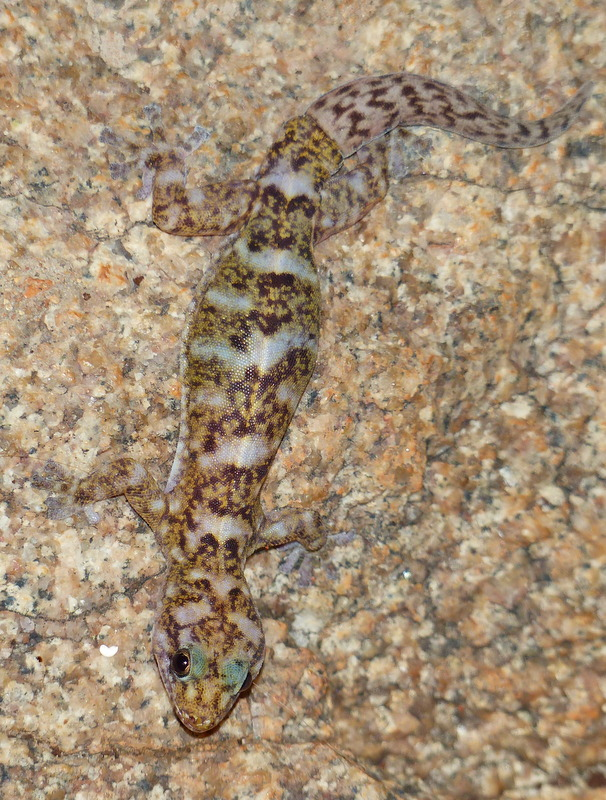
- Transvaal flat gecko (A. transvaalica)

Scientific classification
- Kingdom: Animalia
- Phylum: Chordata
- Class: Reptilia
- Order: Squamata
- Suborder: Gekkota
- Family: Gekkonidae
- Subfamily: Uroplatinae
- Genus: Afroedura; Loveridge, 1944

Species
- 34, see text.

= Afroedura =

Genus of lizards

Afroedura is a genus of African geckos, lizards in the family Gekkonidae. Member species are collectively known as rock geckos or flat geckos.

In 2021, four new species of Afroedura were described from Angola.

== Species ==
The genus Afroedura contains 34 species that are recognized as being valid.

- Afroedura africana (Boulenger, 1888)
- Afroedura amatolica (Hewitt, 1925) – Amatola rock gecko
- Afroedura bogerti Loveridge, 1944 – Bogert's rock gecko
- Afroedura broadleyi Jacobsen, Kuhn, Jackman & Bauer, 2014 – Broadley's rock gecko
- Afroedura donveae Branch, Schmitz, Lobón-Rovira, Baptista, António & Conradie, 2021 – Iona flat gecko
- Afroedura gorongosa Branch, Guyton, Schmitz, Barej, Naskrecki, Farooq, Verburgt & Rödel, 2017
- Afroedura granitica Jacobsen, Kuhn, Jackman & Bauer, 2014 – granite rock gecko
- Afroedura haackei (Onderstall, 1984) – Haacke's rock gecko
- Afroedura halli (Hewitt, 1935)
- Afroedura hawequensis Mouton & Mostert, 1985 – Cape rock gecko, Hawequa flat gecko
- Afroedura karroica (Hewitt, 1925)
- Afroedura langi (V. Fitzsimons, 1930)
- Afroedura leoloensis Jacobsen, Kuhn, Jackman & Bauer, 2014 – Leolo rock gecko
- Afroedura loveridgei Broadley, 1963 – Loveridge's rock gecko
- Afroedura major Onderstall, 1984
- Afroedura maripi Jacobsen, Kuhn, Jackman & Bauer, 2014 – Maripi rock gecko
- Afroedura marleyi (V. FitzSimons, 1930) – Marley's rock gecko, Marley's flat gecko
- Afroedura multiporis (Hewitt, 1925) – Multipored rock gecko, Woodbush flat gecko
- Afroedura namaquensis (V. FitzSimons, 1938) – Namaqua rock gecko, Namaqua flat gecko
- Afroedura nivaria (Boulenger, 1894) – Drakensberg rock gecko, Drakensberg flat gecko
- Afroedura otjihipa Conradie, Schmitz, Lobón-Rovira, Becker, Vaz Pinto & Hauptfleisch, 2022 – Otjihipa flat gecko
- Afroedura pienaari Jacobsen, Kuhn, Jackman & Bauer, 2014 – Pienaar's rock gecko
- Afroedura pondolia (Hewitt, 1925) – Pondo rock gecko, Pondo flat gecko
- Afroedura pongola Jacobsen, Kuhn, Jackman & Bauer, 2014 – Pongola rock gecko
- Afroedura praedicta Branch, Schmitz, Lobón-Rovira, Becker, António & Conradie, 2021 – Serra da Neve flat gecko
- Afroedura pundomontana Conradie, Schmitz, Lobón-Rovira, Becker, Vaz Pinto & Hauptfleisch, 2022 – Bocoio flat gecko
- Afroedura rondavelica Jacobsen, Kuhn, Jackman & Bauer, 2014 – Rondavels rock gecko
- Afroedura rupestris Jacobsen, Kuhn, Jackman & Bauer, 2014
- Afroedura tembulica (Hewitt, 1926) – Queenstown rock gecko, Tembu flat gecko
- Afroedura tirasensis Haacke, 1965
- Afroedura transvaalica (Hewitt, 1925) – Transvaal rock gecko, Transvaal flat gecko
- Afroedura vazpintorum Branch, Schmitz, Lobón-Rovira, Baptista, António & Conradie, 2021 – Coastal flat gecko
- Afroedura waterbergensis Jacobsen, Kuhn, Jackman & Bauer, 2014 – Waterberg rock gecko
- Afroedura wulfhaackei Branch, Schmitz, Lobón-Rovira, Baptista, António & Conradie, 2021 – Angolan flat gecko

Nota bene: A binomial authority in parentheses indicates that the species was originally described in a genus other than Afroedura.
