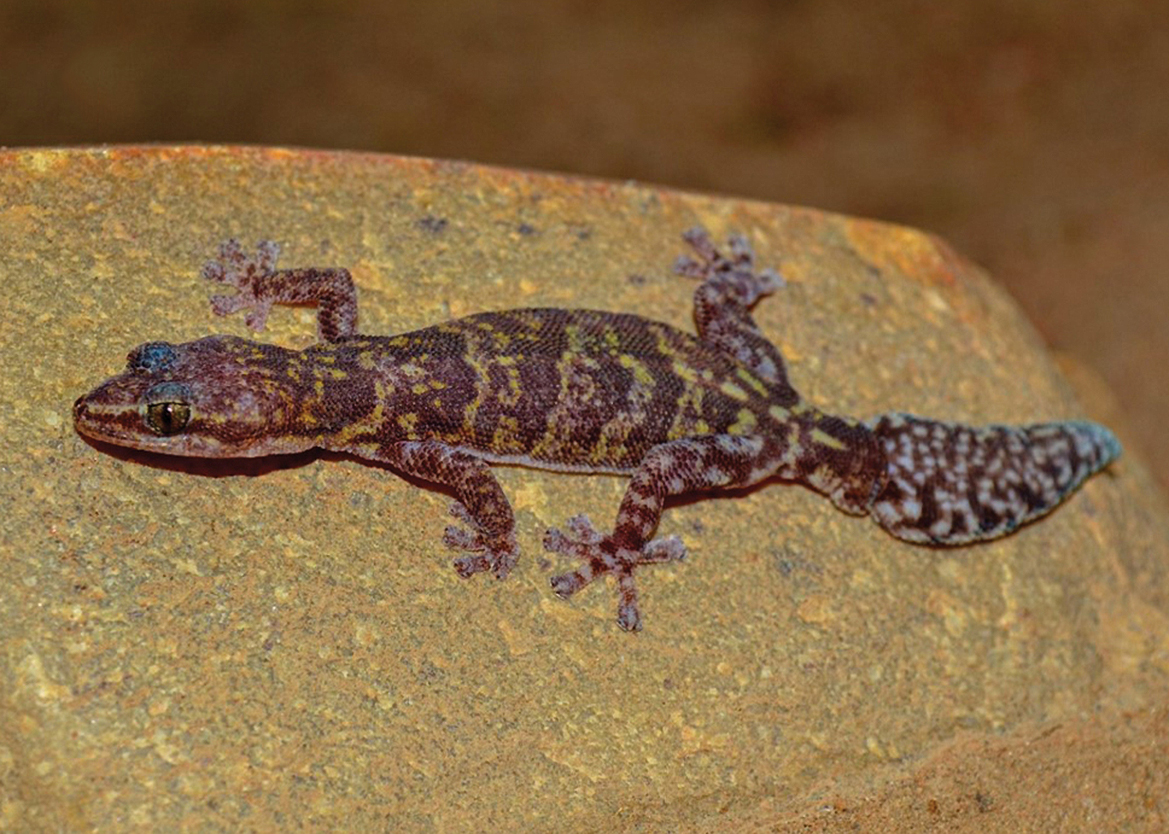

Scientific classification
- Kingdom: Animalia
- Phylum: Chordata
- Class: Reptilia
- Order: Squamata
- Suborder: Gekkota
- Family: Gekkonidae
- Genus: Afroedura
- Species: A. otjihipa

Binomial name
- Afroedura otjihipa Conradie, Schmitz, Lobón-Rovira, Becker, Vaz Pinto, & Hauptfleisch, 2022

= Afroedura otjihipa =

Species of lizard

Afroedura otjihipa, also known as Otjihipa flat gecko, is a species of African geckos, first found in Namibia.
