= Cyrtodactylus pageli =

Conservation status
- Least Concern (IUCN 3.1)

Scientific classification
- Kingdom: Animalia
- Phylum: Chordata
- Class: Reptilia
- Order: Squamata
- Suborder: Gekkota
- Family: Gekkonidae
- Genus: Cyrtodactylus
- Species: C. pageli

Binomial name
- Cyrtodactylus pageli Schneider, T.Q. Nguyen, Schmitz, Kingsada, Auer & Ziegler, 2011

Species of lizard

Cyrtodactylus pageli is a species of gecko, a lizard in the family Gekkonidae. The species is endemic to Laos.

== Etymology ==
The specific name, pageli, is in honor of German zoologist Theodor Bernhard Pagel.

== Geographic range ==
C. pageli is found in northwestern Laos, in Vientiane Province.

== Habitat ==
The preferred natural habitats of C. pageli are forest and dry caves, at altitudes of 260–300 m (850–980 ft).

== Description ==
Medium-sized for its genus, C. pageli may attain a snout-to-vent length (SVL) of 8 cm (3.1 in).

== Reproduction ==
The mode of reproduction of C. pageli is unknown.
