= Haacke =

Haacke is a German surname, a variation of Haack. It is derived from the Old German word haak, meaning "hook" or "crook".

Notable people with the surname include:

- Hans Haacke (born 1936), German artist
- Julia Haacke (born 1971), German actress
- Julian von Haacke (born 1994), German footballer
- Wilhelm Haacke (1855–1912), German zoologist

== See also ==
- Haacke HFM-2, a German two cylinder flat engine built in the early 1920s
- Haacke's rock gecko, or Haacke's flat gecko (Afroedura haackei), is a species of African gecko found in South Africa
