= Afroedura gorongosa =

Scientific classification
- Kingdom: Animalia
- Phylum: Chordata
- Class: Reptilia
- Order: Squamata
- Suborder: Gekkota
- Family: Gekkonidae
- Genus: Afroedura
- Species: A. gorongosa

Binomial name
- Afroedura gorongosa Branch, Guyton, Schmitz, Barej, Naskrecki, Farooq, Verburgt, & Rödel, 2017

Species of African gecko

Afroedura gorongosa is a species of African gecko found in Mozambique.
