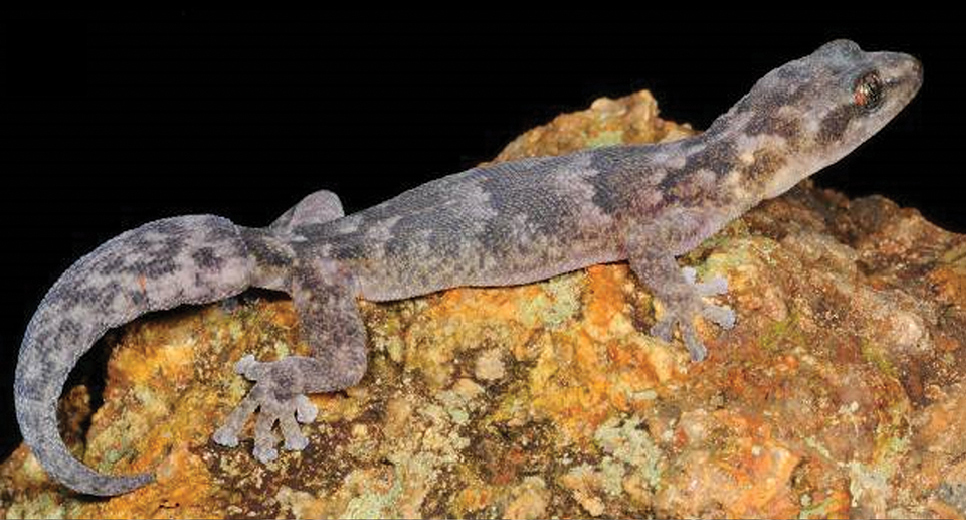

Conservation status
- Least Concern (IUCN 3.1)

Scientific classification
- Kingdom: Animalia
- Phylum: Chordata
- Class: Reptilia
- Order: Squamata
- Suborder: Gekkota
- Family: Gekkonidae
- Genus: Afroedura
- Species: A. bogerti

Binomial name
- Afroedura bogerti Loveridge, 1944
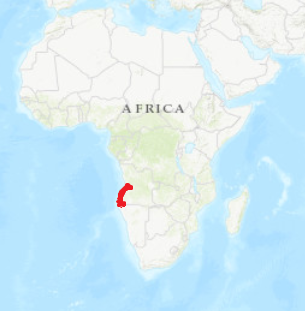

Synonyms
- Afroedura karroica bogerti Loveridge, 1944; Afroedura bogerti — Onderstall, 1984

= Bogert's rock gecko =

Species of lizard

Bogert's rock gecko (Afroedura bogerti) is a species of lizard in the family Gekkonidae. The species is native to southern Africa.

== Etymology ==
The specific name, bogerti, is in honor of American herpetologist Charles Mitchill Bogert.

== Geographic range ==
A. bogerti is found in Angola and Namibia.

== Habitat ==
The preferred natural habitat of A. bogerti is rocky areas in savanna, at altitudes of 50–2,000 m (160–6,560 ft).

== Description ==
Adults of A. bogerti have a snout-to-vent length (SVL) of about 5 cm (2.0 in). Dorsally, the body is gray, with darker irregularly shaped crossbars. Ventrally it is white, speckled with brown.

== Reproduction ==
A. bogerti is oviparous.
