= Loveridge's rock gecko =

Conservation status
- Least Concern (IUCN 3.1)

Scientific classification
- Kingdom: Animalia
- Phylum: Chordata
- Class: Reptilia
- Order: Squamata
- Suborder: Gekkota
- Family: Gekkonidae
- Genus: Afroedura
- Species: A. loveridgei

Binomial name
- Afroedura loveridgei Broadley, 1963

Synonyms
- Afroedura transvaalica loveridgei Broadley, 1963; Afroedura loveridgei — Bauer, Good & Branch, 1997

Species of lizard

Loveridge's rock gecko (Afroedura loveridgei) is a species of gecko, a lizard in the family Gekkonidae. The species is endemic to Mozambique in southeastern Africa.

== Etymology ==
The specific name, loveridgei, is in honor of herpetologist Arthur Loveridge.

== Geographic range ==
Afroedura loveridgei is found in central Mozambique.

== Description ==
The snout-to-vent length (SVL) of adults of Afroedura loveridgei is usually 4–5 cm (1.6–2.0 in).

== Habitat ==
The preferred natural habitat of Afroedura loveridgei is rock outcrops in arid savanna.

== Diet ==
The diet of Afroedura loveridgei consists of beetles, grasshoppers, and other insects.

== Reproduction ==
Afroedura loveridgei is oviparous. Eggs are laid in communal sites under flakes of rock. Each adult female lays a clutch of two eggs.
