= Afroedura major =

Conservation status
- Least Concern (IUCN 3.1)

Scientific classification
- Kingdom: Animalia
- Phylum: Chordata
- Class: Reptilia
- Order: Squamata
- Suborder: Gekkota
- Family: Gekkonidae
- Genus: Afroedura
- Species: A. major

Binomial name
- Afroedura major Oderstall, 1984

Synonyms
- Afroedura pondolia major

Species of lizard

Afroedura major, also known as the major rock gecko, Swazi flat gecko, or giant Swazi flat gecko, is a species of African gecko endemic to Eswatini (formerly Swaziland).
