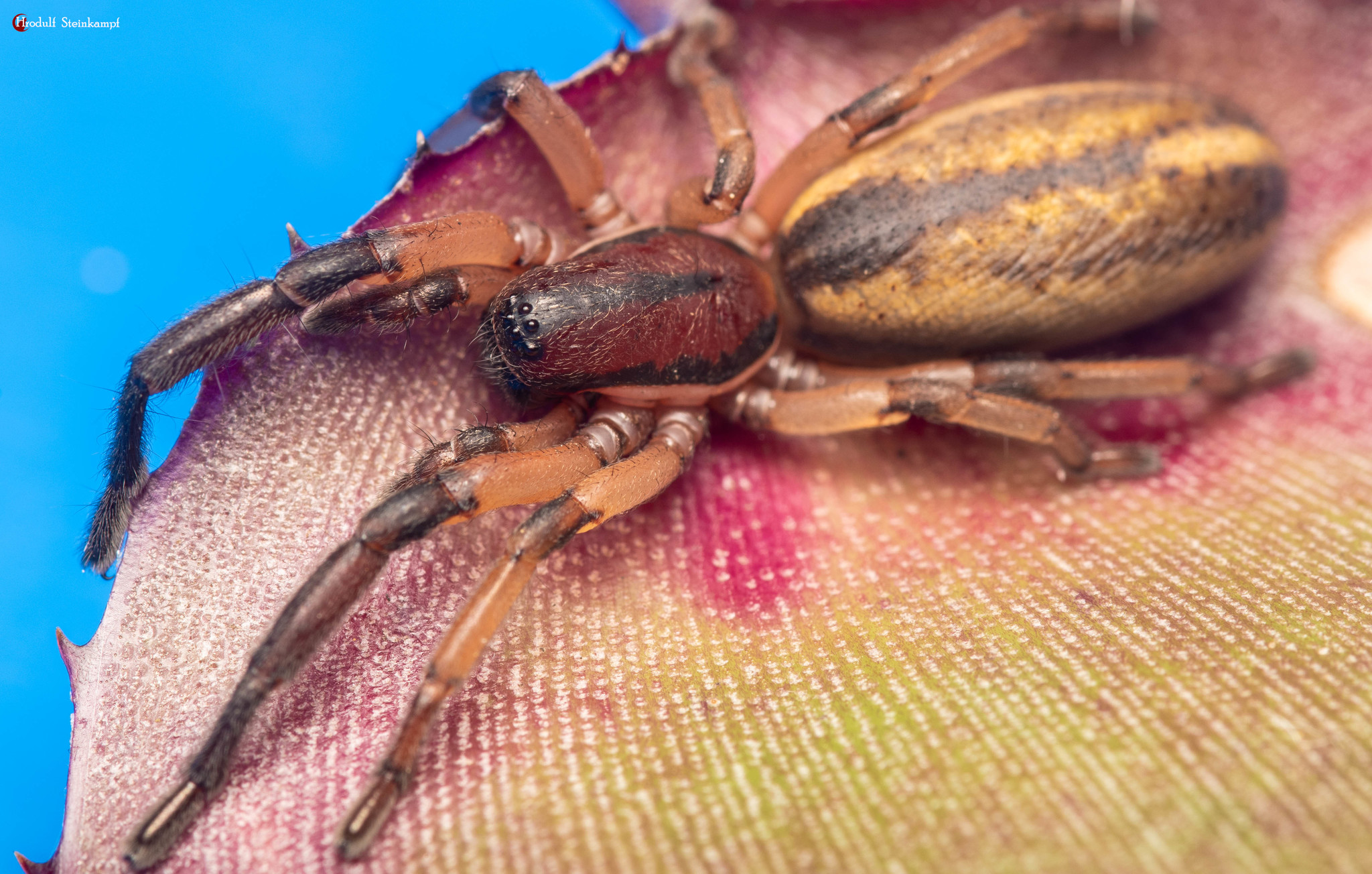
- female

Scientific classification
- Kingdom: Animalia
- Phylum: Arthropoda
- Subphylum: Chelicerata
- Class: Arachnida
- Order: Araneae
- Infraorder: Araneomorphae
- Family: Zodariidae
- Genus: Cicynethus
- Species: C. subtropicalis

Binomial name
- Cicynethus subtropicalis (Lawrence, 1952)

Synonyms
- Chariobas subtropicalis Lawrence, 1952

= Cicynethus subtropicalis =

Subtropical Cicynethus Zodariid spider

Species of spider

Cicynethus subtropicalis is a species of spider in the family Zodariidae. It is endemic to South Africa and is commonly known as the Subtropical Cicynethus Zodariid spider.

== Distribution ==
Cicynethus subtropicalis is found in KwaZulu-Natal and Limpopo provinces. Notable localities include iSimangaliso Wetland Park (including Kosi Bay Nature Reserve and uMkhuze Game Reserve), Ndumo Game Reserve, Tembe Elephant Park, and areas near Empangeni and Richards Bay.

== Habitat ==
The species occurs at altitudes ranging from 51 to 140 m above sea level in the Savanna biome. It has been collected from under tree bark, by sweeping grass and bushes, and in pitfall traps. The species sometimes constructs retreats at the top of small, broad-leaved shrubs in deciduous woodlands, where it spins several leaves together with silk.

== Description ==
Both males and females of Cicynethus subtropicalis are recognized by their distinctive color patterns on the legs and opisthosoma. The carapace and mandibles are reddish-brown, while the legs are yellow tinged with orange, with the anterior pair being more reddish. The coxae and sternum are yellow, with the sternum being reddish anteriorly.

The opisthosoma is light yellow-brown above with a distinctive dark lanceolate median marking that narrows posteriorly but does not reach the spinnerets. The ventral surface is olivaceous without markings.

== Ecology ==
Cicynethus subtropicalis exhibits interesting architectural behavior, constructing silk retreats by binding leaves together at the tops of shrubs in deciduous woodland habitats.

== Conservation ==
The species is listed as Least Concern by the South African National Biodiversity Institute. All six known collections are from protected areas, and the species is not suspected to be declining. It is protected in multiple reserves including Kosi Bay Nature Reserve, uMkhuze Game Reserve, Ndumo Game Reserve, Tembe Elephant Park, and Nambiti Game Reserve.
