= Amatola rock gecko =

Conservation status
- Least Concern (IUCN 3.1)

Scientific classification
- Kingdom: Animalia
- Phylum: Chordata
- Class: Reptilia
- Order: Squamata
- Suborder: Gekkota
- Family: Gekkonidae
- Genus: Afroedura
- Species: A. amatolica

Binomial name
- Afroedura amatolica (Hewitt, 1925)

Synonyms
- Oedura amatolica

Species of lizard

The Amatola rock gecko or Amatola flat gecko (Afroedura amatolica) is a species of African gecko endemic to South Africa.
