= Anolis loveridgei =

Conservation status
- Endangered (IUCN 3.1)

Scientific classification
- Kingdom: Animalia
- Phylum: Chordata
- Class: Reptilia
- Order: Squamata
- Suborder: Iguania
- Family: Dactyloidae
- Genus: Anolis
- Species: A. loveridgei

Binomial name
- Anolis loveridgei Schmidt, 1936

Synonyms
- Norops loveridgei (Schmidt, 1936)

Species of lizard

Anolis loveridgei, also known commonly as the Honduran giant anole and Loveridge's anole, is a species of lizard in the family Dactyloidae. The species is endemic to Honduras.

== Etymology ==
The specific name, loveridgei, is in honor of herpetologist Arthur Loveridge.

== Description ==
Anolis loveridgei may attain a snout-to-vent length (SVL) of almost 12 cm (4.7 in). The large dewlap of the male is orange with magenta streaks.

== Habitat ==
The preferred natural habitat of Anolis loveridgei is rocky areas of forest.

== Reproduction ==
Anolis loveridgei is oviparous.

== Taxonomy ==
Anolis loveridgei is a member of the Anolis auratus species group.
