= Drakensberg rock gecko =

Conservation status
- Least Concern (IUCN 3.1)

Scientific classification
- Kingdom: Animalia
- Phylum: Chordata
- Class: Reptilia
- Order: Squamata
- Suborder: Gekkota
- Family: Gekkonidae
- Genus: Afroedura
- Species: A. nivaria

Binomial name
- Afroedura nivaria (Boulenger, 1894)
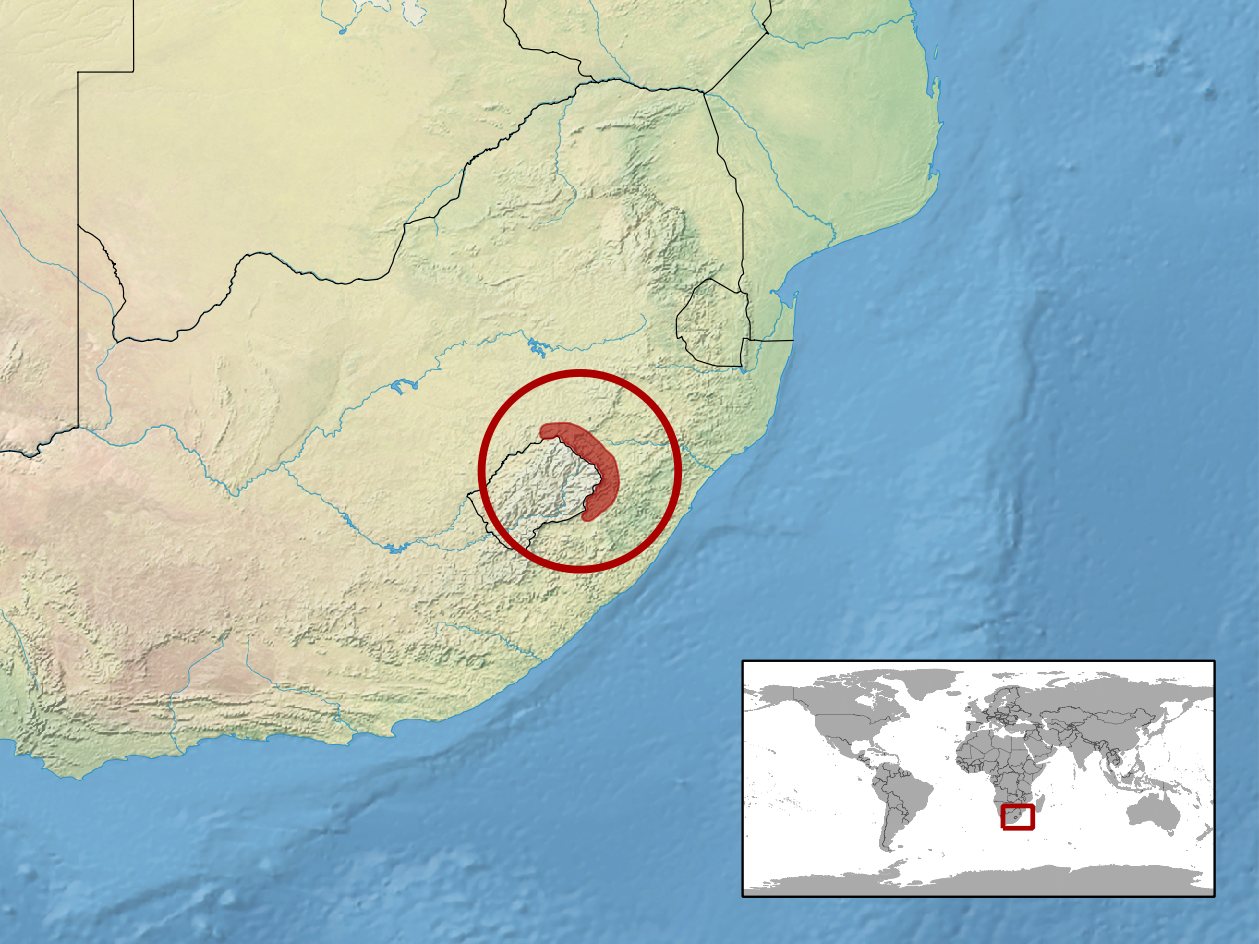
- Drakensberg rock gecko range

Synonyms
- Oedura nivaria

Species of lizard

The Drakensberg rock gecko, Drakensberg flat gecko, or mountain flat gecko (Afroedura nivaria) is a species of African gecko found in South Africa and Lesotho.
