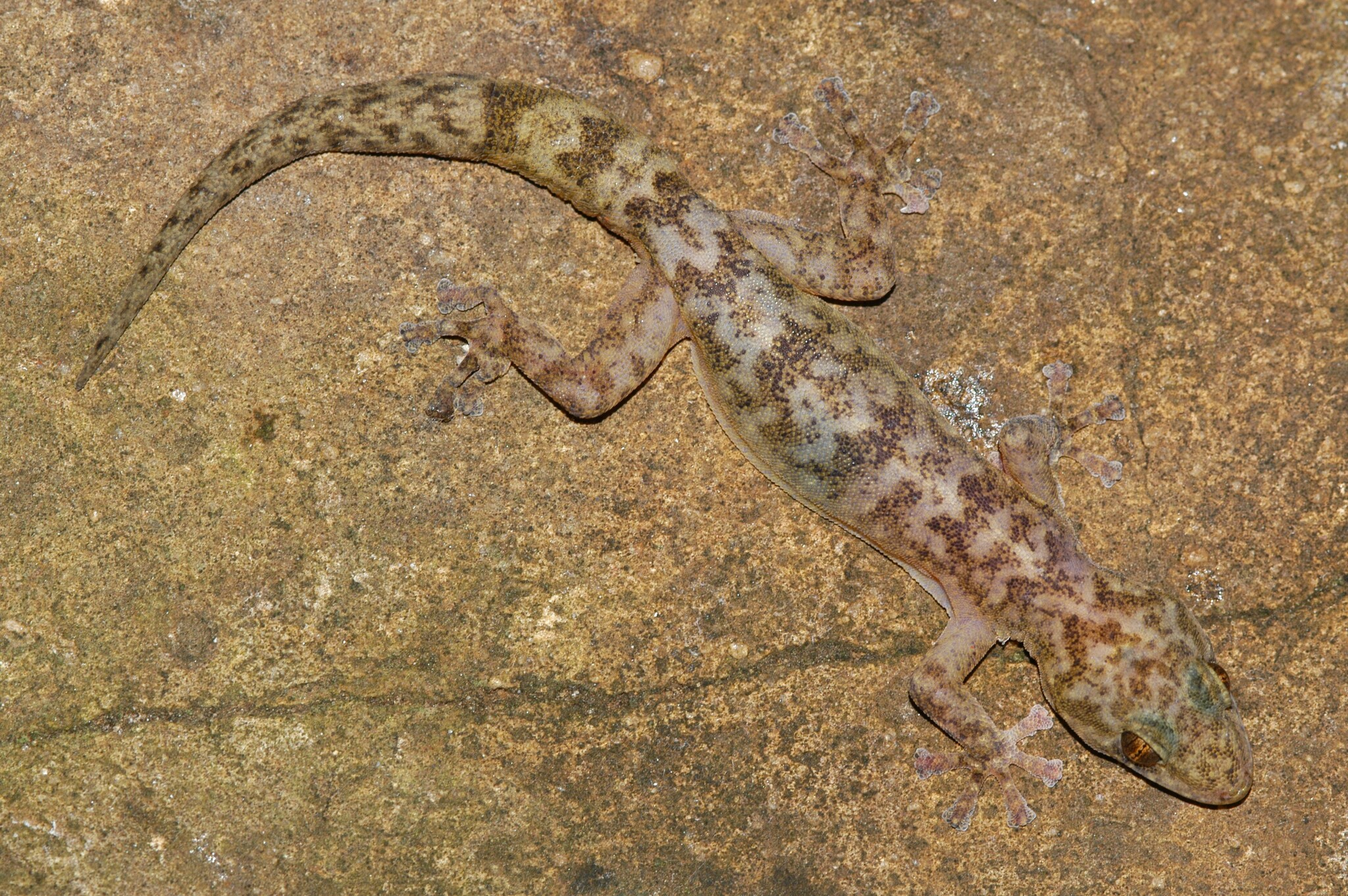

Conservation status
- Near Threatened (IUCN 3.1)

Scientific classification
- Kingdom: Animalia
- Phylum: Chordata
- Class: Reptilia
- Order: Squamata
- Suborder: Gekkota
- Family: Gekkonidae
- Genus: Afroedura
- Species: A. multiporis

Binomial name
- Afroedura multiporis (Hewitt, 1925)

Synonyms
- Oedura pondolia multiporis; Afroedura pondolia multiporis

= Multipored rock gecko =

Species of lizard

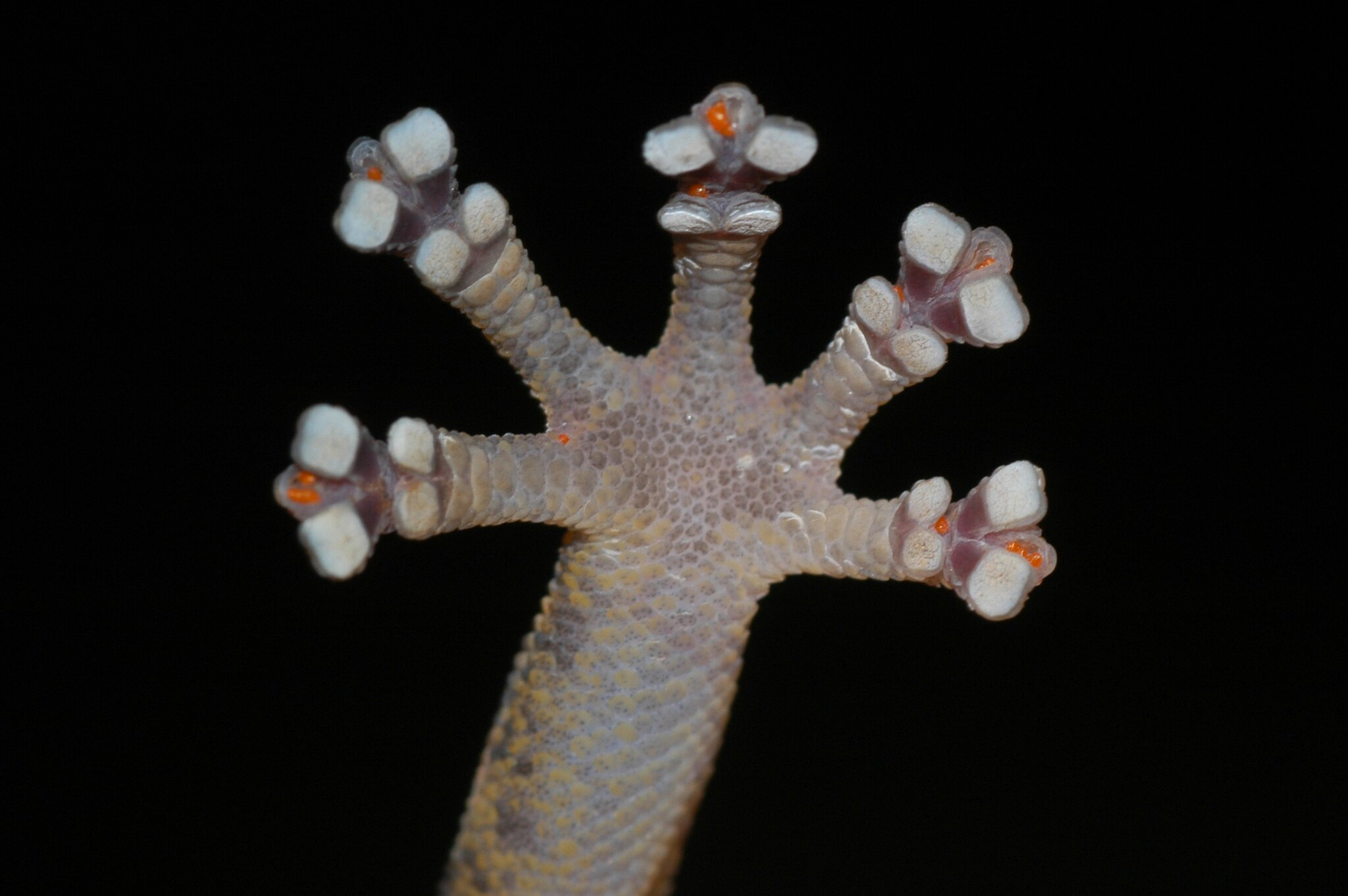
Close-up of toe pads

The multipored rock gecko or Woodbush flat gecko (Afroedura multiporis) is a species of African gecko found in South Africa.

== Distribution ==
A. multiporis is endemic to Limpopo, South Africa.

== Habitat ==
A. multiporis is found within granite and quartzite cliffs at elevations of 1,400-1,800 meters. This species prefers the vegetation types of the Mamabolo Mountain Bushveld, Woodbush Granite Grasslands, and the Poung Dolomite Mountain Bushveld.

== Conservation status ==
As of 2022 The IUCN lists A. multiporis as Near Threatened. The IUCN also states that the largest concurrent threat to A. multiporis is heavy afforestation that fragments and reduces the range the species inhabits. The construction of Ebenezer Dam in 1959 also severely disrupted the available habitat, although is unlikely to cause further reduction in available habitat.

Much of A. multiporis' remaining Extent of Occurrence (646 km^{2}) lies within protected land. However, the unprotected land is subject to extensive land transformation.
