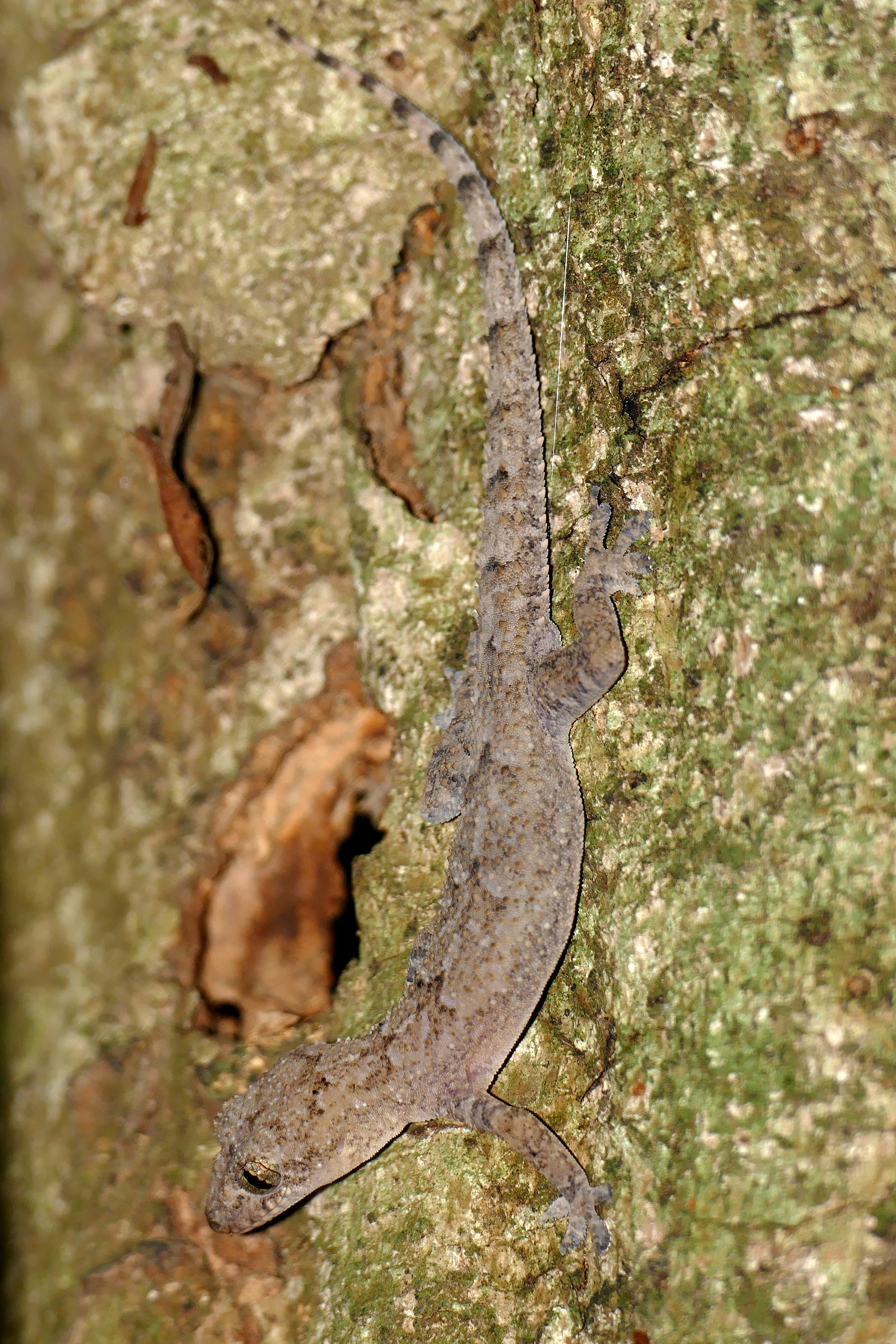

Conservation status
- Least Concern (IUCN 3.1)

Scientific classification
- Kingdom: Animalia
- Phylum: Chordata
- Class: Reptilia
- Order: Squamata
- Suborder: Gekkota
- Family: Gekkonidae
- Genus: Afroedura
- Species: A. pondolia

Binomial name
- Afroedura pondolia (Hewitt, 1925)

Synonyms
- Oedura pondolia; Oedura pondoensis

= Pondo rock gecko =

Species of lizard

The Pondo rock gecko or Pondo flat gecko (Afroedura pondolia) is a species of African gecko found in South Africa and Eswatini.
