= Queenstown rock gecko =

Conservation status
- Least Concern (IUCN 3.1)

Scientific classification
- Kingdom: Animalia
- Phylum: Chordata
- Class: Reptilia
- Order: Squamata
- Suborder: Gekkota
- Family: Gekkonidae
- Genus: Afroedura
- Species: A. tembulica

Binomial name
- Afroedura tembulica (Hewitt, 1926)

Synonyms
- Oedura tembulica

Species of lizard

The Queenstown rock gecko or Tembu flat gecko (Afroedura tembulica) is a species of African gecko found in South Africa.
