= Afroedura leoloensis =

Scientific classification
- Kingdom: Animalia
- Phylum: Chordata
- Class: Reptilia
- Order: Squamata
- Suborder: Gekkota
- Family: Gekkonidae
- Genus: Afroedura
- Species: A. leoloensis

Binomial name
- Afroedura leoloensis Jacobsen, Kuhn, Jackman & Bauer, 2014

Species of lizard

Afroedura leoloensis, also known as the Leolo rock gecko, is a species of African gecko, first found in the Limpopo and Mpumalanga provinces of South Africa.
