= Afroedura broadleyi =

Scientific classification
- Kingdom: Animalia
- Phylum: Chordata
- Class: Reptilia
- Order: Squamata
- Suborder: Gekkota
- Family: Gekkonidae
- Genus: Afroedura
- Species: A. broadleyi

Binomial name
- Afroedura broadleyi Jacobsen, Kuhn, Jackman & Bauer, 2014

Species of lizard

Afroedura broadleyi, also known commonly as Broadley's rock gecko, is a species of lizard in the family Gekkonidae. The species is endemic to South Africa.

== Etymology ==
The specific name, broadleyi, is in honor of African herpetologist Donald George Broadley.

== Geographic range ==
A. broadleyi was first found in Limpopo province, South Africa.
