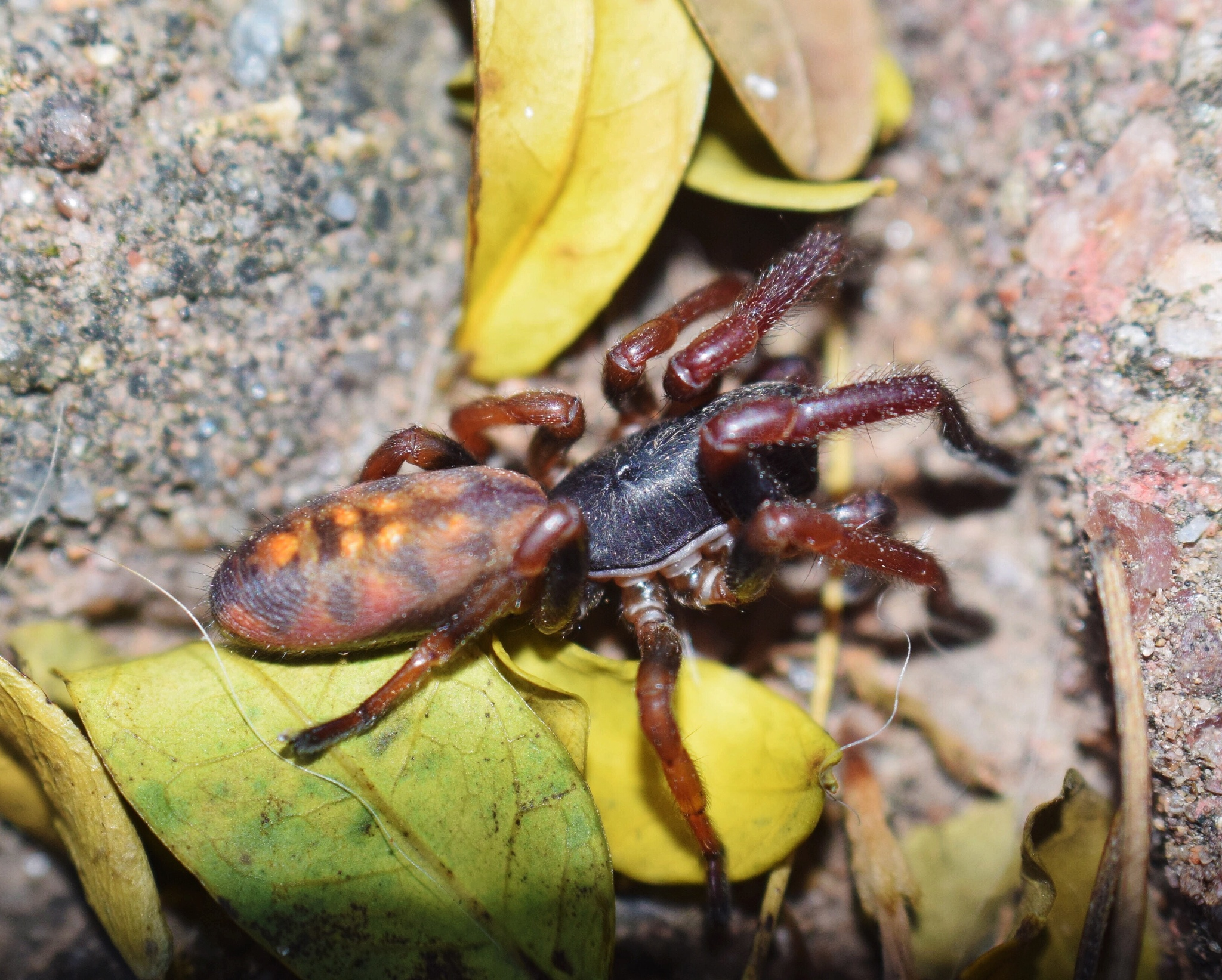

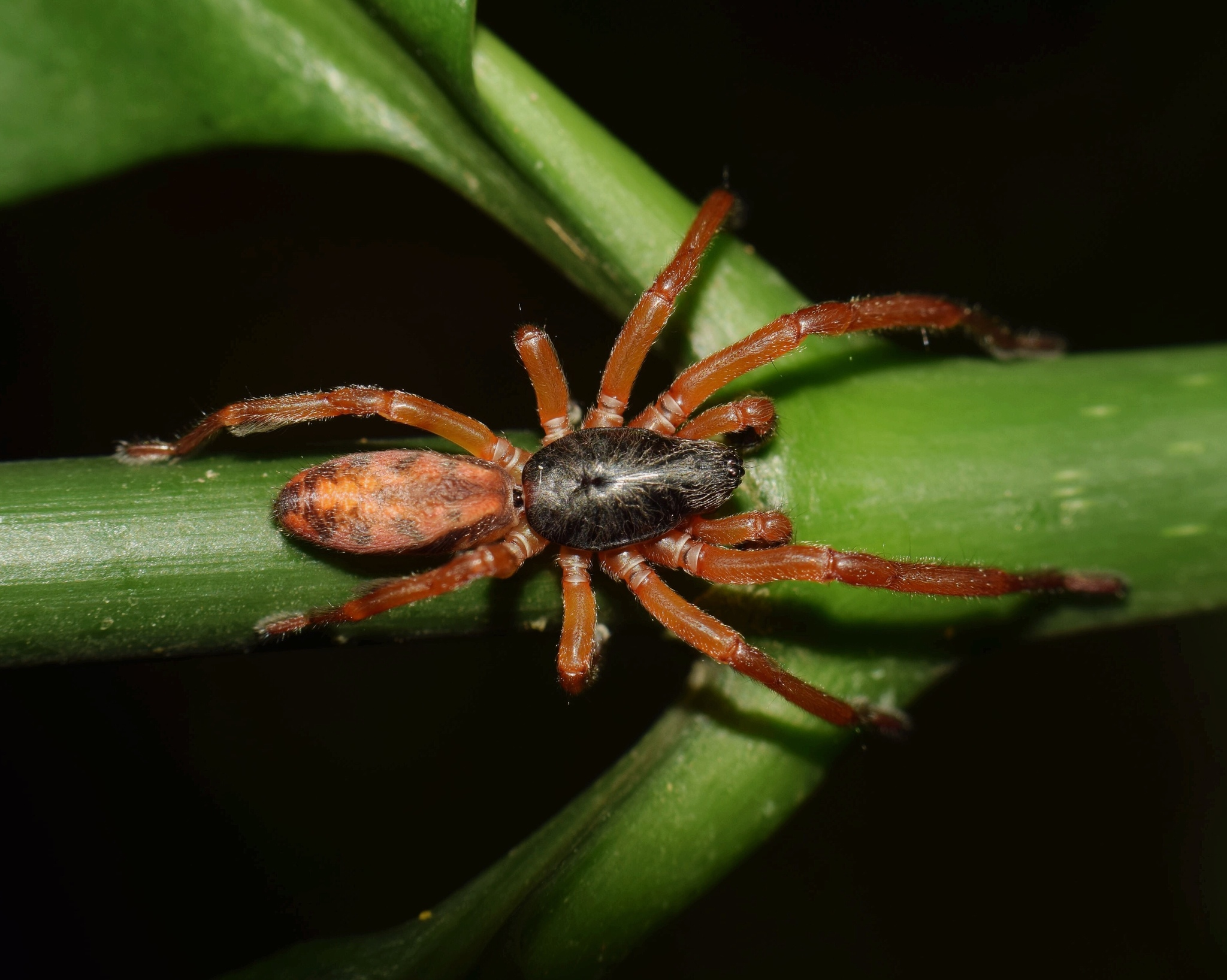

Scientific classification
- Kingdom: Animalia
- Phylum: Arthropoda
- Subphylum: Chelicerata
- Class: Arachnida
- Order: Araneae
- Infraorder: Araneomorphae
- Family: Zodariidae
- Genus: Cicynethus
- Species: C. decoratus

Binomial name
- Cicynethus decoratus (Lawrence, 1952)

Synonyms
- Chariobas decorata Lawrence, 1952

= Cicynethus decoratus =

Decorated Cicynethus Zodariid spider

Species of spider

Cicynethus decoratus is a species of spider in the family Zodariidae. It is endemic to South Africa and is commonly known as the decorated Cicynethus Zodariid spider.

== Distribution ==
Cicynethus decoratus is found in the Eastern Cape and KwaZulu-Natal provinces of South Africa. It has been recorded from several localities including Addo Elephant National Park, Port St Johns District, Port Edward, Oribi Gorge Nature Reserve, and Kloof near Durban.

== Habitat ==
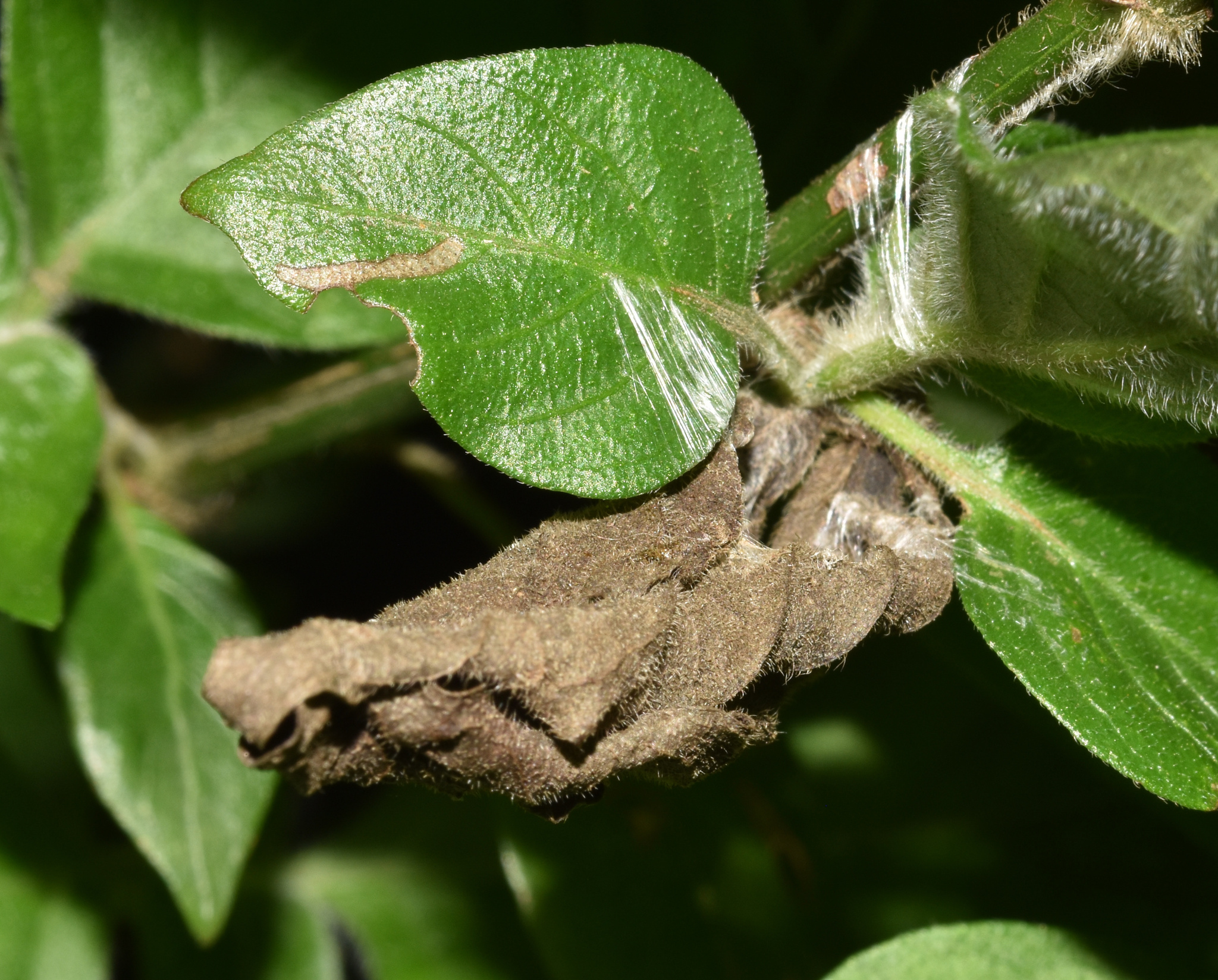

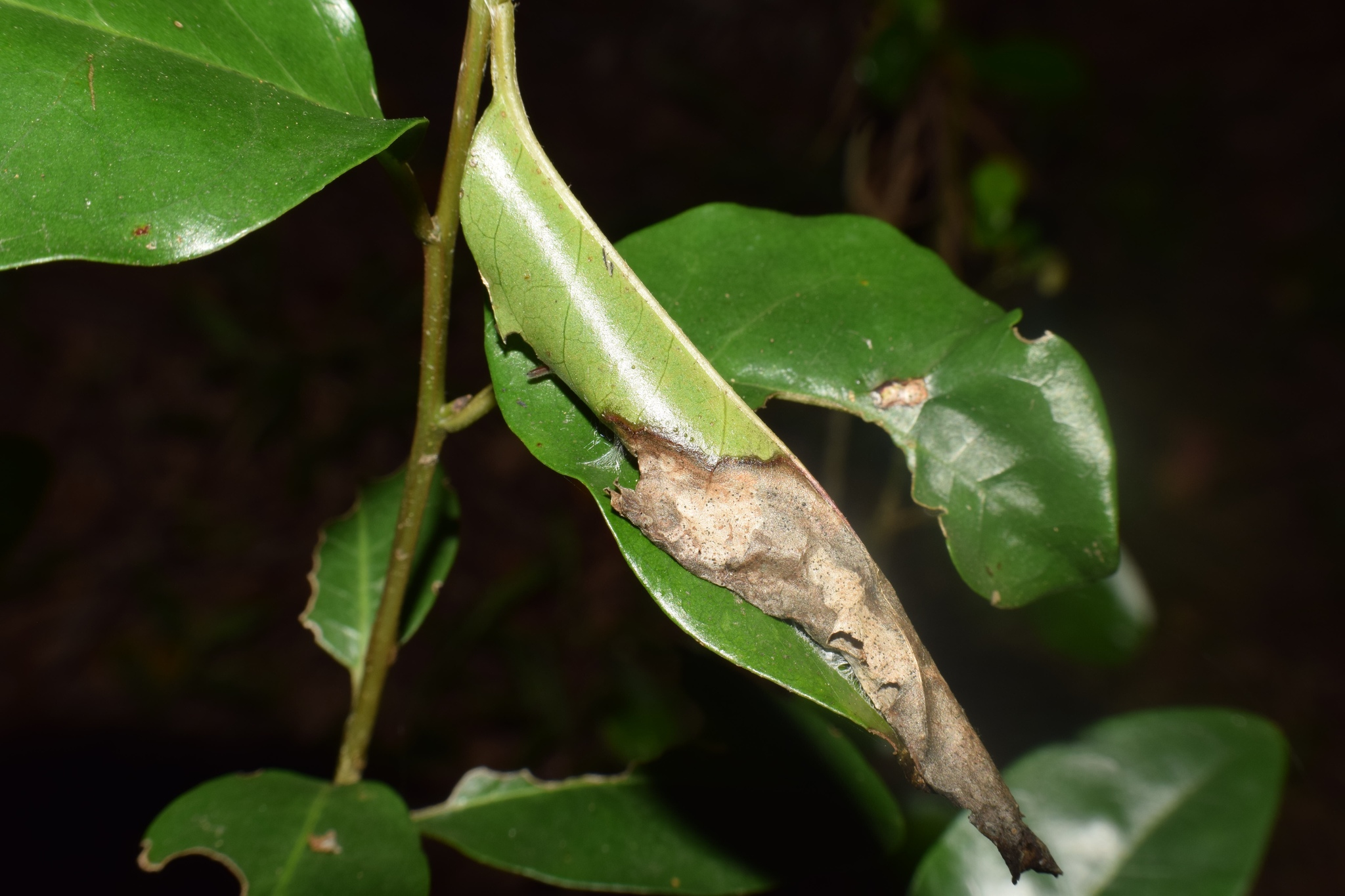

The species inhabits areas at altitudes ranging from 63 to 416 m above sea level. It is a ground-dwelling species that has been collected by sifting leaf litter and humus.

== Description ==
Females of Cicynethus decoratus have a total length of 12.57 mm. The carapace is reddish-brown with a paler median spot near the posterior margin. The chelicerae are reddish-brown with a pale patch near the fangs. The endites are reddish-brown, fading to yellowish in front, while the labium is dark reddish-brown and paler in front. The sternum is uniform dark reddish-brown and darkened along the anterior margins.

The legs are yellowish-orange, with the anterior legs being darker reddish-brown. The opisthosoma is cream-colored with a distinctive dark pattern on the dorsum consisting of lateral bands with three ill-defined triangles and a median band with a diamond, stripe, two chevrons, and a two-segmented spot in front of the spinnerets.

== Conservation ==
The species is listed as Data Deficient because the male remains unknown and more research is needed to understand its status. It is protected in several areas including Oribi Gorge Nature Reserve, Ingogo Forest Reserve, and Addo Elephant National Park.

== Taxonomy ==
The genus was revised by Rudy Jocqué in 2018.
