= Afroedura halli =

Conservation status
- Least Concern (IUCN 3.1)

Scientific classification
- Kingdom: Animalia
- Phylum: Chordata
- Class: Reptilia
- Order: Squamata
- Suborder: Gekkota
- Family: Gekkonidae
- Genus: Afroedura
- Species: A. halli

Binomial name
- Afroedura halli (Hewitt, 1935)

Synonyms
- Oedura halli Hewitt, 1935; Afroedura karroica halli — Loveridge, 1947; Afroedura halli — Branch, 1998

Species of lizard

Afroedura halli, also known commonly as Hall's flat gecko or the inland rock gecko, is a species of gecko, a lizard in the family Gekkonidae. The species is native to southern Africa.

== Etymology ==
The specific name, halli, is in honor of Charles Hall who collected the holotype.

== Geographic name ==
A. halli is found in Lesotho and South Africa.

== Habitat ==
The preferred natural habitat of A. halli is boulders and sandstone cliffs of mountain tops, at altitudes of 1,750–2,200 m (5,740–7,220 ft).

== Reproduction ==
A. halli is oviparous.
