= Afroedura langi =

Conservation status
- Least Concern (IUCN 3.1)

Scientific classification
- Kingdom: Animalia
- Phylum: Chordata
- Class: Reptilia
- Order: Squamata
- Suborder: Gekkota
- Family: Gekkonidae
- Genus: Afroedura
- Species: A. langi

Binomial name
- Afroedura langi (FitzSimons, 1930)

Synonyms
- Oedura langi; Afroedura pondolia langi

Species of lizard

Afroedura langi, also known as Lang's rock gecko, Lang's flat gecko, or Lowveld flat gecko, is a species of African gecko found in South Africa and Mozambique.
