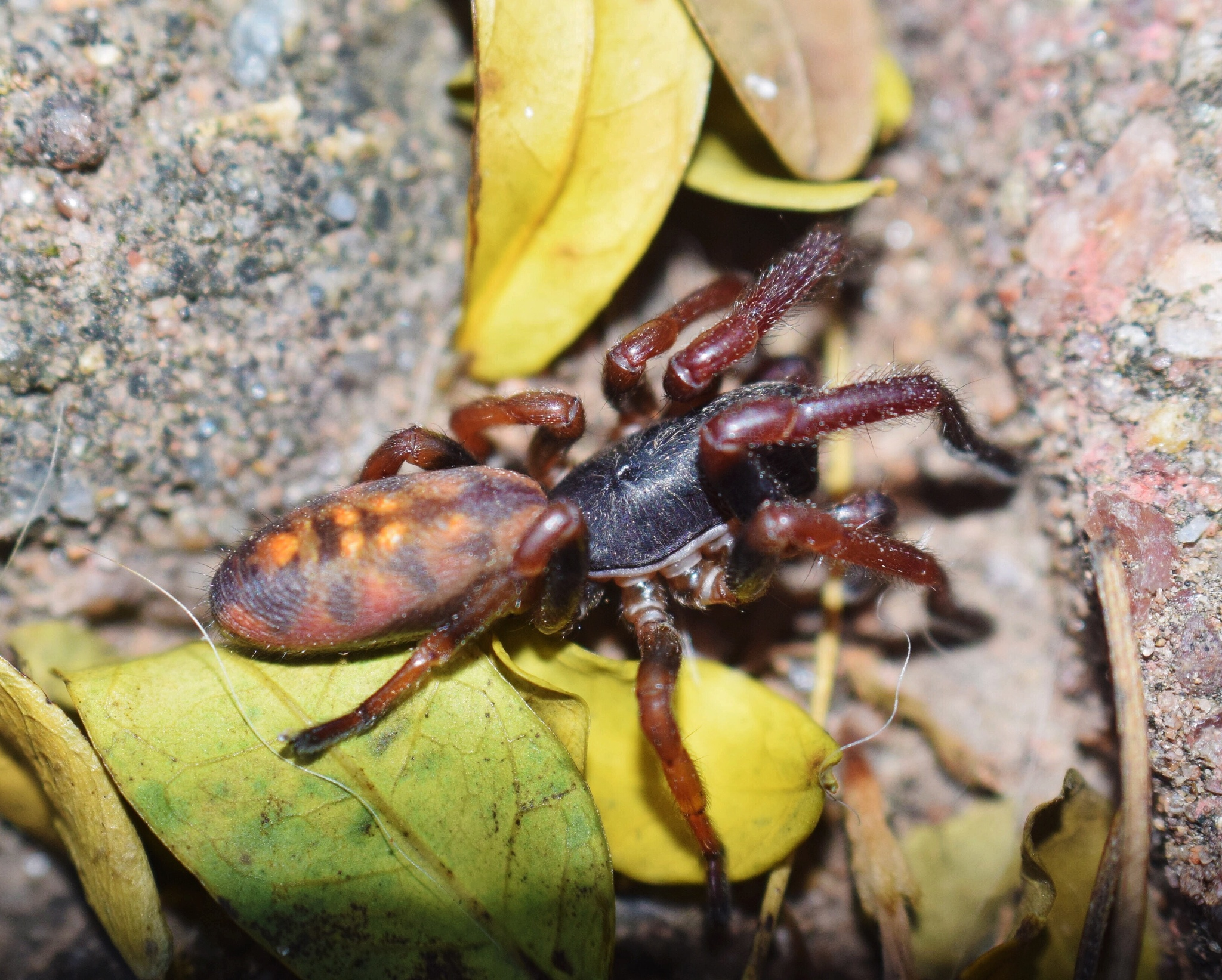
- C. decoratus
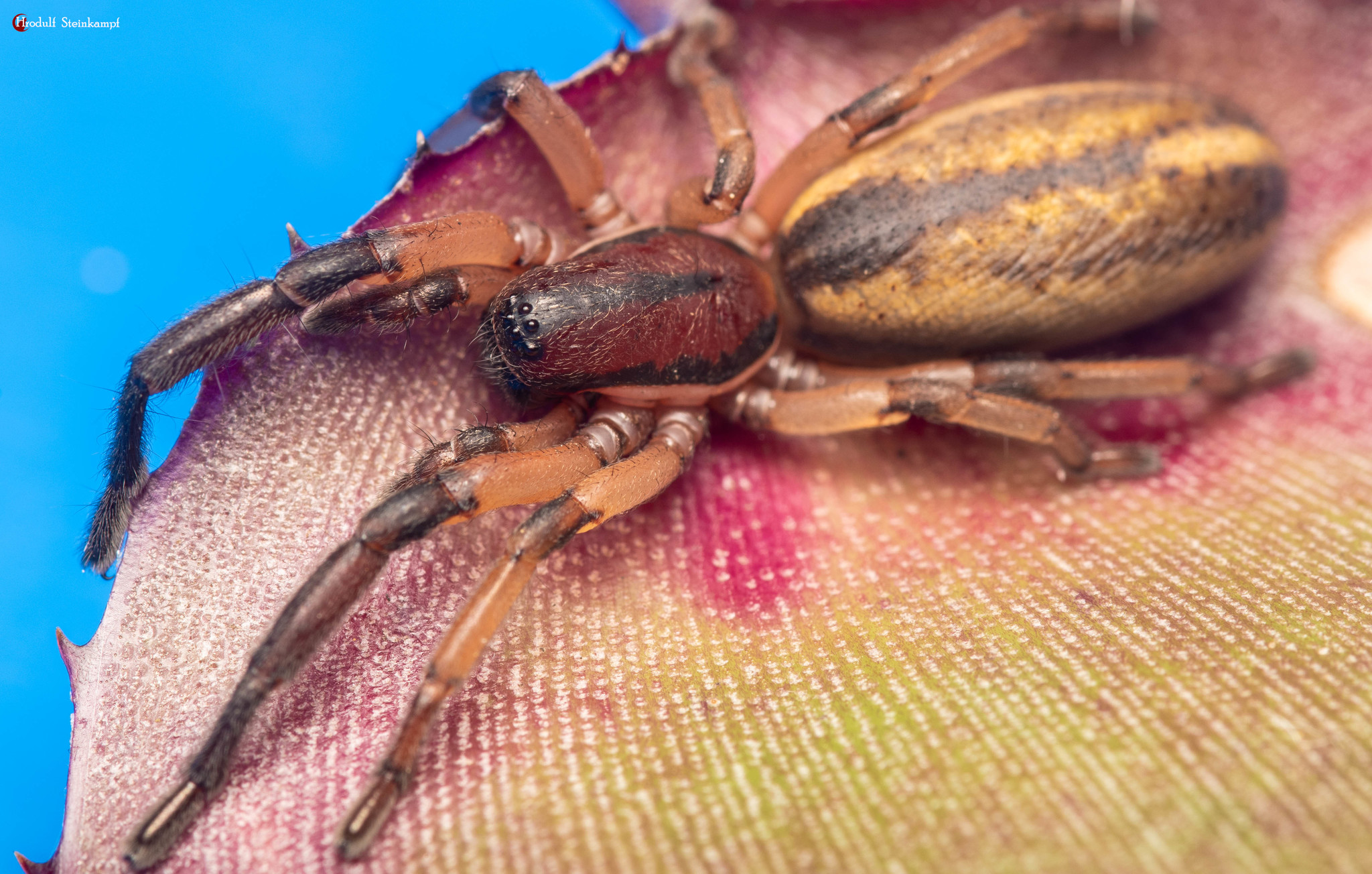
- female C. subtropicalis

Scientific classification
- Kingdom: Animalia
- Phylum: Arthropoda
- Subphylum: Chelicerata
- Class: Arachnida
- Order: Araneae
- Infraorder: Araneomorphae
- Family: Zodariidae
- Genus: Cicynethus; Simon, 1910

Type species
- Cicynethus acanthopus

Species
- 7, see text

= Cicynethus =

Genus of spiders

Cicynethus is a genus of southern African spiders in the family Zodariidae with seven species. It was first described in 1910 by Eugène Simon, including his earlier described species C. peringueyi.

== Distribution ==
All species are endemic to Southern Africa, with four only found in South Africa.

== Species ==
As of September 2025, this genus includes seven species:

- Cicynethus acanthopus Simon, 1910 – Namibia (type species)
- Cicynethus acer Jocqué & Henrard, 2018 – Mozambique, South Africa
- Cicynethus decoratus (Lawrence, 1952) – South Africa
- Cicynethus floriumfontis Jocqué, 1991 – South Africa
- Cicynethus mossambicus Jocqué & Henrard, 2018 – Mozambique
- Cicynethus peringueyi (Simon, 1893) – South Africa
- Cicynethus subtropicalis (Lawrence, 1952) – South Africa
