= Afroedura granitica =

Conservation status
- Least Concern (IUCN 3.1)

Scientific classification
- Kingdom: Animalia
- Phylum: Chordata
- Class: Reptilia
- Order: Squamata
- Suborder: Gekkota
- Family: Gekkonidae
- Genus: Afroedura
- Species: A. granitica

Binomial name
- Afroedura granitica Jacobsen, Kuhn, Jackman & Bauer, 2014

Species of lizard

Afroedura granitica, also known as the granite rock gecko, is a species of African gecko, first found in the Limpopo and Mpumalanga provinces of South Africa.
