= Namaqua rock gecko =

Conservation status
- Least Concern (IUCN 3.1)

Scientific classification
- Kingdom: Animalia
- Phylum: Chordata
- Class: Reptilia
- Order: Squamata
- Suborder: Gekkota
- Family: Gekkonidae
- Genus: Afroedura
- Species: A. namaquensis

Binomial name
- Afroedura namaquensis (FitzSimons, 1938)

Synonyms
- Oedura namaquensis; Afroedura africana namaquensis

Species of lizard

The Namaqua rock gecko or Namaqua flat gecko (Afroedura namaquensis) is a species of African geckos found in South Africa.
