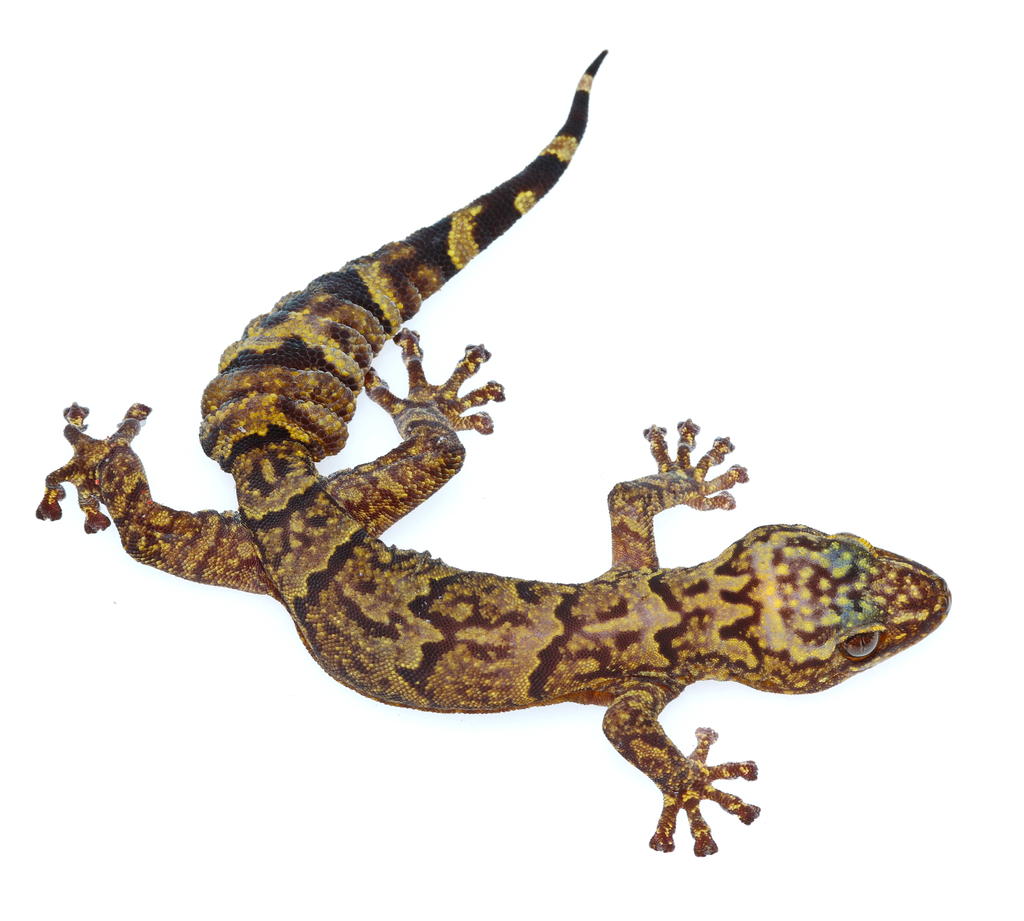

Conservation status
- Least Concern (IUCN 3.1)

Scientific classification
- Kingdom: Animalia
- Phylum: Chordata
- Class: Reptilia
- Order: Squamata
- Suborder: Gekkota
- Family: Gekkonidae
- Genus: Afroedura
- Species: A. hawequensis

Binomial name
- Afroedura hawequensis Mouton & Mostert, 1985

= Cape rock gecko =

Species of lizard

The Cape rock gecko or Hawequa flat gecko (Afroedura hawequensis) is a species of lizard in the family Gekkonidae. The species is endemic to South Africa.

== Distribution ==
A. hawequensis is endemic to the Du Toitskloof and Limietberg mountains in the Western Cape providence of South Africa.

== Habitat ==
A. hawequensis is commonly found in mesic habitats with sandstone boulders and outcroppings within fynbos. A. hawequensis is found between elevations of 1,100m-1,400m.

== Conservation status ==
The Cape rock gecko has gone through a number of different statuses within the IUCN redlist. From 1996 until 2017 the species was classified as near threatened. In 2018, the species would be upgraded to Least Concern. The IUCN cites that despite the species small distribution, A. hawequensis can be found abundantly within protected areas, with no decline in habitat or population.
