= Afroedura marleyi =

Conservation status
- Least Concern (IUCN 3.1)

Scientific classification
- Kingdom: Animalia
- Phylum: Chordata
- Class: Reptilia
- Order: Squamata
- Suborder: Gekkota
- Family: Gekkonidae
- Genus: Afroedura
- Species: A. marleyi

Binomial name
- Afroedura marleyi (FitzSimons, 1930)

Synonyms
- Oedura marleyi; Afroedura pondolia marleyi

Species of lizard

Afroedura marleyi, also known as Marley's rock gecko or Marley's flat gecko, is a species of African gecko found in South Africa and Eswatini.
