= Tulbaghia coddii =

Scientific classification
- Kingdom: Plantae
- Clade: Embryophytes
- Clade: Tracheophytes
- Clade: Spermatophytes
- Clade: Angiosperms
- Clade: Monocots
- Order: Asparagales
- Family: Amaryllidaceae
- Subfamily: Allioideae
- Genus: Tulbaghia
- Species: T. coddii

Binomial name
- Tulbaghia coddii Vosa & R.B.Burb.

Synonyms
- Tulbaghia poetica R.B.Burb.

Species of flowering plant

Tulbaghia coddii is a geophyte plant belonging to the Amaryllidaceae family. The species is endemic to Mpumalanga and appears from Mariepskop to Mount Sheba and Graskop. It currently has a range of 272 km² and in the past has lost large parts of its habitat to plantations. More than 80% of its remaining habitat is in protected areas such as the Blyde River Canyon and the population is currently stable. The plant is considered rare.
