= Cicynethus peringueyi =

Scientific classification
- Kingdom: Animalia
- Phylum: Arthropoda
- Subphylum: Chelicerata
- Class: Arachnida
- Order: Araneae
- Infraorder: Araneomorphae
- Family: Zodariidae
- Genus: Cicynethus
- Species: C. peringueyi

Binomial name
- Cicynethus peringueyi (Simon, 1893)

Synonyms
- Patiscus peringueyi Simon, 1893; Patiscana peringueyi Strand, 1934

Species of spider

Cicynethus peringueyi is a species of spider in the family Zodariidae. It is endemic to the Western Cape province of South Africa.

== Etymology ==
The species is named after Louis Albert Péringuey, a French-born South African entomologist who made significant contributions to the study of southern African insects.

== Distribution ==
Cicynethus peringueyi is known only from Cape Town in the Western Cape province.

== Habitat ==
The species occurs at approximately 7 m above sea level in the Fynbos biome.

== Description ==
Cicynethus peringueyi is known only from juvenile specimens, making a complete description impossible. The available juvenile material shows a color pattern that resembles that of C. floriumfontis, suggesting that C. peringueyi is a synonym.

== Conservation ==
The species is listed as Data Deficient because only juvenile specimens are known and adults remain undescribed. More sampling is needed to collect adult material and determine the species' true range and taxonomic status.
