= Afroedura pienaari =

Scientific classification
- Kingdom: Animalia
- Phylum: Chordata
- Class: Reptilia
- Order: Squamata
- Suborder: Gekkota
- Family: Gekkonidae
- Genus: Afroedura
- Species: A. pienaari

Binomial name
- Afroedura pienaari Jacobsen, Kuhn, Jackman & Bauer, 2014

Species of lizard

Afroedura pienaari, also known as Pienaar's rock gecko, is a species of African geckos, first found in the Limpopo and Mpumalanga provinces of South Africa.
