= Afroedura tirasensis =

Scientific classification
- Kingdom: Animalia
- Phylum: Chordata
- Class: Reptilia
- Order: Squamata
- Suborder: Gekkota
- Family: Gekkonidae
- Genus: Afroedura
- Species: A. tirasensis

Binomial name
- Afroedura tirasensis Haacke, 1965

Synonyms
- Afroedura africana tirasensis Haacke, 1965

Species of lizard

Afroedura tirasensis, also known as African rock gecko, is a species of African gecko endemic to Namibia. It was originally described as a subspecies of Afroedura africana.
