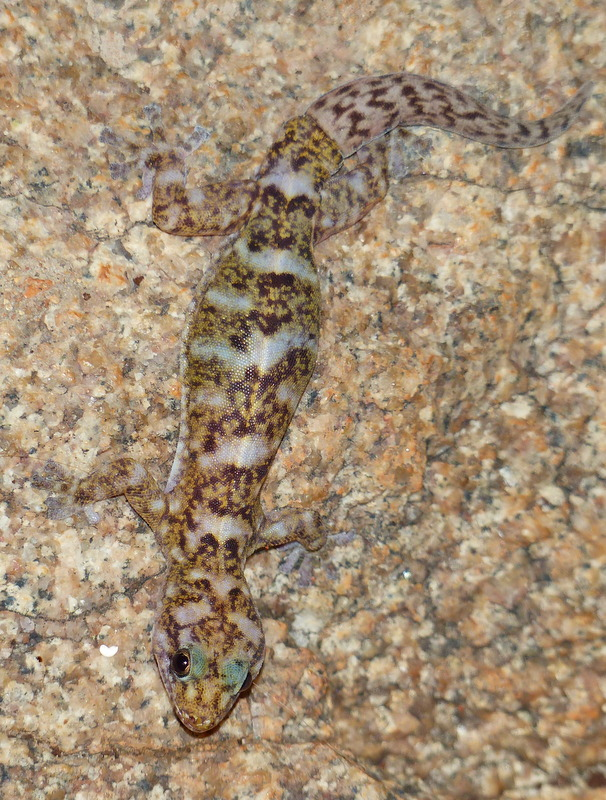

Scientific classification
- Domain: Eukaryota
- Kingdom: Animalia
- Phylum: Chordata
- Class: Reptilia
- Order: Squamata
- Infraorder: Gekkota
- Family: Gekkonidae
- Genus: Afroedura
- Species: A. transvaalica

Binomial name
- Afroedura transvaalica (Hewitt, 1925)

Synonyms
- Oedura transvaalica Hewitt,1925; Oedura transvaalensis FitzSimons,1930

= Transvaal rock gecko =

Species of lizard

The Transvaal rock gecko (Afroedura transvaalica) is a species of gecko endemic to Southern Africa.

== Common names ==
Additional common names for Afroedura transvaalica include Limpopo flat gecko, Transvaal flat gecko, and Zimbabwe flat gecko.

== Taxonomy ==
It was originally described as a new species and given its binomial name by South African herpetologist John Hewitt in 1925.

== Geographic range ==
Both the specific name, transvaalica, and the English common name, Transvaal flat gecko, are misnomers, in a sense, as A. transvaalica occurs almost exclusively in Zimbabwe; however, small populations with small distributions occur in northern Limpopo, South Africa and in north-western Mozambique. The largest part of its range, 90% or more, covers Zimbabwe, and it is one of the species that make up Zimbabwe's endemic and near-endemic gecko fauna.

== Habitat ==
A. transvaalica occurs in mesic savanna across Zimbabwe, neither at high nor low altitude, rather associated with granite and sandstone outcrops, at altitudes of 1,000 to 1,800 metres (3,300 to 5,900 ft).

== Behaviour ==
Transvaal flat geckos are very social geckos and nocturnal; they hide during the day under flakes of rock.

== Diet ==
A. transvaalica is insectivorous and will tackle large beetles, crickets, and grasshoppers.

== Breeding ==
Sexual mature females of A. transvaalica lay a pair of hard-shelled eggs usually in a communal nesting site. The eggs are soft and adhesive when first laid.

== Subspecies ==
No subspecies is recognized. The race formerly known as Afroedura t. loveridgei has been raised to full species status as Afroedura loveridgei. It occurs only in suitable habitat around Tete in the Zambesi River Valley.
