= Haack =

Haack is a German and Dutch occupational surname, deriving from a maker or seller of tools or implements. Haacke is a variant form. They are derived from the Old German word haak, meaning "hook" or "crook", or the Old German word hak, meaning a hoe or mattock. The name is first recorded in the 14th century, in the area around present-day Saxony and Thuringia.

Notable people with the surname include:

- Bruce Haack (1931–1988), Canadian musician and composer
- Dieter Haack (born 1934), German politician
- Fred C. Haack (c. 1873–1944), American politician
- Günther Haack (1929–1965), German actor
- Matt Haack (born 1994), American football player
- Morton Haack (1924–1987), American costume designer
- Käthe Haack (1897–1986), German actress
- Susan Haack (1945–2026), English philosopher
- Wolfgang Haack (1902–1994), German aerodynamicist
- Christina Haack (born 1983), American TV personality

== See also ==
- Sears-Haack body
- Vilsmeier-Haack reaction
