= Cicynethus floriumfontis =

Scientific classification
- Kingdom: Animalia
- Phylum: Arthropoda
- Subphylum: Chelicerata
- Class: Arachnida
- Order: Araneae
- Infraorder: Araneomorphae
- Family: Zodariidae
- Genus: Cicynethus
- Species: C. floriumfontis

Binomial name
- Cicynethus floriumfontis Jocqué, 1991

Species of spider

Cicynethus floriumfontis is a species of spider in the family Zodariidae. It is endemic to the Eastern Cape province of South Africa.

== Distribution ==
Cicynethus floriumfontis is known only from two localities in the Eastern Cape, Cradock and Middelburg.

== Habitat ==
The species occurs at altitudes ranging from 881 to 1287 m above sea level in the Nama Karoo biome. Specimens from Middelburg were collected from pitfall traps in areas with harvester termites.

== Description ==
Cicynethus floriumfontis has a yellowish-brown body with distinctive markings. The carapace displays three dark stripes, while the opisthosoma shows dark markings. Throughout the body, the bases of setae have black spots, and the legs are spotted with stripes on the femora and patellae.

== Conservation ==
The species is listed as Data Deficient due to its limited known distribution and the need for more sampling to determine its true range and status.
