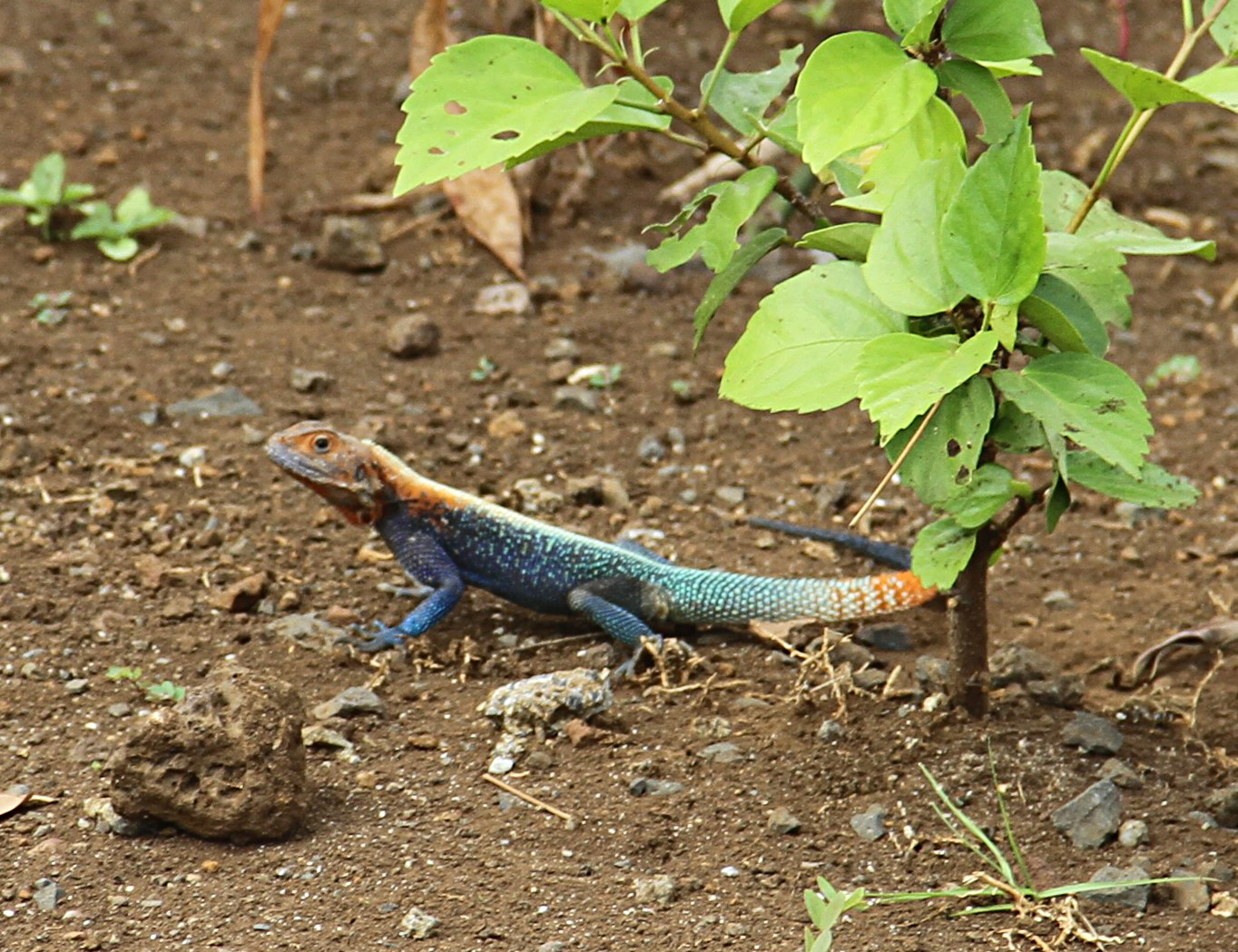

Conservation status
- Least Concern (IUCN 3.1)

Scientific classification
- Kingdom: Animalia
- Phylum: Chordata
- Class: Reptilia
- Order: Squamata
- Suborder: Iguania
- Family: Agamidae
- Genus: Agama
- Species: A. lebretoni

Binomial name
- Agama lebretoni Wagner, Barej & Schmitz, 2009

= Agama lebretoni =

Species of lizard

Agama lebretoni is a species of lizard in the family Agamidae. The species is native to parts of Central Africa and West Africa.

== Etymology ==
The specific name, lebretoni, is in honor of Australian herpetologist Matthew LeBreton.

== Description ==
Relatively large for the genus Agama, adult males of A. lebretoni exceed 25 cm (9.8 in) in total length (including tail). Males have a red head and nape, and a blue body with a white vertebral stripe. The tail is whitish proximally, then red, then blue distally.

== Geographic range ==
Agama lebretoni is found in Cameroon, Equatorial Guinea, Gabon, and Nigeria.

== Habitat ==
The preferred natural habitat of A. lebretoni is open dry forest or savanna, at altitudes from sea level to 650 m (2,130 ft), but it also has been found on buildings in villages.

== Reproduction ==
Agama lebretoni is oviparous.

== Gallery ==
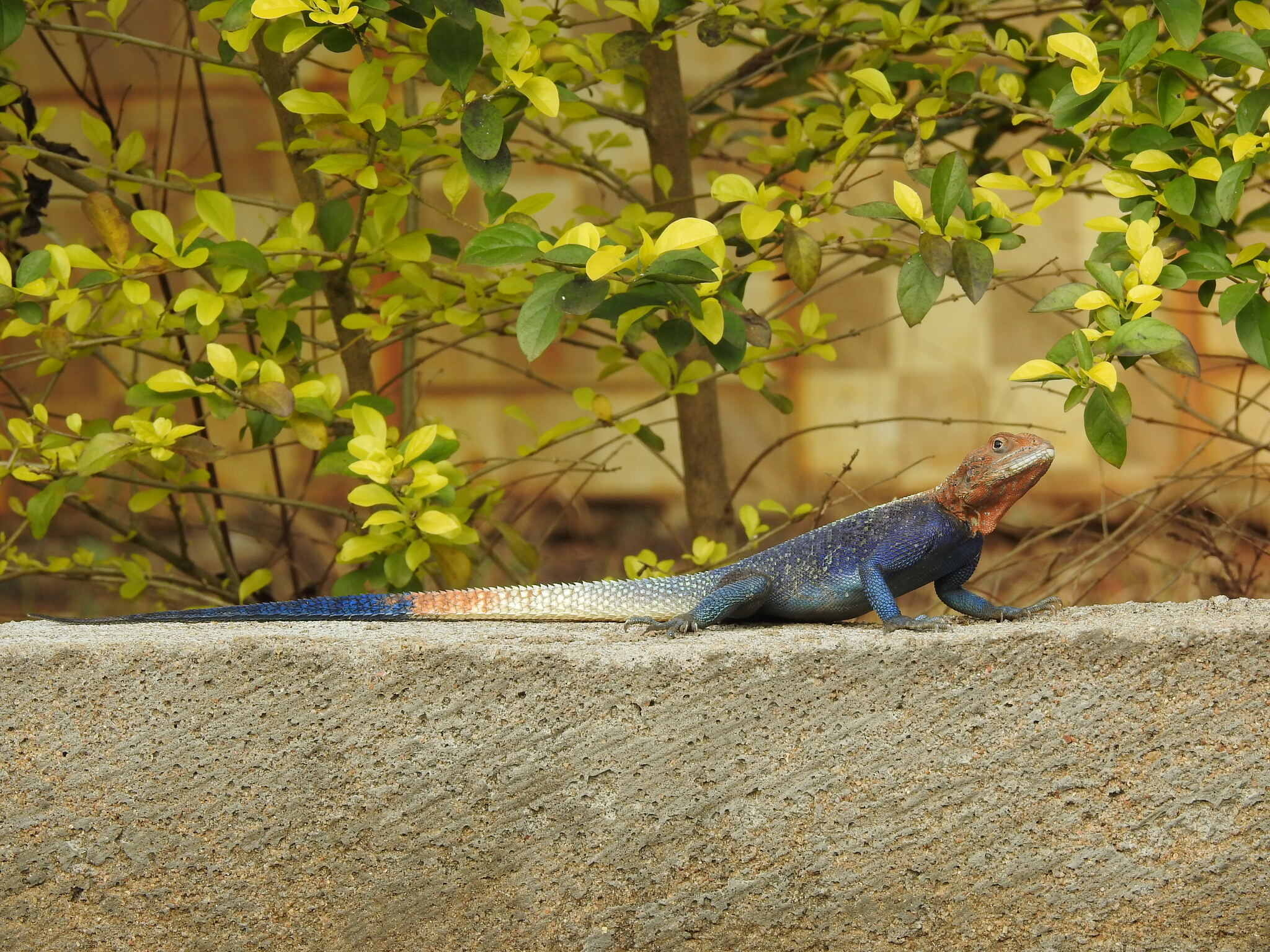

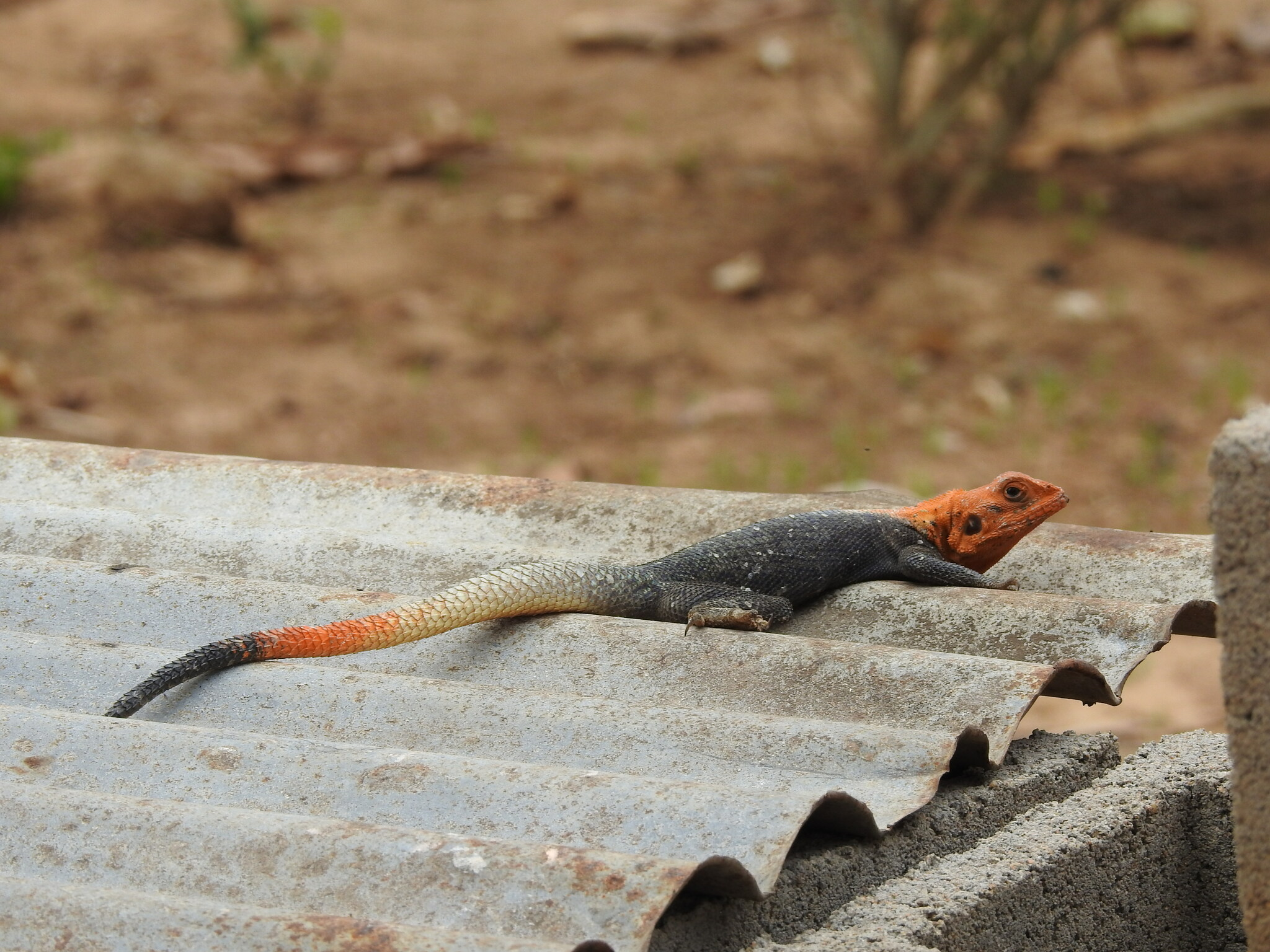

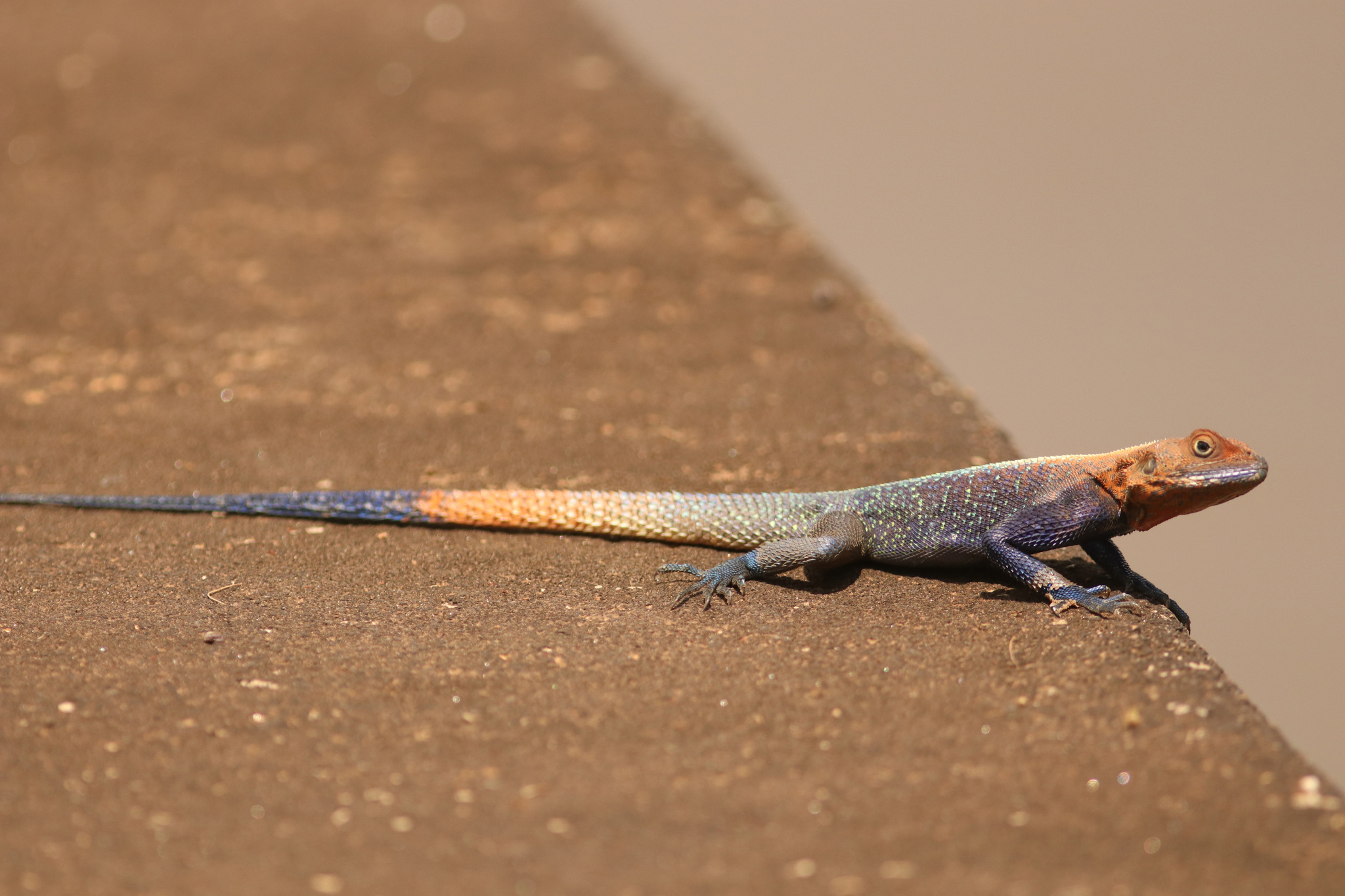
