= Afroedura rondavelica =

Blyde River flat gecko

Conservation status
- Data Deficient (IUCN 3.1)

Scientific classification
- Kingdom: Animalia
- Phylum: Chordata
- Class: Reptilia
- Order: Squamata
- Suborder: Gekkota
- Family: Gekkonidae
- Genus: Afroedura
- Species: A. rondavelica

Binomial name
- Afroedura rondavelica Jacobsen, Kuhn, Jackman & Bauer, 2014

Species of lizard

Afroedura rondavelica, also known as the Blyde River flat gecko or the rondavel rock gecko, is a species of African gecko in the family Gekkonidae. The species was first found in the Blyde River Canyon of South Africa. Its specific name and one of its common names refer to the rondavel, a southern African hut-type structure.

== Description ==
Medium-sized for its genus, Afroedura rondavelica may attain a snout-to-vent length (SVL) of 5.5 cm (2.2 in). Males have 7–9 precloacal pores.

== Geographic distribution ==
The Blyde River flat gecko was first found in 1991 at a single site in the vicinity of the Three Rondavels in the Blyde River Canyon.

In 2025, after 34 years, the Endangered Wildlife Trust said that it found the species again at the same site.

== Habitat ==
The preferred natural habitat of Afroedura rondavelica is rocky areas in savanna, at elevations around 1,300 m (4,300 ft).

== Reproduction ==
Afroedura rondavelica is oviparous.
