= Haacke's rock gecko =

Conservation status
- Least Concern (IUCN 3.1)

Scientific classification
- Kingdom: Animalia
- Phylum: Chordata
- Class: Reptilia
- Order: Squamata
- Suborder: Gekkota
- Family: Gekkonidae
- Genus: Afroedura
- Species: A. haackei

Binomial name
- Afroedura haackei Onderstall, 1984

Synonyms
- Afroedura pondolia haackei Onderstall, 1984; Afroedura multiporis haackei — Jacobsen, 1992; Afroedura pondolia haackei — Kluge, 1993; Afroedura multiporis haackei — Branch, 1998; Afroedura haackei — Jacobsen, Kuhn, Jackman & Bauer, 2014

Species of lizard

Haacke's rock gecko (Afroedura haackei), also known commonly as Haacke's flat gecko, is a species of lizard in the family Gekkonidae. The species is endemic to South Africa.

== Etymology ==
The specific name, haackei, is in honor of South African herpetologist Wulf Dietrich Haacke.

== Geographic range ==
A. haackei is found in Mpumalanga province, South Africa.

== Habitat ==
The preferred natural habitat of A. haackei is rocky areas of savanna, at altitudes of 500–1,100 m (1,600–3,600 ft), but it has also been found on walls of buildings.

== Behavior ==
A. haackei is terrestrial and rupicolous (rock-dwelling).

== Reproduction ==
A. haackei is oviparous.
