= Afroedura karroica =

Conservation status
- Least Concern (IUCN 3.1)

Scientific classification
- Kingdom: Animalia
- Phylum: Chordata
- Class: Reptilia
- Order: Squamata
- Suborder: Gekkota
- Family: Gekkonidae
- Genus: Afroedura
- Species: A. karroica

Binomial name
- Afroedura karroica (Hewitt, 1925)

Synonyms
- Oedura karroica; Oedura karroica wilmoti; Afroedura karroica karroica

Species of lizard

Afroedura karroica, also known as the inland rock gecko or Karoo flat gecko, is a species of African gecko found in South Africa and Lesotho.
