= Afroedura maripi =

Mariepskop flat gecko

Scientific classification
- Kingdom: Animalia
- Phylum: Chordata
- Class: Reptilia
- Order: Squamata
- Suborder: Gekkota
- Family: Gekkonidae
- Genus: Afroedura
- Species: A. maripi

Binomial name
- Afroedura maripi Jacobsen, Kuhn, Jackman & Bauer, 2014
- Mariepskop flat gecko distribution Extant (resident)

Species of lizard

Afroedura maripi, also known as the Mariepskop flat gecko or Maripi rock gecko, is a species of African gecko, first found in the Limpopo and Mpumalanga provinces of South Africa.
