= Afroedura africana =

Scientific classification
- Domain: Eukaryota
- Kingdom: Animalia
- Phylum: Chordata
- Class: Reptilia
- Order: Squamata
- Infraorder: Gekkota
- Family: Gekkonidae
- Genus: Afroedura
- Species: A. africana

Binomial name
- Afroedura africana (Boulenger, 1888)

Synonyms
- Oedura africana

Species of lizard

Afroedura africana, also known as African rock gecko, is a species of African gecko found in Namibia and South Africa.
