= Arthur Loveridge =

British biologist and herpetologist (1891–1980)

Arthur Loveridge (28 May 1891 – 16 February 1980) was a British biologist and herpetologist who wrote about animals of East Africa, particularly Tanzania, and of New Guinea. He gave scientific names to several gecko species in those regions.

== Life ==
Arthur Loveridge was born in Penarth, Wales, and was interested in natural history from childhood. He gained experience with the National Museum of Wales and Manchester Museum before becoming the curator of the Nairobi Museum (now the National Museum of Kenya) in 1914. During WW1, he joined the East African Mounted Rifles, later returning to the museum to build up the collections. He then became an assistant game warden in Tanganyika.

In 1924, he joined the Museum of Comparative Zoology in the grounds of Harvard University in Cambridge, Massachusetts, where he was the curator of herpetology. He returned to East Africa on several field trips and wrote many scientific papers before retiring from Harvard in 1957.

He married Mary Victoria Sloan in 1921, who died in 1972. They had one son.

On retirement, they moved to Saint Helena in the South Atlantic, from where he continued his interest in natural history, publishing several articles on the island's wildlife in the St Helena Wirebird and St Helena News Review in the 1960s & 1970s. He died in 1980 and was buried in St Helena next to his wife.

== Legacy ==
Several species and subspecies of reptiles are named in his honour, including Afroedura loveridgei, Anolis loveridgei, Atractus loveridgei, Elapsoidea loveridgei, Emoia loveridgei, Eryx colubrinus loveridgei, Indotyphlops loveridgei, Melanoseps loveridgei, and Philothamnus nitidus loveridgei.

Three species of endemic St Helenian insect were named after him. the cranefly Dicranomyia loveridgeana, the blackfly Simulium loveridgei, and the subgenus Loveridgeana of the hoverfly genus Sphaerophoria, with Spherophora (Loveridgeana) beattiei known on the island as Loveridge's hoverfly. His insect collecting satchel is on display in the St Helena Museum in Jamestown.

The Tanzanian fish Opsaridium loveridgii (Norman, 1922) is named after him.

== Partial bibliography ==
- Allen, Glover M.; Loveridge, Arthur (1927). "Mammals from the Uluguru and Usambara Mountains, Tanganyika Territory". Proceedings of the Boston Society of Natural History 38 (9):
- Barbour, T.; Loveridge, A. (1928). "A comparative study of the herpetological faunae of the Uluguru and Usambara mountains, Tanganyika territory with descriptions of new species". Memoirs of the Museum of Comparative Zoology at Harvard College 50 (2): 85–265.
- Coward, T.A. (1917). "Observations on the Nesting Habits of the Palm Swift (Tachornis parva, Licht) made by Mr Arthur Loveridge in German East Africa". Memoirs and Proceedings of the Manchester Literary and Philosophical Society, Session 1916-1917. 61 (2):
- Gans, Carl (1981). "In Memoriam: Arthur Loveridge". Herpetologica 37 (2): 117–121.
- Green, A.A. (editor) (1980). "Obituary: The Late Professor Arthur Loveridge". St. Helena News Review, Vol XII, No. 2098, 22 February 1980.
- Loveridge, Arthur (1929). East African Reptiles and Amphibians in the United States National Museum : United States National Museum: Bulletin 151. Washington, District of Columbia: Smithsonian Institution.
- Loveridge, Arthur (1928). "Field Notes on Vertebrates Collected by the Smithsonian-Chrysler East African Expedition of 1926". Proceedings of the United States National Museum 73, Article 17, No 2738.
- Loveridge, Arthur (1956). Forest Safari. London: Lutterworth Press.
- Loveridge, Arthur (1953). I Drank the Zambezi. London: Lutterworth Press.
- Loveridge, Arthur (1930). "A List of the Amphibia of the British Territories in East Africa (Uganda, Kenya Colony, Tanganyika Territory and Zanzibar), Together with Keys for the Diagnosis of the Species". Proceedings of the Zoological Society of London.
- Loveridge, Arthur (1923). "A List of the Lizards of British Territories in East Africa (Uganda, Kenya Colony, Tanganyika Territory, and Zanzibar) With Keys for the diagnosis of the Species". Proceedings of the Zoological Society of London 1923: 841–863.
- Loveridge, Arthur (19??). The Lizards of Tanganyika Territory. Dar es Salaam: Government Printer.
- Loveridge, Arthur (1949). Many Happy Days I've Squandered. London: Robert Hale.
- Loveridge, Arthur (1923). "Notes on East African Birds (chiefly nesting habits and endo-parasites) collected 1920–1923". Proceedings of the Zoological Society of London 1923: 899–921.
- Loveridge, Arthur (1923). "Notes on East African Lizards collected 1920–1923, with the Description of two new Races of Agama lionotus Blgr.". Proceedings of the Zoological Society of London 1923: 935–969.
- Loveridge, Arthur (1923). "Notes on East African Mammals, Collected 1915–1922". Proceedings of the Zoological Society of London
- Loveridge, Arthur (1923). "Notes on East African Mammals, Collected 1920–1923". Proceedings of the Zoological Society of London 1923: 685–739.
- Loveridge, Arthur (1925). "Notes on East African Scorpions and Solifugae, Collected 1916-1923". Proceedings of the Zoological Society of London
- Loveridge, Arthur (1923). "Notes on East African Snakes, collected 1918–1923". Proceedings of the Zoological Society of London 1923: 871–897.
- Loveridge, Arthur (1923). "Notes on East African Tortoises collected 1920–1923, with the description of a New Species of Soft Land Tortoise". Proceedings of the Zoological Society of London 1923: 923–933 + Plates I–II.
- Loveridge, Arthur (1913). "Notes on the Three British Ophidia". Transactions of the Cardiff Naturalists' Society 46:
- Loveridge, Arthur (1925). "On Natrix olivacea (Peters), From Pemba Island, and Other Notes on Reptiles and a Muraenid Fish". Proceedings of the Zoological Society of London.
- Loveridge, Arthur (1930). "Preliminary Description of a New Tree Viper of the Genus Atheris from Tanganyika Territory". Proceedings of the New England Zoological Club 11:
- Loveridge, Arthur (1935). "Rambles in Search of Frogs in Equatoria". Harvard Alumni Bulletin.
- Loveridge, Arthur (1945). Reptiles of the Pacific World (re-edition in 1946 and reimprint in 1957).
- Loveridge, Arthur (1930). "A Scientist's Trip to Eastern Africa". Harvard Alumni Bulletin, 30 October 1930.
- Loveridge, Arthur (1940). "A Serpent-Seeking Safaria in Equatoria". The Scientific Monthly, Vol L & LI, June & July 1940, New York.
- Loveridge, Arthur (19??). The Snakes of Tanganyika Territory. Dar es Salaam: Government Printer.
- Loveridge, Arthur (1951). Tomorrow's a Holiday. London: Robert Hale.
