= Werner Conradie =

South African herpetologist

- Born: July 2, 1982; George, South Africa
- Education: North-West University (South Africa)
- Known for: Taxonomy of southern African amphibians and reptiles
- Scientific career
- Fields: Herpetology

Werner Conradie (born 2 July 1982) is a South African herpetologist whose research focuses primarily on frogs (Anura) of southern Africa.

== Early life and education ==
Conradie is the second eldest of three brothers. He attended school in Willowmore until the age of 13, completed his primary education at Wesbank Primary School in Oudtshoorn, and later moved with his family to Uniondale, where he attended Uniondale High School from 2000 onward.

He continued his tertiary education at Potchefstroom University (now North-West University), where he obtained a Bachelor of Science degree in Zoology and Biochemistry in 2004. In early 2006, he completed a Master’s degree with a thesis titled Seasonal variation in anuran activities in the Vredefort Dome Conservation Area, which focused on compiling an amphibian species list for the UNESCO World Heritage Site Vredefort Dome.

== Career ==
After completing his master’s degree, Conradie worked for one year as a general laboratory and field assistant for the African Amphibian Conservation Research Group. He subsequently became a physics teacher at PJ Oliver High School in Grahamstown and completed a Postgraduate Certificate in Education at Rhodes University in 2008.

In late 2007, Conradie accepted a position as assistant herpetologist at the Port Elizabeth Museum. In May 2011, he succeeded William Roy Branch as curator of the herpetology department, a position in which he oversees and develops the institution’s amphibian and reptile collections.

== Research ==
Conradie’s research interests focus on the taxonomy and systematics of amphibians and reptiles in southern Africa. He has conducted extensive fieldwork throughout South Africa as well as in Angola, Botswana, Lesotho, Malawi, Mozambique, Namibia, Zimbabwe, and Zambia.

He has been involved in the description of numerous new species, including lizards of the genus Pedioplanis, skinks of the genus Acontias, multiple species of the frog genus Nothophryne, Cacosternum thorini, and several species within the genus Hyperolius.

== Conservation work ==
Conradie has participated in several projects under the EDGE of Existence Programme of the Zoological Society of London. His work has included conservation assessments of the Cape ghost frog (Heleophryne rosei) and Hewitt’s ghost frog (Heleophryne hewitti), population and habitat surveys, chytrid fungus monitoring, development of conservation action plans, and public awareness initiatives related to ghost frog conservation.

== Selected publications ==
A complete bibliography of Conradie’s scientific publications is maintained by Bayworld.
