= Andreas Schmitz =

German herpetologist (born 1971)

- Born: Andreas Robert Wilfried Schmitz; March 16, 1971 (age 55)
- Education: University of Bonn
- Known for: Research on African and Southeast Asian herpetofauna; Studies on the Cameroon line
- Scientific career
- Fields: Herpetology
- Workplaces: Zoological Research Museum Alexander Koenig; Natural History Museum of Geneva
- Thesis: Taxonomic and phylogenetic studies on scincid lizards (Reptilia: Scincidae) (2003)
- Doctoral advisor: Wolfgang Böhme
- Author abbrev. (zoology): Schmitz

Andreas Robert Wilfried Schmitz (born March 16, 1971) is a German herpetologist.

== Career ==
In 1995, Schmitz became a staff member at the Zoological Research Museum Alexander Koenig (ZFMK) in Bonn, Germany. In 1998, he completed his diploma thesis on the systematics and zoogeography of the herpetofauna of a montane rainforest region in Cameroon under the supervision of Wolfgang Böhme at the University of Bonn. From 1998 to 1999, he worked as a research assistant on a paleontological project at the university's Institute of Paleontology. In 2003, Schmitz earned his doctorate (Dr. rer. nat.) with the dissertation titled Taxonomic and phylogenetic studies on scincid lizards (Reptilia: Scincidae), also under Böhme’s supervision. His research involved several field expeditions to tropical Africa and Indonesia. Since 2003, he has been head of research in the herpetology department at the Natural History Museum of Geneva (MHNG), Switzerland. Schmitz's research focuses on the systematics, taxonomy, phylogenetics, and conservation of a wide range of amphibian and reptile groups, particularly in Africa and Southeast Asia. One of his main areas of interest is the Cameroon line, a volcanic mountain chain in western Cameroon with high levels of endemism, where species have been isolated on individual peaks over millions of years. Another key focus of his work is West Africa.

== Eponyms ==
The species Acontias schmitzi and Trapelus schmitzi are named in his honor.

== Taxa described by Schmitz ==
- Afroedura gorongosa
- Agama lebretoni
- Ameerega boehmei
- Ameerega yungicola
- Boaedon bocagei
- Boaedon branchi
- Boaedon fradei
- Cacosternum aggestum
- Cacosternum australis
- Cacosternum kinangopensis
- Cacosternum nanogularum
- Cacosternum rhythmum
- Cardioglossa alsco
- Cardioglossa occidentalis
- Cophoscincopus greeri
- Cyrtodactylus pageli
- Cyrtodactylus roesleri
- Echinosaura brachycephala
- Gehyra georgpotthasti
- Goniurosaurus catbaensis
- Hyperolius dintelmanni
- Lacertaspis chriswildi
- Leptosiaphos koutoui
- Lygosoma boehmei
- Mesalina saudiarabica
- Mochlus hinkeli
- Naja peroescobari
- Odontobatrachus arndti
- Odontobatrachus fouta
- Odontobatrachus smithi
- Odontobatrachus ziama
- Petropedetes euskircheni
- Petropedetes juliawurstnerae
- Petropedetes vulpiae
- Phrynobatrachus arcanus
- Phrynobatrachus mbabo
- Pristimantis lucidosignatus
- Pristimantis onorei
- Sclerophrys channingi
- Sphenomorphus tonkinensis
- Trachylepis makolowodei
- Trapelus boehmei
- Tropidophorus boehmei
- Uromastyx shobraki
- Uromastyx yemenensis
- Varanus bennetti
- Varanus colei
- Varanus lirungensis
- Varanus rainerguentheri
- Werneria iboundji
- Werneria submontana
