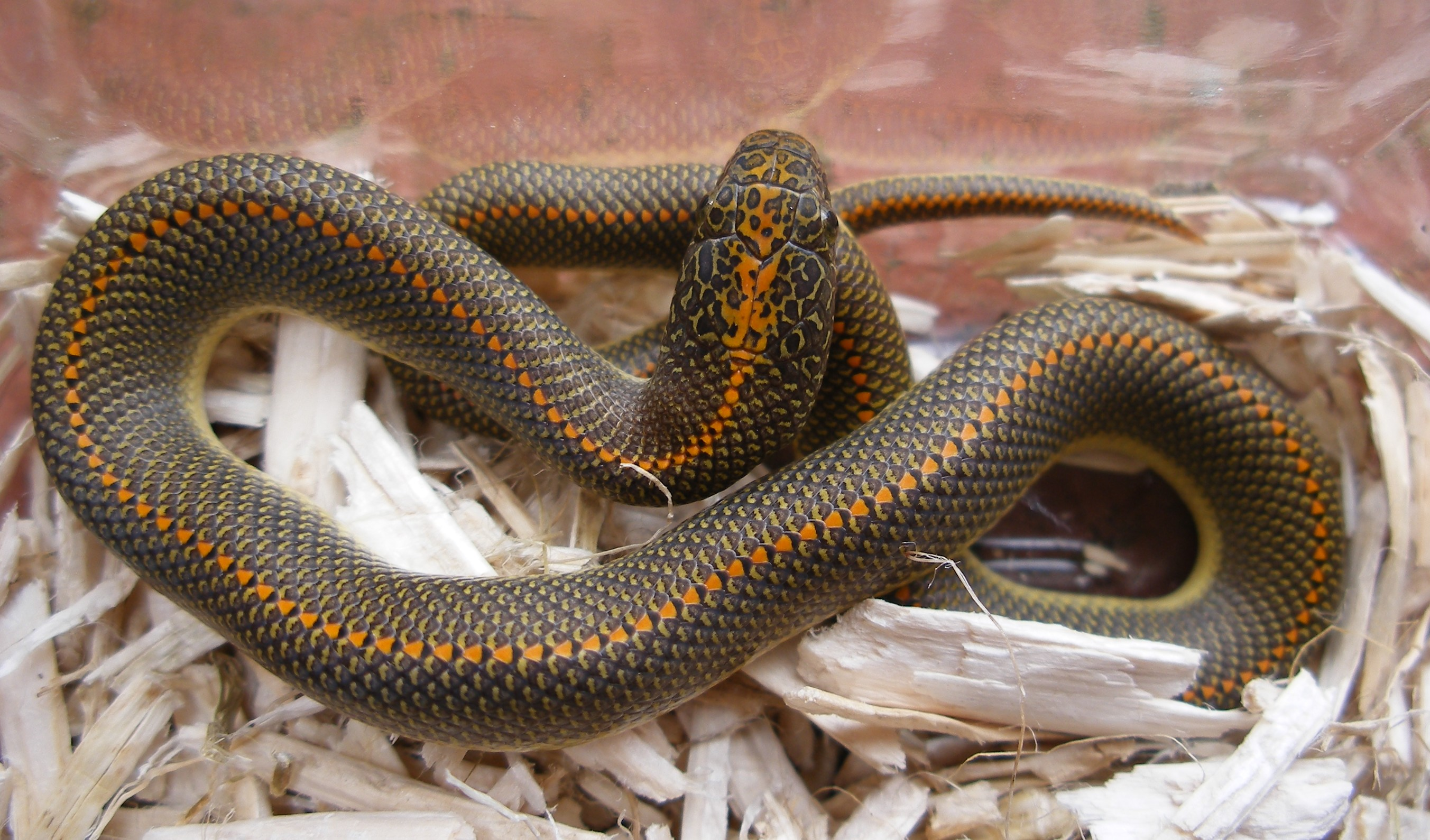
- Lamprophis aurora

Scientific classification
- Domain: Eukaryota
- Kingdom: Animalia
- Phylum: Chordata
- Class: Reptilia
- Order: Squamata
- Suborder: Serpentes
- Family: Colubridae
- Subfamily: Boodontinae; Cope, 1893

Genera
- 2, see text

= Boodontinae =

Subfamily of snakes

Boodontinae is a subfamily of colubrid snakes.

== Genera ==
It contains 22 genera.

- Boaedon
- Bothrolycus
- Bothrophthalmus
- Buhoma
- Chamaelycus
- Dendrolycus
- Dipsina
- Dromophis
- Duberria
- Gonionotophis
- Grayia
- Hormonotus
- Lamprophis
- Lycodonomorphus
- Lycophidion
- Macroprotodon
- Mehelya
- Montaspis
- Pseudaspis
- Pseudoboodon
- Pythonodipsas
- Scaphiophis
