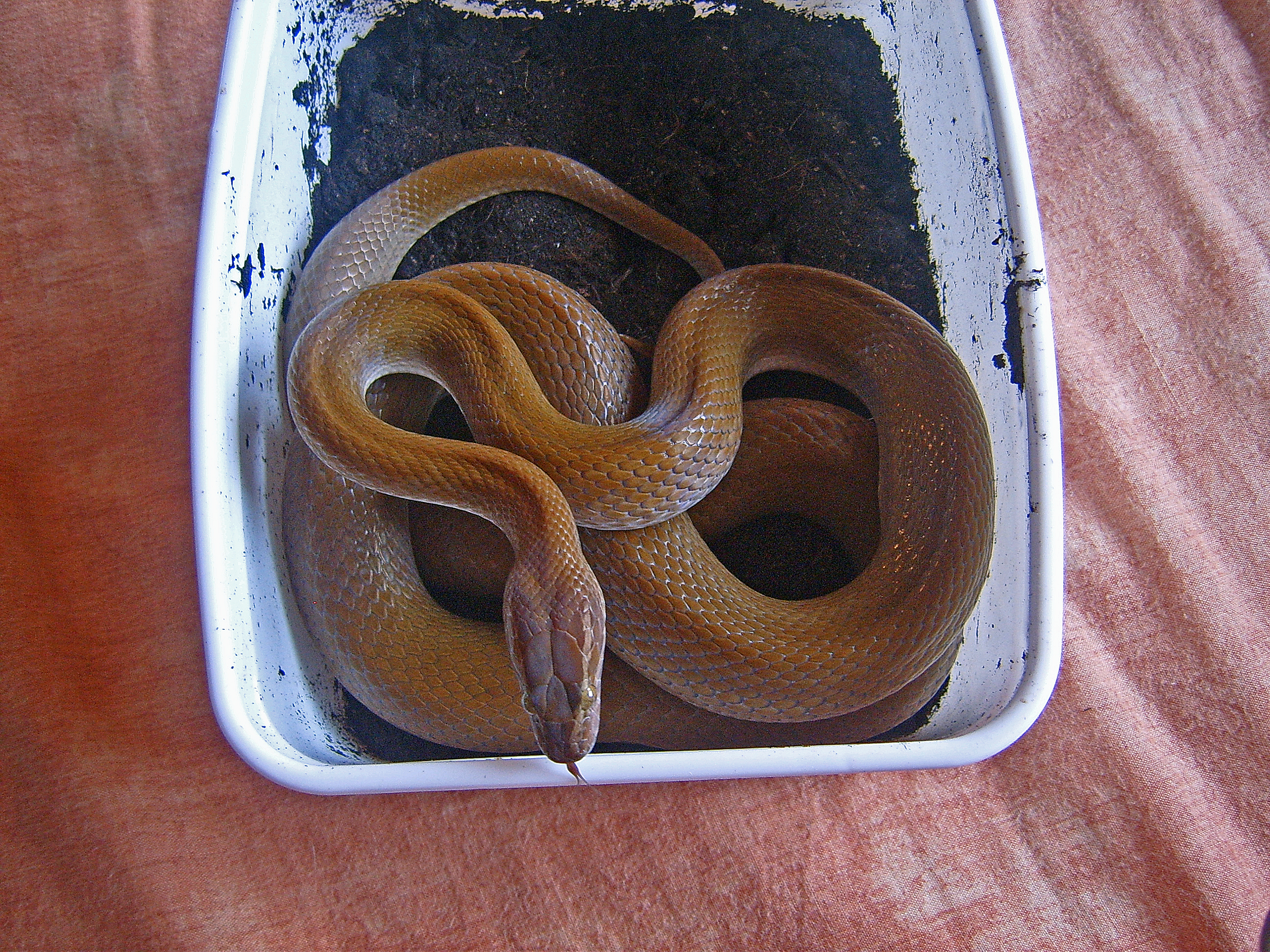
- Boaedon capensis

Scientific classification
- Kingdom: Animalia
- Phylum: Chordata
- Class: Reptilia
- Order: Squamata
- Suborder: Serpentes
- Family: Lamprophiidae
- Subfamily: Lamprophiinae; Fitzinger, 1843

Genera
- see text

= Lamprophiinae =

Subfamily of snakes

Lamprophiinae is a subfamily of lamprophiid snakes, a large group of mostly African snakes, most of which were formerly classified as colubrids but which we now know are actually more closely related to elapids.

Lamprophiine snakes are small to medium-sized snakes, several of which use constriction to subdue their prey. In general we know little about their ecology in the wild.

The best-known lamprophiines are probably the genera Boaedon and Lamprophis, commonly known as "house snakes". Several species are popular in the pet trade.

Chamaelycus and Dendrolycus are the most poorly known genera.

== Genera ==
There are currently 78 species in 15 genera placed in Lamprophiinae.

- Alopecion Duméril, 1853 - spotted house snake
- Boaedon A.M.C. Duméril, Bibron & A.H.A. Duméril, 1854 (brown house snakes)
- Bofa Tiutenko, Koch, Pabijan & Zinenko, 2022 (Ethiopian forest snakes)
- Bothrolycus Günther, 1874 (Günther's black snake)
- Bothrophthalmus W. Peters, 1863 (red-black striped snakes)
- Chamaelycus Boulenger, 1919 (African banded snakes)
- Dendrolycus Laurent, 1956 (Cameroon rainforest snakes)
- Elaiophis Tiutenko, Maliuk & Koch, 2025 (African olive snakes)
- Gonionotophis Boulenger, 1893 (African File Snakes; including the former genus Mehelya)
- Gracililima Broadley, Tolley, Conradie, Wishart, Trape, Burger, Kusamba, Zassi-Boulou & Greenbaum, 2018 (black file snake)
- Hormonotus Hallowell, 1857 (yellow forest snake)
- Inyoka Kelly, Branch, Broadley, Barker & Villet, 2011 (Swazi rock snake)
- Lamprophis Fitzinger, 1843 (dwarf house snakes)
- Limaformosa Broadley, Tolley, Conradie, Wishart, Trape, Burger, Kusamba, Zassi-Boulou, & Greenbaum, 2018(African file snakes; including the former genus Mehelya)
- Lycodonomorphus Fitzinger, 1843 (African water snakes)
- Lycophidion Fitzinger, 1843 (African wolf snakes)
- Pseudoboodon Peracca, 1897 (Ethiopian mountain snakes)
