= Banded snake =

Banded snake may refer to:

- Snakes of the genus Chamaelycus in the family Colubridae
- Snakes of the genus Simoselaps in the family Elapidae
- De Vis's banded snake (Denisonia devisi)
- Black-banded trinket snake (Oreocryptophis porphyracea)
- Banded water snake (Nerodia fasciata)
- Brown-banded water snake (Helicops angulatus)
- Banded cat-eyed snake (Leptodeira annulata)
- Many-banded tree snake (Boiga multifasciata)
- White-banded wolf snake (Dinodon septentrionalis)
- Banded kukuri snake (Oligodon arnensis)
- Pseudoboodon lemniscatus
