= Mehelya =

Scientific classification
- Kingdom: Animalia
- Phylum: Chordata
- Class: Reptilia
- Order: Squamata
- Suborder: Serpentes
- Family: Lamprophiidae
- Genus: Mehelya; Csíki, 1903

Species
- Five species, see article.

Genus of snakes

Mehelya is a genus name of snakes native to Africa. Some species formerly assigned to the genus Mehelya are now found in the genera Gonionotophis, Gracililima, or Limaformosa. They are collectively called file snakes due to their unusually small but strongly keeled scales, giving them the impression of a file. They are not venomous.

== Etymology ==
The generic name, Mehelya, is in honor of Hungarian zoologist Lajos Méhelÿ. The specific name, laurenti, is in honor of Belgian herpetologist Raymond Ferdinand Laurent.

== Species ==
There are five species within the genus Mehelya.

- Mehelya egbensis Dunger, 1966 – Dunger's file snake
- Mehelya gabouensis J.-F. Trape & Mané, 2005 – Gabou file snake
- Mehelya laurenti de Witte, 1959 – file snake
- Mehelya poensis (A. Smith, 1849) – forest file snake, western forest file snake
- Mehelya stenopthalmus (Mocquard, 1887) – small-eyed file snake

== Geographic range ==
Mehelya snakes are found throughout much of sub-Saharan Africa, from the Cape of South Africa through Zimbabwe and Botswana to the Democratic Republic of the Congo and further.

== Description ==
Mehelya are not large snakes, growing to around 3–4 feet (0.91–1.22 m). Their dorsal scales are unique: large patches of bare skin are seen, and scales are separated by large gaps. These scales are strongly keeled, giving the snake the feel of a file; hence the common name. Their body shape is triangular in cross section, which has been noted amongst other "cannibalistic" snakes, and may also provide some sort of benefit for them within their burrowing lifestyle.

== Habitat ==
File snakes generally occupy more humid regions, but are also found in hotter desert areas.

== Behaviour ==
File snakes are, by nature, burrowers. They will occupy old, abandoned burrows of rodents where they shelter from the heat in the relative coolness underground. They are also adept at burrowing for themselves, their flattened head aiding them to push their way through the earth and leaf litter. This genus is nocturnal, becoming active at night to hunt other reptiles.

== Diet ==
The genus Mehelya feeds mainly on snakes and small lizards, such as geckos. Like many genera that feed solely on snakes, it has developed a triangular body shape as opposed to the plump, rounded body of other snakes.
