= Ethiopian house snake =

There are two species of snake named Ethiopian house snake:

- Abyssinian house snake, Pseudoboodon abyssinicus
- Bofa erlangeri
