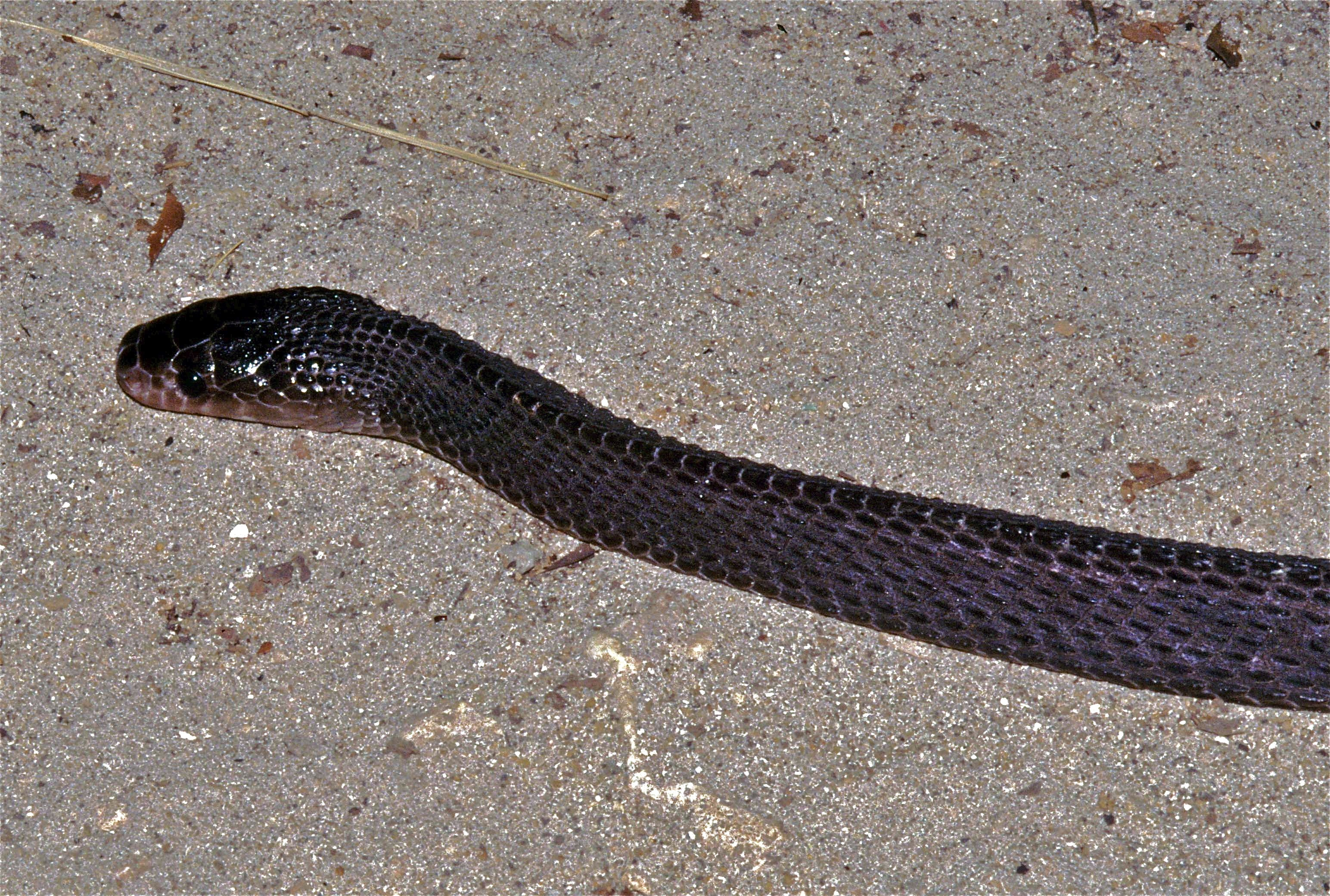

Conservation status
- Least Concern (IUCN 3.1)

Scientific classification
- Kingdom: Animalia
- Phylum: Chordata
- Class: Reptilia
- Order: Squamata
- Suborder: Serpentes
- Family: Lamprophiidae
- Genus: Limaformosa
- Species: L. capensis

Binomial name
- Limaformosa capensis (A. Smith, 1847)

Synonyms
- Heterolepis capensis A. Smith, 1847; Simocephalus capensis — Boulenger, 1893; Mehelya capensis — Rasmussen, 1981; Gonionotophis capensis — Kelly et al., 2011; Limaformosa capensis — Broadley et al., 2018

= Cape file snake =

Species of snake

The Cape file snake (Limaformosa capensis) is a species of medium-sized, non-venomous snake endemic to Africa, belonging to the family Lamprophiidae.

== Geographic range ==
L. capensis is found from Natal northwards through the former Transvaal and Zimbabwe, and westwards to the Caprivi Strip and Namibia, thence northwards to Cameroon and Somalia.

== Description ==
L. capensis is a medium to large snake. With an average total length (including tail) of about 120 centimetres (3 ft 11 in), specimens of 165 cm (5 ft 5 in) total length have been recorded. It has a very flat head, and its body is strikingly triangular in cross-section.

The Cape file snake's dorsal scales are strongly keeled with extensive pink-purple bare skin between the scales. Its colour is mostly grey to grey-brown, but occasionally dark olive to purple-brown. The prominent vertebral stripe is white to yellow, while the belly is ivory white to cream.

The dorsal scales, in addition to the strong primary keel, have secondary keels and tubercles, but no apical pits. The dorsal scales are arranged in 15 rows at midbody (in 17 rows on the neck). The ventrals number 203-241. The anal plate is undivided. The subcaudals number 45-61, and are divided (in two rows).

== Habitat ==
The preferred natural habitats of L. capensis are shrubland, savanna, and coastal forest, at altitudes from sea level to 1,500 m (4,900 ft).

== Diet ==
Though it is not venomous, the Cape file snake is a highly successful predator of other snakes, easily following a scent trail and apparently immune to all venom. It also preys on small vertebrates.

== Defense ==
Rarely attempting to bite when captured, L. capensis may defecate in self-defence.

== Reproduction ==
L. capensis is oviparous. In the summer, an adult female may lay one or two clutches of eggs. Clutch size varies from 5-13. The eggs are large, 47–55 mm (about 2 inches) long, by 20–31 mm (about 1 inch) wide. Each hatchling is 39–42 cm (about 16 inches) in total length (including tail).
