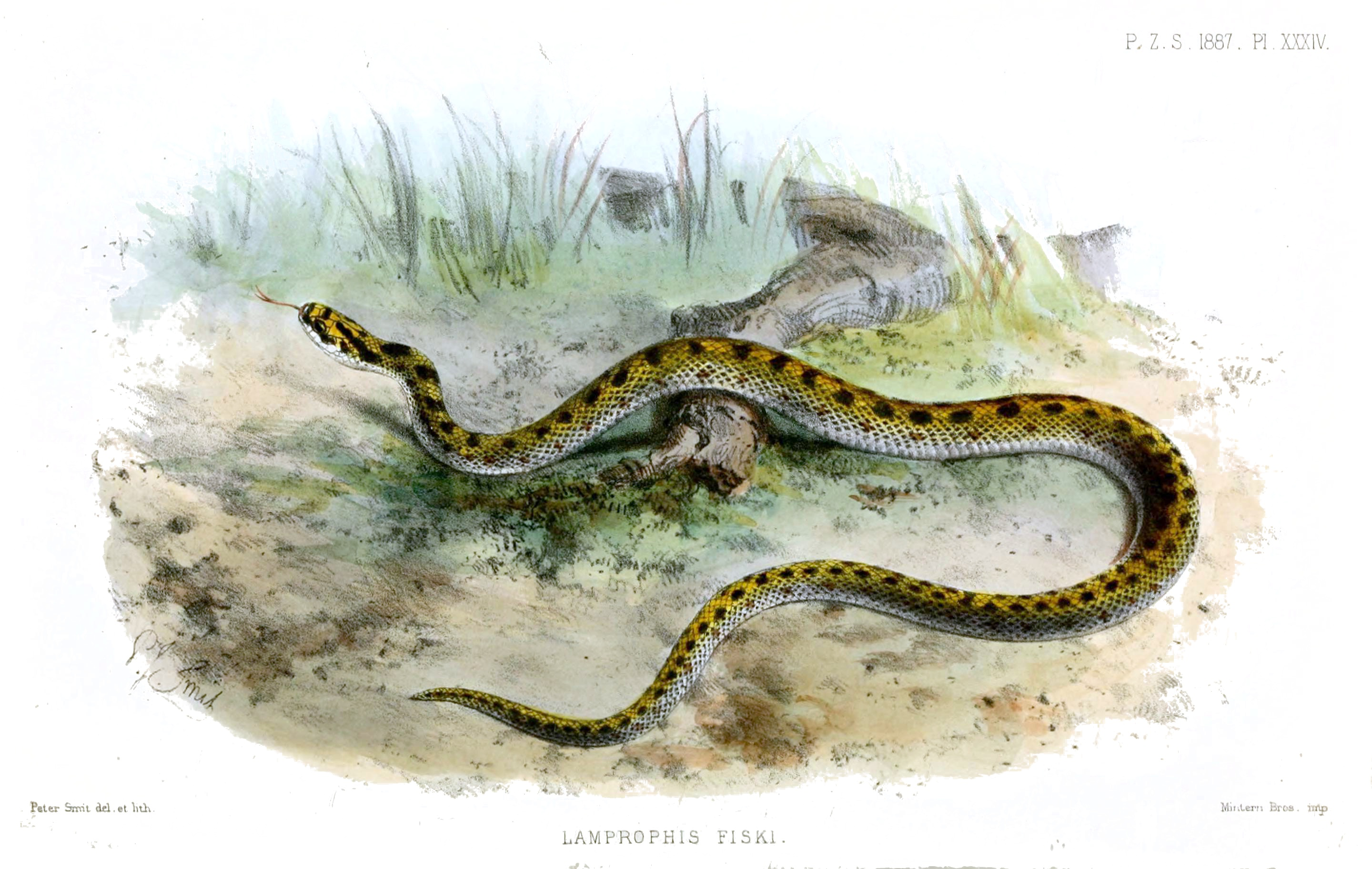

Conservation status
- Least Concern (IUCN 3.1)

Scientific classification
- Kingdom: Animalia
- Phylum: Chordata
- Class: Reptilia
- Order: Squamata
- Suborder: Serpentes
- Family: Lamprophiidae
- Genus: Lamprophis
- Species: L. fiskii

Binomial name
- Lamprophis fiskii Boulenger, 1887

= Fisk's house snake =

Species of snake

Fisk's house snake (Lamprophis fiskii) is a species of snake in the family Lamprophiidae. It is endemic to South Africa.
