= Inyoka =

Conservation status
- Least Concern (IUCN 3.1)

Scientific classification
- Kingdom: Animalia
- Phylum: Chordata
- Class: Reptilia
- Order: Squamata
- Suborder: Serpentes
- Family: Lamprophiidae
- Subfamily: Lamprophiinae
- Genus: Inyoka; Branch & Kelly in Kelly et al., 2011
- Species: I. swazicus

Binomial name
- Inyoka swazicus (Schaefer, 1970)

Synonyms
- Lamprophis swazicus Schaefer, 1970

Genus of snakes

Inyoka is a monotypic genus of southern African snakes. The word "inyoka" means "snake" in Zulu, Xhosa, Swahili, Shona and other African languages. These snakes were previously grouped in the genus Lamprophis but were found to be closer related to Hormonotus; a substantial genetic divergence between them and a 1900 km gap between their geographic ranges meant a new genus was erected for Lamprophis swazicus, the sole species of the new genus.

== Species ==
Inyoka swazicus is commonly known as the Swazi rock snake or Swaziland house snake. It is found in the eastern South Africa and in Eswatini. It inhabits rocky outcrops in grassland and savanna at altitudes of 1,400–1,900 m (4,600–6,200 ft) asl. Although listed as a "Lower Risk/Near Threatened" species by the International Union for Conservation of Nature (IUCN), it is only considered of "Least Concern" in the South African Conservation Assessment of Reptiles in view of its relatively wide distribution and low level of anthropogenic disturbance in its habitat.

Inyoka swazicus can grow to a maximum total length of 90 cm (35 in). The head is small, dorso-ventrally flattened, and broader than neck and distinct from it. Eyes are large, protruding, and with vertically elliptical pupil. They are non-venomous.
