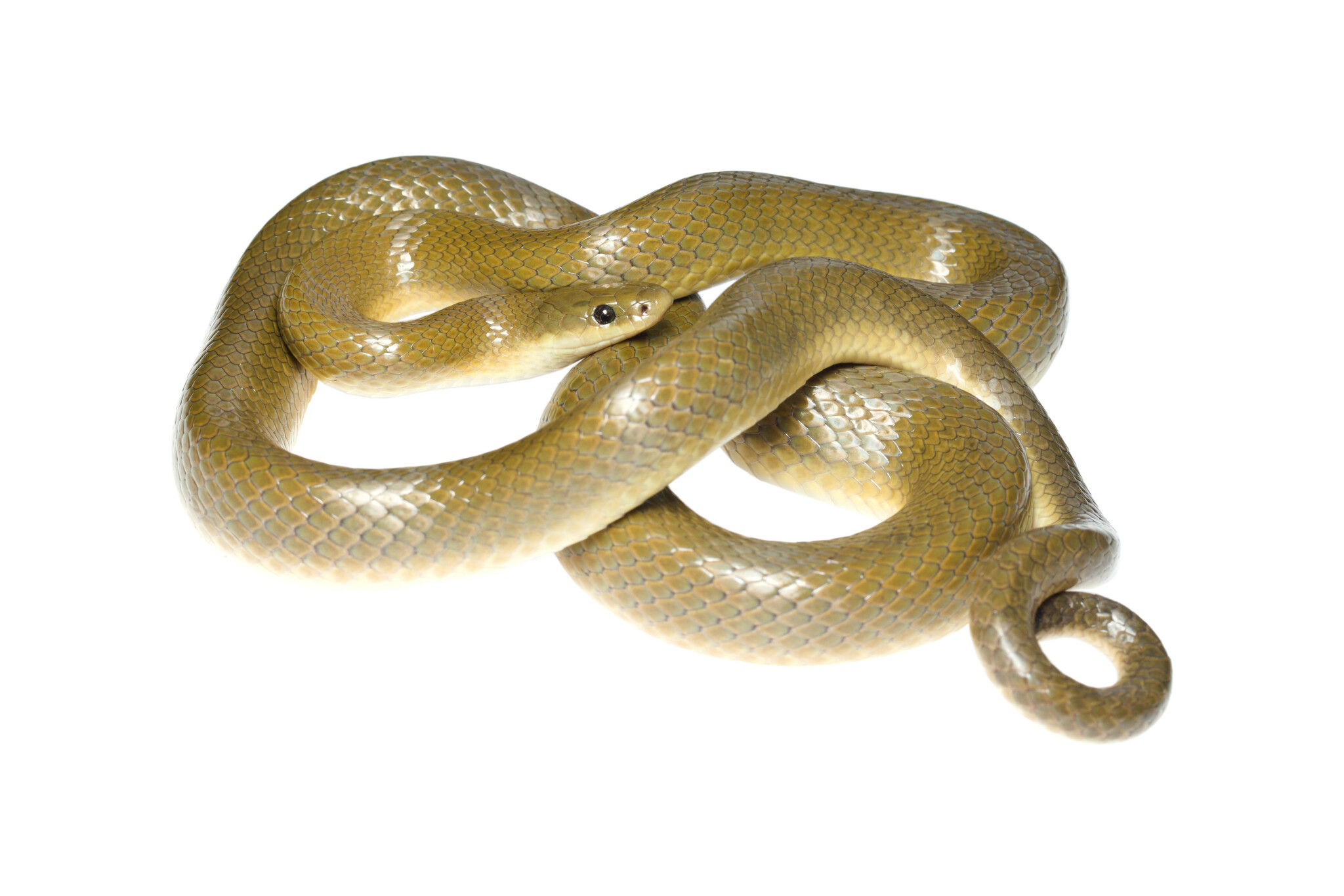

Conservation status
- Least Concern (IUCN 3.1)

Scientific classification
- Kingdom: Animalia
- Phylum: Chordata
- Class: Reptilia
- Order: Squamata
- Suborder: Serpentes
- Family: Lamprophiidae
- Genus: Lamprophis
- Species: L. fuscus

Binomial name
- Lamprophis fuscus Boulenger, 1893

= Yellow-bellied house snake =

Species of snake

The yellow-bellied house snake (Lamprophis fuscus) is a species of snake in the family Lamprophiidae . It is endemic to South Africa.
