= Pseudoboodon gascae =

Conservation status
- Least Concern (IUCN 3.1)

Scientific classification
- Kingdom: Animalia
- Phylum: Chordata
- Class: Reptilia
- Order: Squamata
- Suborder: Serpentes
- Family: Lamprophiidae
- Genus: Pseudoboodon
- Species: P. gascae

Binomial name
- Pseudoboodon gascae Peracca, 1897

Species of snake

Pseudoboodon gascae, or Gascaʻs Ethiopian snake, is a species of snake in the family Lamprophiidae. It is native to Ethiopia and Eritrea.

== Ecology ==
The snake lives at an altitude of 1,500–2,450 m (4,920–8,040 ft). In 2014 it was classified in the IUCN Red List as LC (Least Concern).
