= Carabus biroi =

Scientific classification
- Kingdom: Animalia
- Phylum: Arthropoda
- Class: Insecta
- Order: Coleoptera
- Suborder: Adephaga
- Family: Carabidae
- Genus: Carabus
- Species: C. biroi

Binomial name
- Carabus biroi Csiki, 1927

Species of beetle

Carabus biroi is a species of ground beetle in the large genus Carabus that is endemic in Turkey.
