= Böhme's Ethiopian snake =

Conservation status
- Least Concern (IUCN 3.1)

Scientific classification
- Kingdom: Animalia
- Phylum: Chordata
- Class: Reptilia
- Order: Squamata
- Suborder: Serpentes
- Family: Lamprophiidae
- Genus: Pseudoboodon
- Species: P. boehmei

Binomial name
- Pseudoboodon boehmei Rasmussen & Largen, 1991

Species of snake

Böhme's Ethiopian snake (Pseudoboodon boehmei) is a species of snake in the family Lamprophiidae. It is endemic to Ethiopia.

== Ecology ==
In 2014 it was classified in the IUCN Red List as LC (Least Concern).
