= Clivina sloanei =

Scientific classification
- Kingdom: Animalia
- Phylum: Arthropoda
- Class: Insecta
- Order: Coleoptera
- Suborder: Adephaga
- Family: Carabidae
- Genus: Clivina
- Species: C. sloanei

Binomial name
- Clivina sloanei Csíki, 1927

Species of beetle

Clivina sloanei is a species of ground beetle in the subfamily Scaritinae. It was described by Ernő Csíki in 1927.
