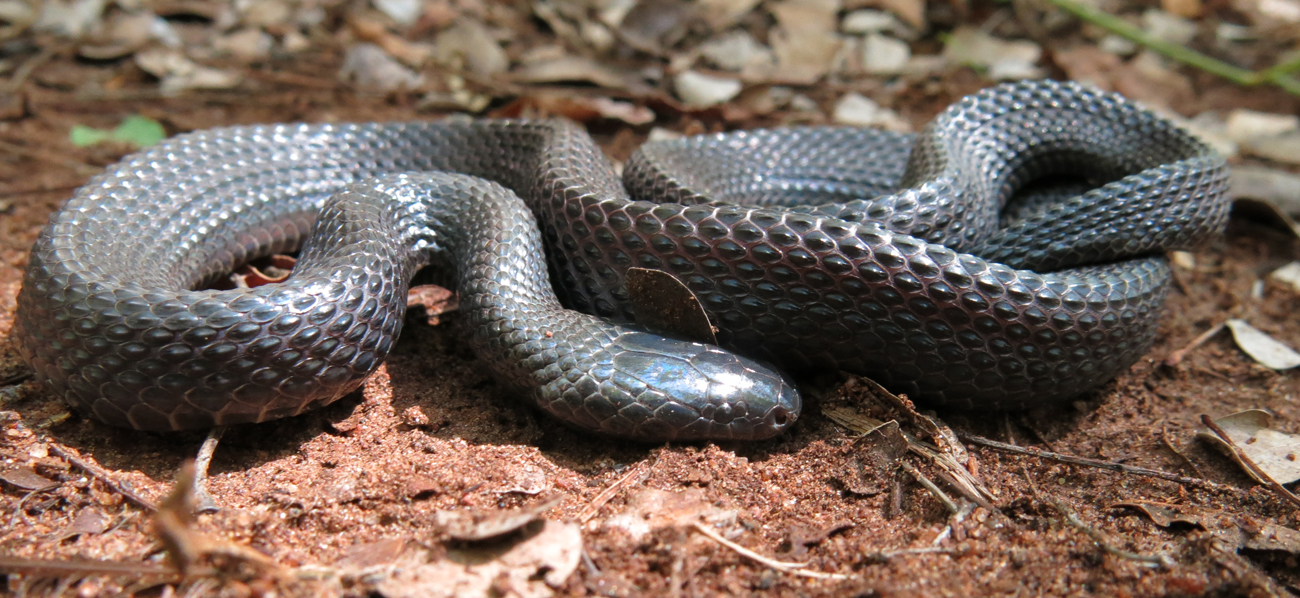

Conservation status
- Least Concern (IUCN 3.1)

Scientific classification
- Kingdom: Animalia
- Phylum: Chordata
- Class: Reptilia
- Order: Squamata
- Suborder: Serpentes
- Family: Lamprophiidae
- Genus: Gracililima; Broadley, Tolley, Conradie, Wishart, J.-F. Trape, Burger, Kusamba, Zassi-Boulou & Greenbaum, 2018
- Species: G. nyassae

Binomial name
- Gracililima nyassae (Günther, 1888)

Synonyms
- Simocephalus nyassae Günther, 1888; Gonionotophis degrijsi F. Werner, 1906; Mehelya nyassae — Broadley, 1959; Gonionotophis nyassae — Kelly et al., 2011; Gracililima nyassae — Broadley et al., 2018

= Black file snake =

Species of snake

The black file snake (Gracililima nyassae), also known commonly as the dwarf file snake or the Nyassa file snake, is a species of snake in the subfamily Lamprophiinae of the family Lamprophiidae. The species is endemic to Africa.

== Taxonomy ==
Gracililima nyassae is the only species in the genus Gracililima. The species was previously placed in the genera Gonionotophis, Mehelya, and Simocephalus.

== Etymology ==
The generic name, Gracililima is from Latin gracili- meaning "slender" + lima meaning "file". The specific name, nyassae, refers to the type locality, "Lake Nyassa" (= Lake Malawi).

== Geographic range ==
G. nyassae is found in Botswana, Burundi, Democratic Republic of the Congo, Eswatini, Kenya, Malawi, Mozambique, Namibia, Rwanda, Somalia, South Africa, Tanzania, Zambia, and Zimbabwe.

== Description ==
G. nyassae is a small snake. The female may attain a snout-to-vent length (SVL) of 52 cm (20 in). The male is shorter, around 44 cm (17 in) SVL. Dorsally it is dark brown or purplish brown, with pink skin showing between the scales. Unlike the Common File snake, this snake lacks the light dorsal stripe but has the characteristic triangular body, Ventrally it is black to dark olive (uniform phase), or cream-olive to white (bicolored phase).

== Diet ==
G. nyassae preys on skinks and other lizards.

== Reproduction ==
The black file snake is oviparous. The female may lay as many as six eggs.
