= Pseudoboodon sandfordorum =

Conservation status
- Data Deficient (IUCN 3.1)

Scientific classification
- Kingdom: Animalia
- Phylum: Chordata
- Class: Reptilia
- Order: Squamata
- Suborder: Serpentes
- Family: Lamprophiidae
- Genus: Pseudoboodon
- Species: P. sandfordorum

Binomial name
- Pseudoboodon sandfordorum Spawls, 2004

Species of snake

Pseudoboodon sandfordorum, also known as Sandford's Ethiopian mountain snake and Sandford's Ethiopian snake, is a species of snake in the family Lamprophiidae. It was first described in 2004 by Stephen Spawls. Its holotype was collected in late 1997 in Ethiopia.

== Ecology ==
In 2014, it was classified in IUCN Red List as DD (data deficient).
