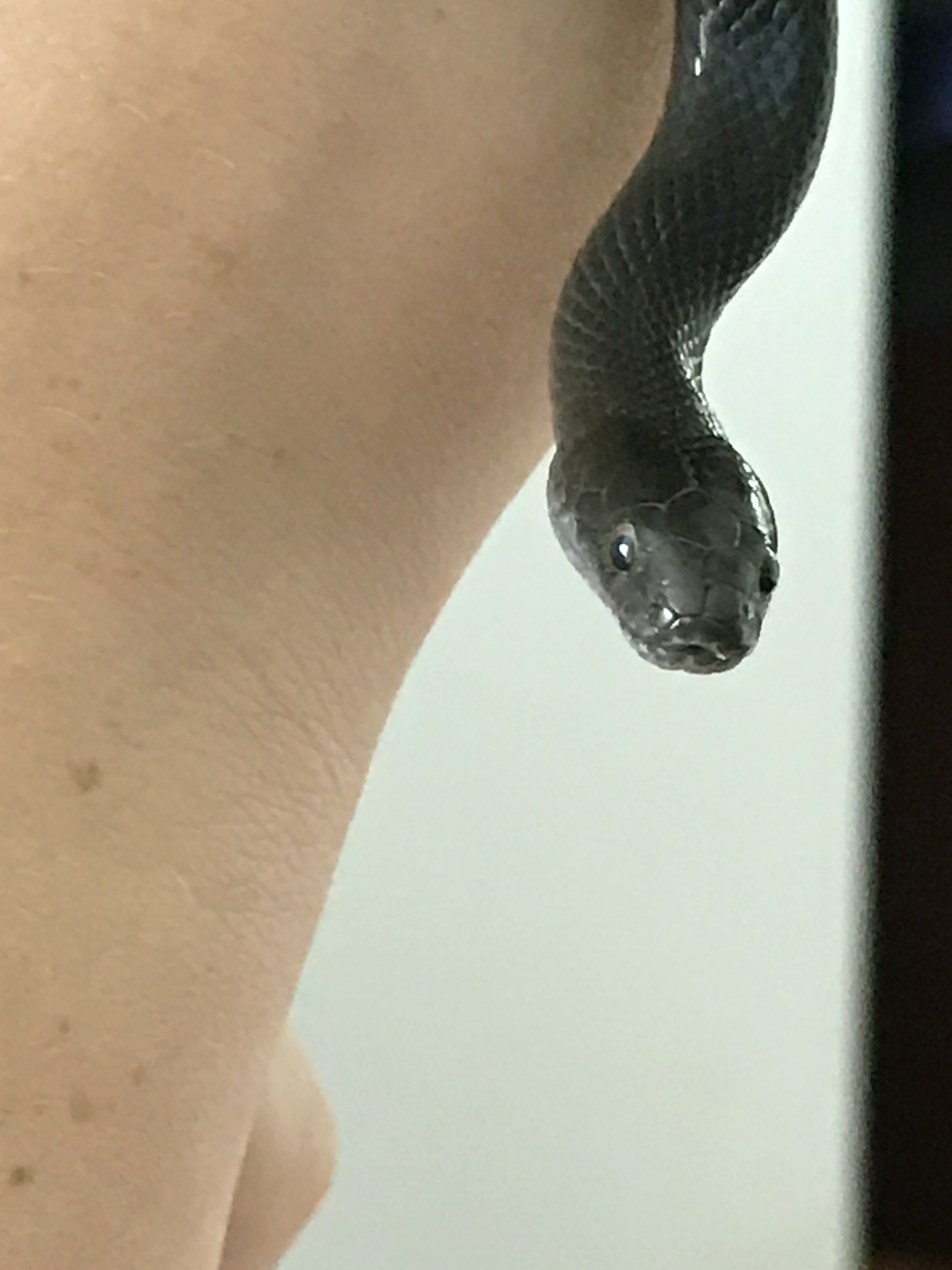

Conservation status
- Least Concern (IUCN 3.1)

Scientific classification
- Kingdom: Animalia
- Phylum: Chordata
- Class: Reptilia
- Order: Squamata
- Suborder: Serpentes
- Family: Lamprophiidae
- Genus: Elaiophis; Tiutenko, Maliuk, Koch, 2025
- Species: E. inornatus

Binomial name
- Elaiophis inornatus (Duméril, Bibron & Duméril, 1854)

Synonyms
- Lamprophis inornatus Duméril, Bibron & Duméril, 1854; Boodon infernalis Günther, 1858 (fide Rasmussen, 1992); Pachyophis temporalis Werner, 1924 (fide Smith, 1928); Lycodonomorphus inornatus — Kelly et al., 2011; Lycodonomorphus inornatus — Wallach et al., 2014; Elaiophis inornatus — Tiutenko et al., 2025

= Elaiophis inornatus =

Species of snake

Elaiophis inornatus, commonly known as the olive house snake, the black house snake, and the olive ground snake, is a species of nonvenomous snake in the family Lamprophiidae. The species is endemic to southern Africa. It is a nocturnal snake with terrestrial habits.

== Description ==
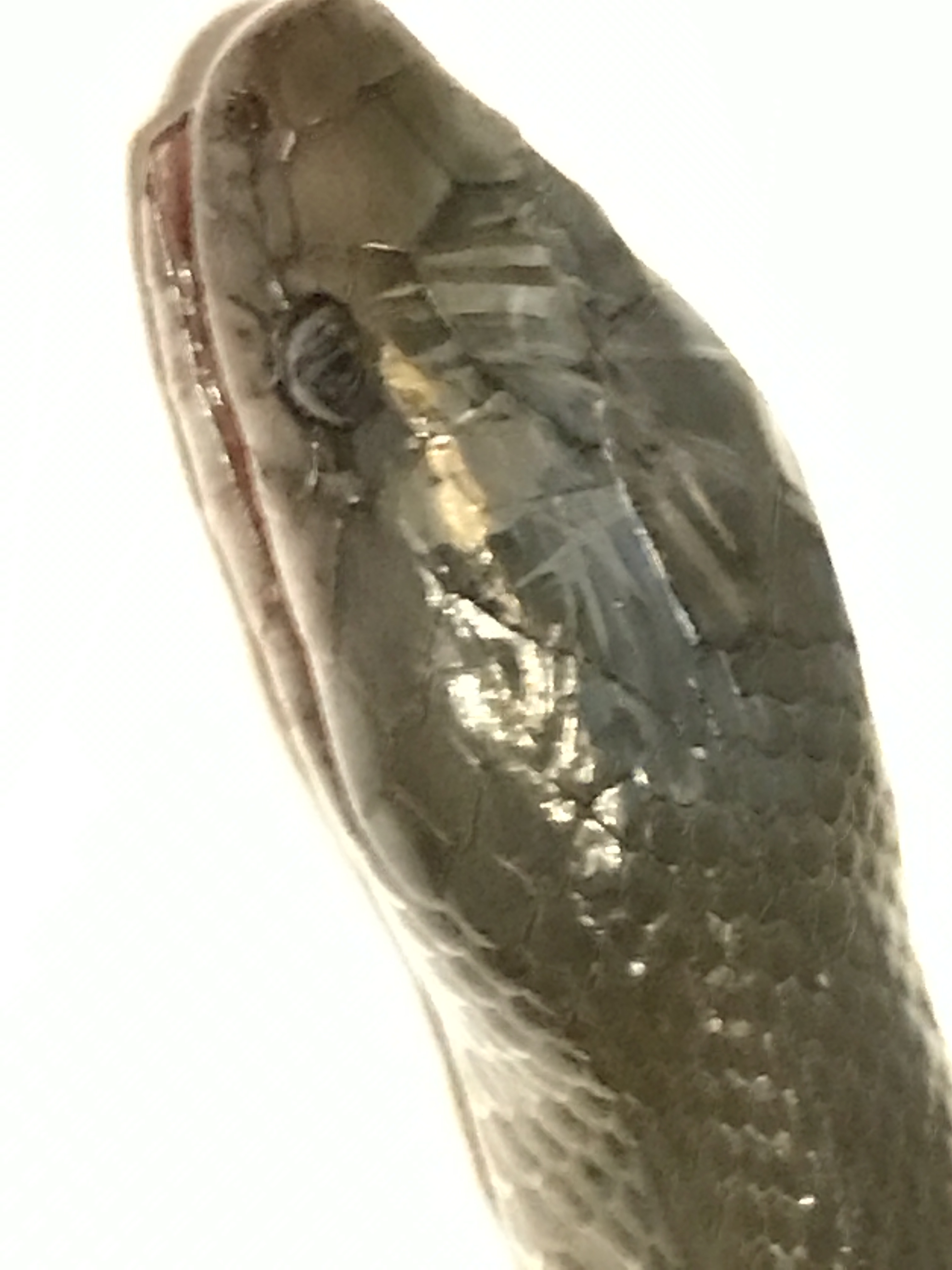

Elaiophis inornatus commonly reaches a total length (including tail) of 45–75 cm (18–30 in), with a recorded maximum of 130 cm (51 in). Individuals may be dark olive to black, or uniformly light brown to olive grey-green, with a uniform or slightly lighter belly, especially the chin, throat and neck.

== Distribution and habitat ==
The olive house snake occurs in South Africa and Eswatini, where it is found along the eastern coastal belt from the southwestern Cape through East London to the Transkei, and extending through low-veld regions of the KwaZulu-Natal, the Mpumalanga escarpment and the Limpopo Province. It inhabits coastal bushveld, fynbos and grassveld where sufficient moisture is present, and may occur close to human habitations.

Reports of occurrence from Namibia remain unconfirmed.

== Ecology ==
Elaiophis inornatus is nocturnal and generally terrestrial, hunting on the ground. It is generally slow moving and docile but may bite when molested. Females lay 5–15 eggs. The olive house snake feeds on lizards, small rodents and other snakes. It is preyed on by various types of raptors, including the snake eagle and the secretary bird, as well as by other snakes.
