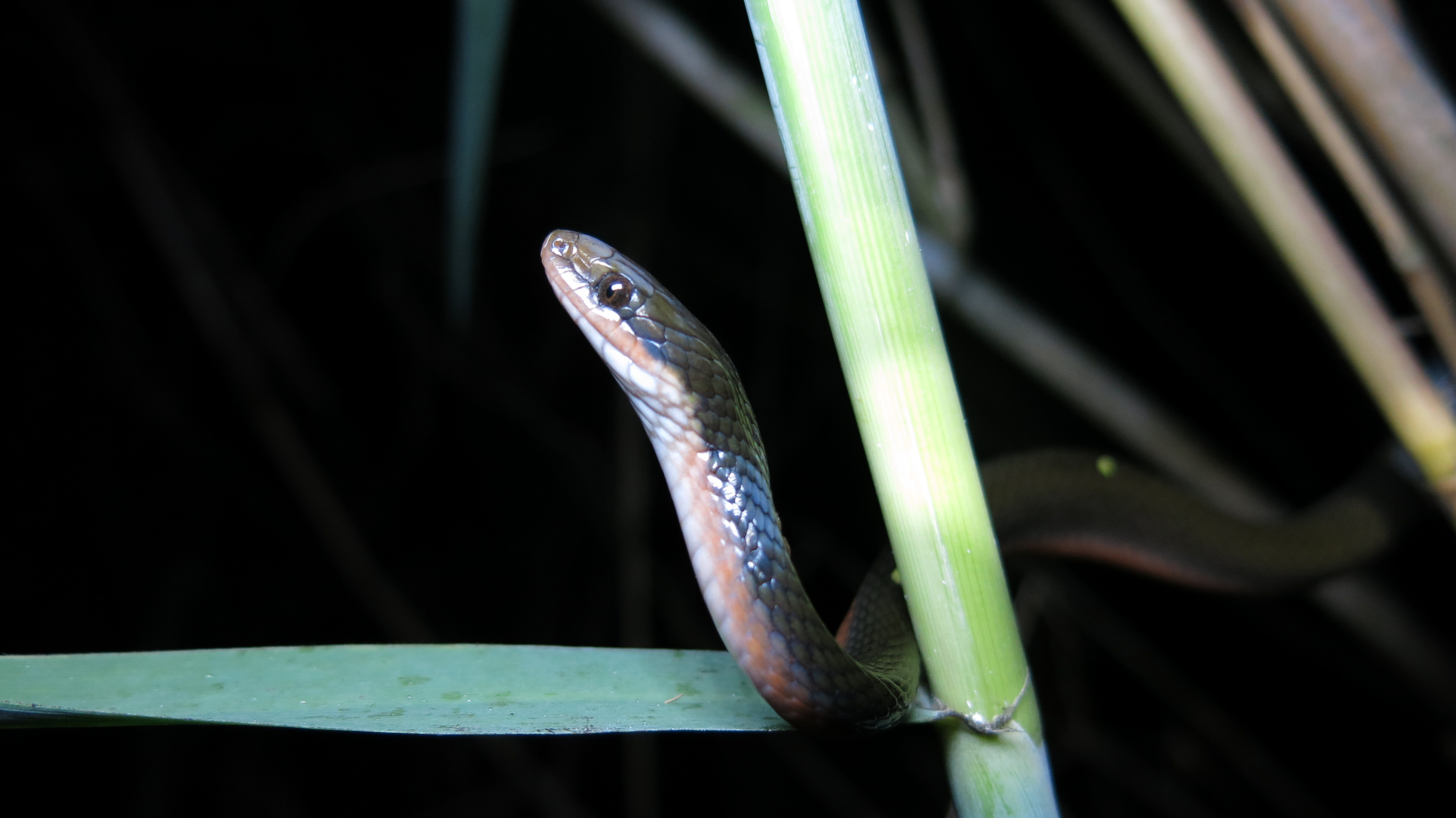
- Brown watersnake, Lycodonomorphus rufulus.
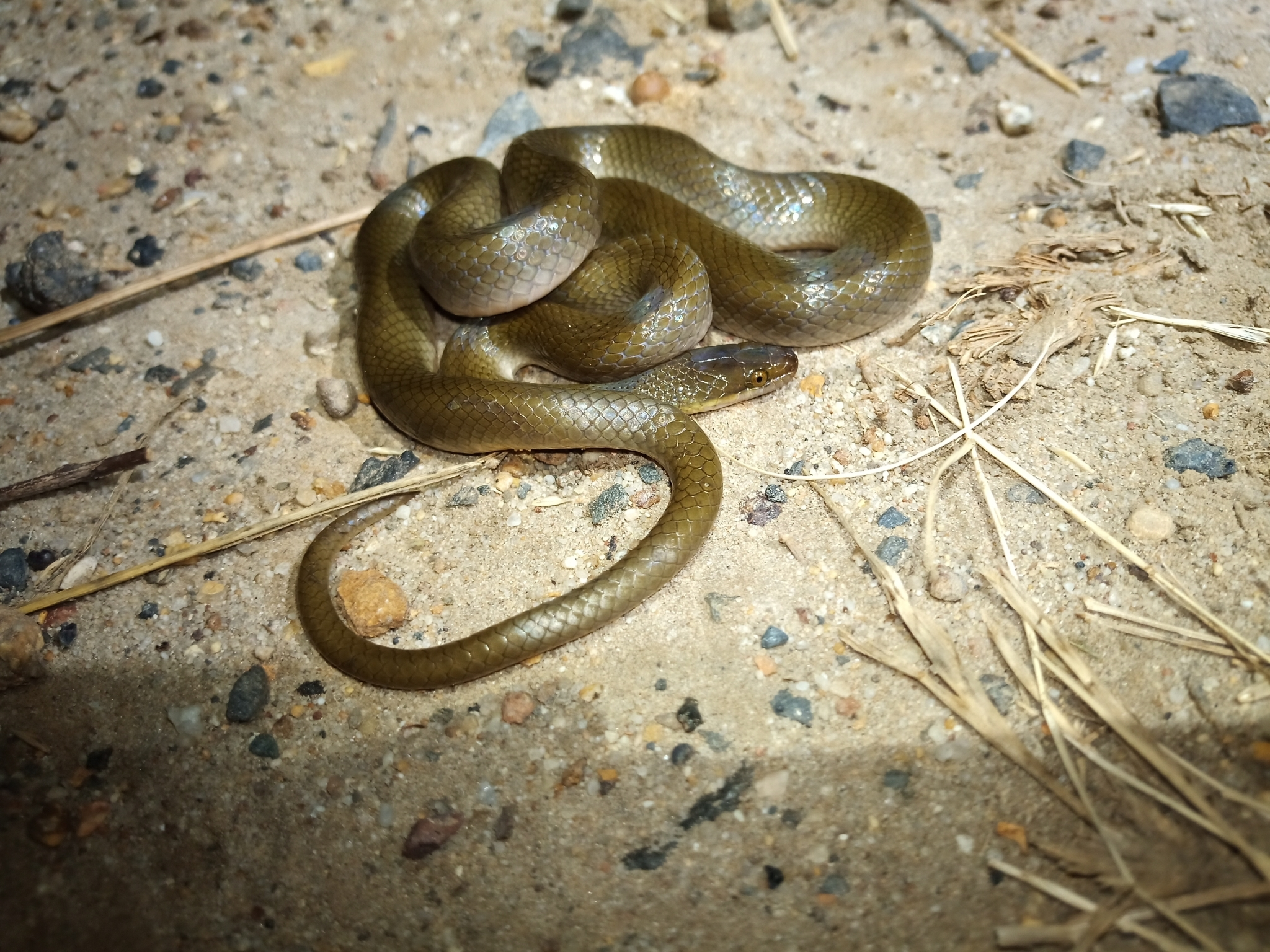

Conservation status
- Least Concern (IUCN 3.1)

Scientific classification
- Kingdom: Animalia
- Phylum: Chordata
- Class: Reptilia
- Order: Squamata
- Suborder: Serpentes
- Family: Lamprophiidae
- Genus: Lycodonomorphus
- Species: L. rufulus

Binomial name
- Lycodonomorphus rufulus (Lichtenstein, 1823)

= Common brown water snake =

Species of snake

The common brown water snake (Lycodonomorphus rufulus) is a species of nonvenomous South African snake.

This gentle, harmless snake is by far the most common water snake in southern Africa. It can be found from Cape Town in the south, along the wet east coast of South Africa and inland as far as Gauteng, Lesotho, and Zimbabwe. Throughout its range, its natural habitat is water margins, where it shelters under leaves and logs. It emerges at night to hunt frogs and sometimes rodents. It lays up to 10 eggs at the end of summer.

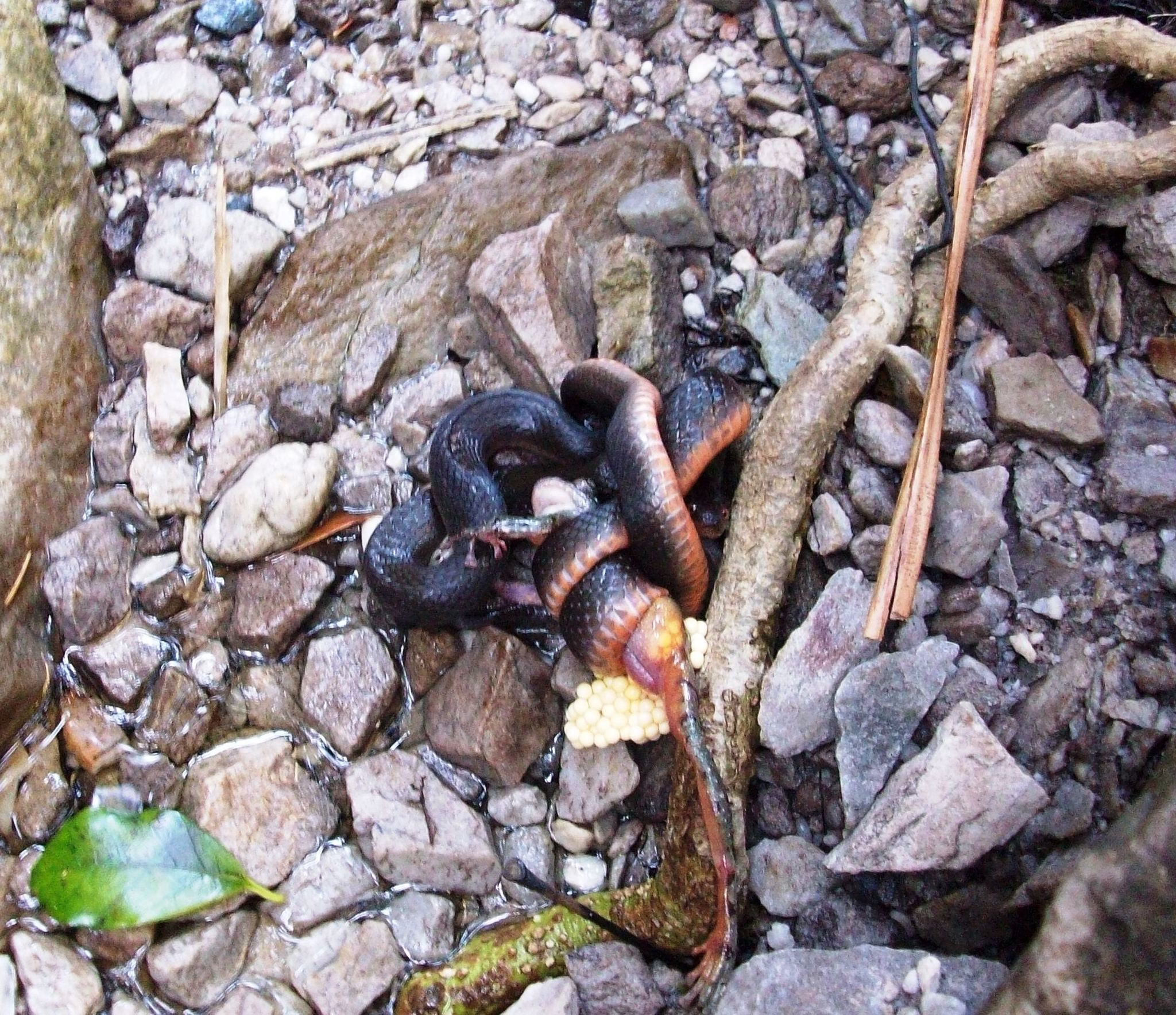
Eating a Purcell's ghost frog
