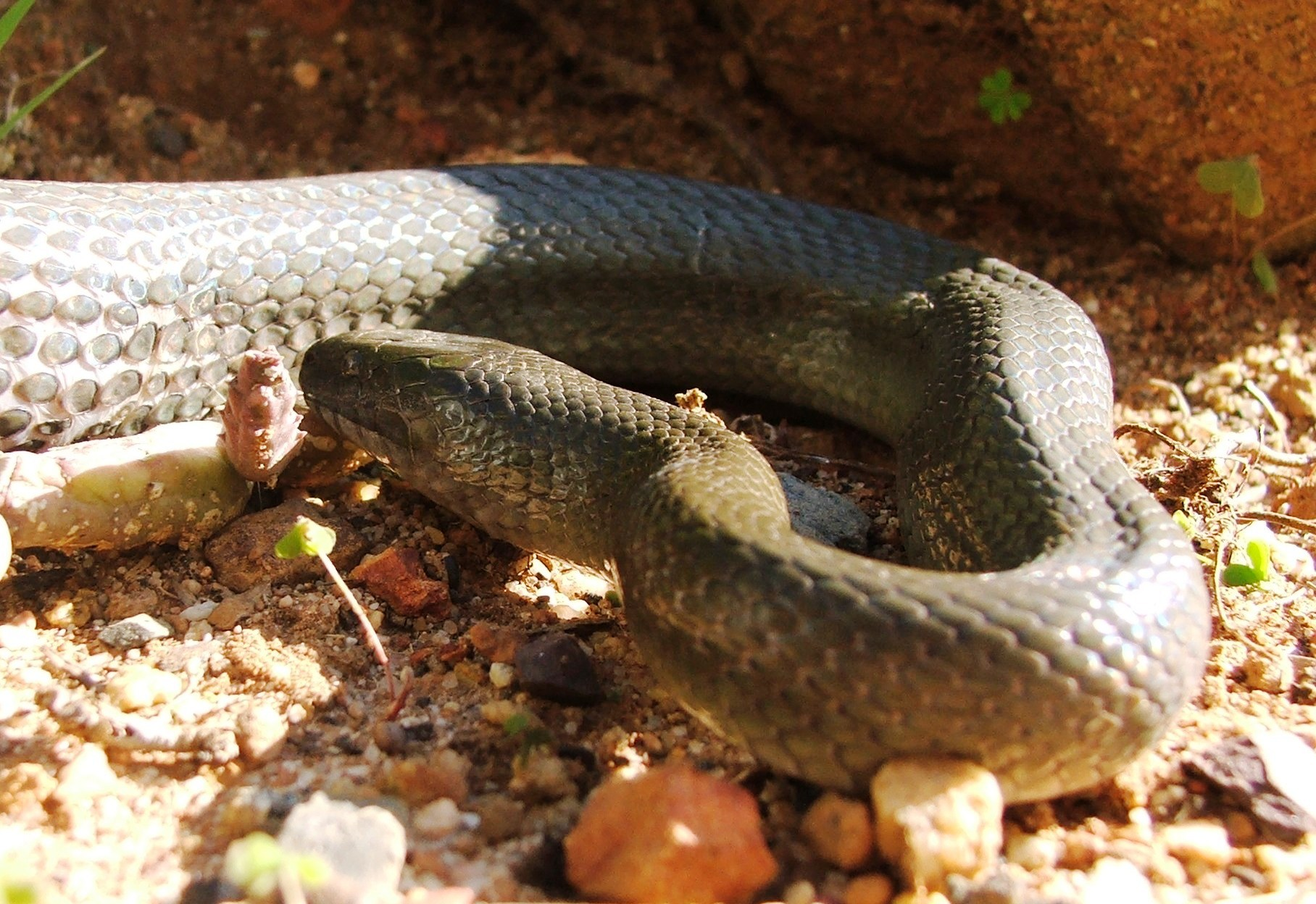
- L. inornatus, the Olive House Snake

Scientific classification
- Kingdom: Animalia
- Phylum: Chordata
- Class: Reptilia
- Order: Squamata
- Suborder: Serpentes
- Family: Lamprophiidae
- Subfamily: Lamprophiinae
- Genus: Lycodonomorphus; Fitzinger 1843

Species
- Nine recognized species, see text.

= Lycodonomorphus =

Genus of snakes

Lycodonomorphus is a genus of snakes commonly referred to as African water snakes. They are small, nonvenomous snakes, with all members being endemic to Africa.

== Species ==
The following eight species are recognized as being valid.

- Lycodonomorphus bicolor (Günther, 1893) — Tanganyika white-bellied water snake
- Lycodonomorphus laevissimus (Günther, 1862) — Dusky-bellied water snake
- Lycodonomorphus leleupi (Laurent, 1950) — Congo dark-bellied water snake, Mulanje water snake
- Lycodonomorphus mlanjensis Loveridge, 1953 — Mlanje white-bellied water snake
- Lycodonomorphus obscuriventris V. FitzSimons, 1963 — Floodplain water snake
- Lycodonomorphus rufulus (Lichtenstein, 1823) — Common brown water snake
- Lycodonomorphus subtaeniatus Laurent, 1954 — Eastern Congo white-bellied water snake, Lined water snake
- Lycodonomorphus whytii (Boulenger, 1897) — Whyte's water snake

Nota bene: A binomial authority in parentheses indicates that the species was originally described in a genus other than Lycodonomorphus.

== Etymology ==
The specific name, whytii, is in honor of British naturalist Alexander Whyte (1834–1908), who worked in Nyasaland (now Malawi) from 1891 to 1897.
