= Pseudoboodon lemniscatus =

Striped Ethiopian snake

Conservation status
- Least Concern (IUCN 3.1)

Scientific classification
- Kingdom: Animalia
- Phylum: Chordata
- Class: Reptilia
- Order: Squamata
- Suborder: Serpentes
- Family: Lamprophiidae
- Genus: Pseudoboodon
- Species: P. lemniscatus

Binomial name
- Pseudoboodon lemniscatus Duméril, Bibron & Duméril, 1854

Synonyms
- Boaedon lemniscatum Duméril, Bibron & Duméril, 1864; Boodon lemniscatus Boulenger, 1893; Lamprophis rogeri Mocquard, 1904; Pseudobodoon erlangeri Werner, 1923; Boaedon lemniscatus Scortecci, 1929

Species of snake

Pseudoboodon lemniscatus, the striped Ethiopian snake or banded snake, is a species of snake in the family Lamprophiidae. It is native to Ethiopia and Eritrea.

== Ecology ==
In 2014 it was classified in the IUCN Red List as of "Least Concern".
