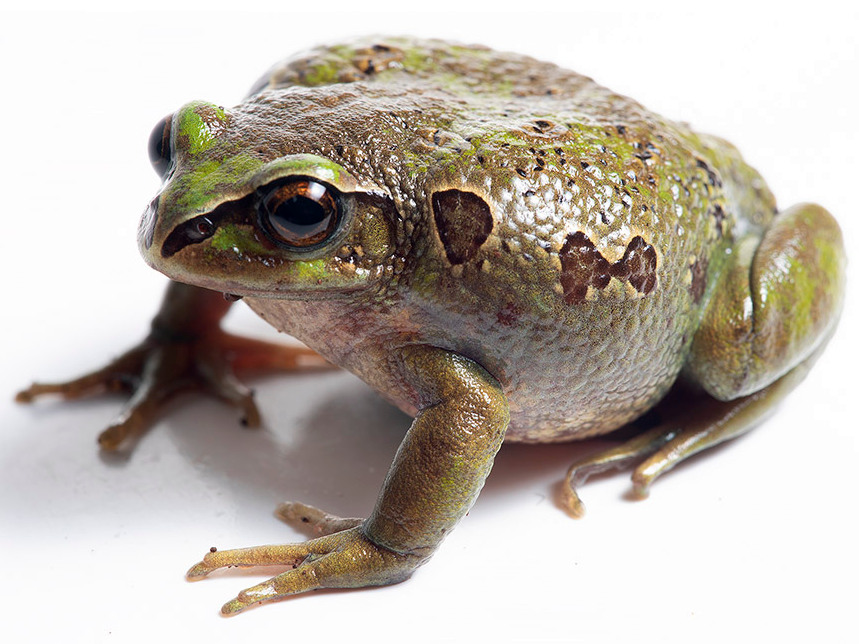

Scientific classification
- Kingdom: Animalia
- Phylum: Chordata
- Class: Amphibia
- Order: Anura
- Family: Arthroleptidae
- Genus: Leptopelis
- Species: L. montanus

Binomial name
- Leptopelis montanus Tiutenko and Zinenko, 2021

= Leptopelis montanus =

Ethiopian frog

Leptopelis montanus, the ocellated burrowing treefrog, is a species of frog in the family Arthroleptidae. It is endemic to Ethiopia, and is a parapatric cryptid of the L. gramineus complex that resides in the Harenna Forest of south-eastern Ethiopia. L. montanus resides in the Bale and Arsi mountain highlands to the east of the Rift Valley.

== Description ==
Leptopelis montanus has a small body size, and the digital discs on fingers and toes are significantly more distinct than in other semi-fossorial members of the L. gramineus complex. Both L. gramineus and L. montanus, however, have discs that are virtually absent in comparison with their close relatives, namely L. diffidens. In the examined specimens of L. montanus the digital discs are more of a delicate padding, with the tips of the toes more narrow than the phalanges.

Females within L. montaus are generally larger than their male counterparts. Compared to other frogs within the L. gramineus complex, L. montanus has a dorsal skin pattern of scattered blotches and ocelli. They do not typically have the continuous black lateral bands that are seen in L. diffidens.

== Communication ==
Males often call from water-encircled tussocks or tall and dense grass at pool margins and puddles, where they sit near the root of the gross as opposed to on the grass or in the water. The calls are relatively feeble compared to the loud calls of the surrounding organisms in their environment, and the frogs will stop calling and remain silent for several minutes once approached. It has been observed that calling individuals and call frequency both increase during the rainy season (May–June) for L. montanus.

The call itself is classified as a 'quack' consisting of a single note containing five pulses. Pulse interval of ca. 20ms, and tone frequency around 344-3270 Hz, and there has been record of a "scream" occasionally preceding said 'quack'.

== Taxonomic status ==
Due to erroneous type locality placement upon first encounter with this species, L. montanus had originally been described as Pseudocassina ocellata., a species that had been later synonymized with L. gramineus. Once resolved to its proper locality, it was resurrected as a valid species under the description L. ocellatus, with the proposed vernacular "ocellated burrowing treefrog" due to its coloration. Leptopelis ocellatus being already in use by a species in West Africa, the name was then adjusted to L. montanus.
