= Panaspis ericae =

Scientific classification
- Kingdom: Animalia
- Phylum: Chordata
- Class: Reptilia
- Order: Squamata
- Family: Scincidae
- Genus: Panaspis
- Species: P. ericae

Binomial name
- Panaspis ericae Marques, Parrinha, Lopes-Lima, Tiutenko, Bauer & Ceríaco, 2024

Species of lizard

Panaspis ericae is a species of lidless skinks in the family Scincidae, native to Africa. It was first discovered in 2022 in Angola. It is named for Erica Tavares, an Angolan conservationist and biologist. P. ericae has a coppery-brown appearance and robust body.
