= Bofa =

Bofa may refer to

- Bofa erlangeri, or Ethiopian house snake, the only snake species in the genus Bofa
- Gus Bofa (1883–1968), a French illustrator
- Bank of America, sometimes abbreviated BofA
- bofa, an internet meme and joke
