= Erythrolamprus aenigma =

Scientific classification
- Kingdom: Animalia
- Phylum: Chordata
- Class: Reptilia
- Order: Squamata
- Suborder: Serpentes
- Family: Colubridae
- Genus: Erythrolamprus
- Species: E. aenigma

Binomial name
- Erythrolamprus aenigma Entiauspe-Neto, Abegg, Koch, Nuñez, Azevedo, Moraes, Tiutenko, Bialves, & Loebmann, 2021

Species of snake

Erythrolamprus aenigma, also known commonly as the savannah racer snake, is a species of snake in the family Colubridae. The species is found in Brazil, Guyana, and Venezuela.
