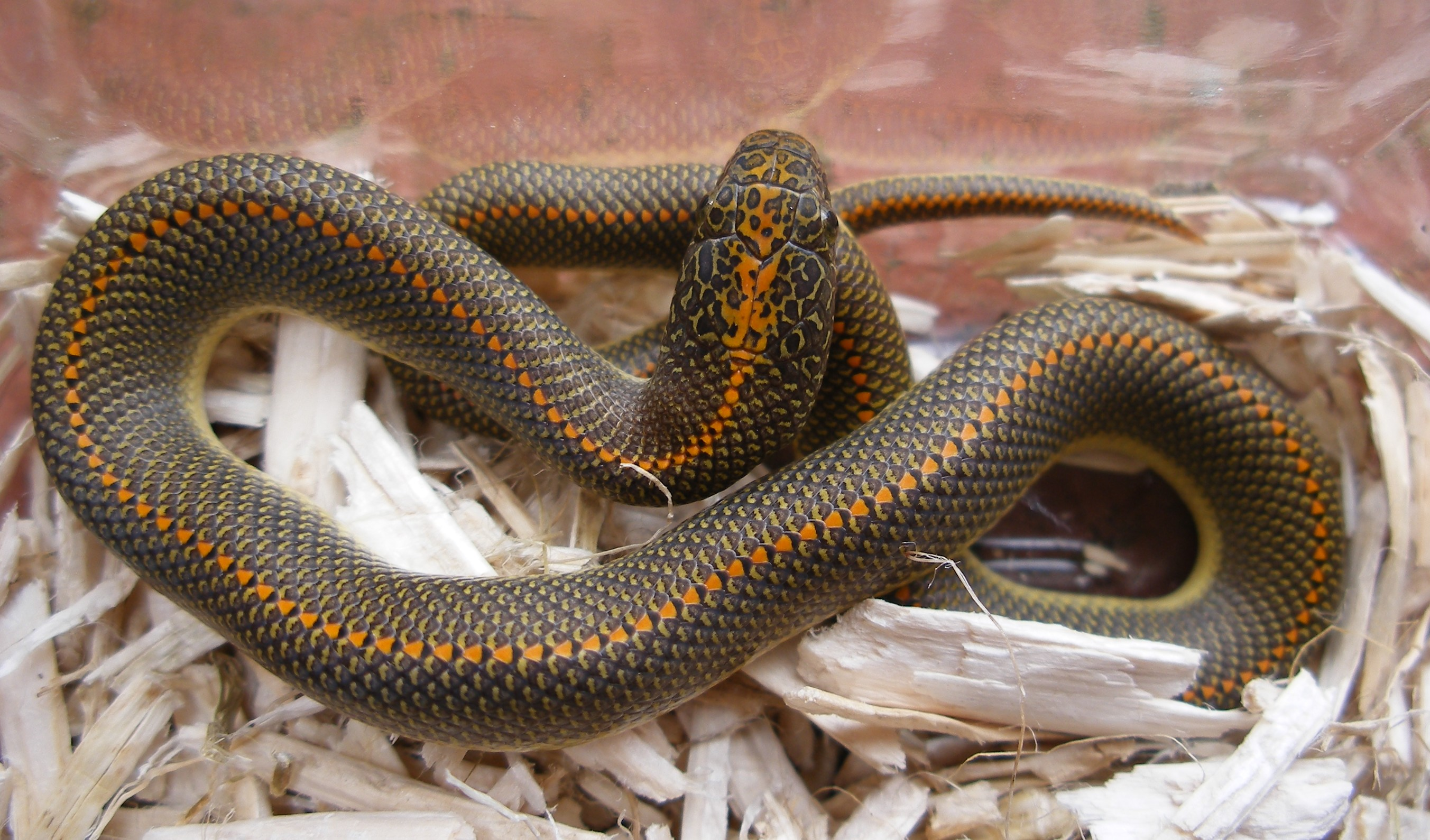

Conservation status
- Least Concern (IUCN 3.1)

Scientific classification
- Kingdom: Animalia
- Phylum: Chordata
- Class: Reptilia
- Order: Squamata
- Suborder: Serpentes
- Family: Lamprophiidae
- Genus: Lamprophis
- Species: L. aurora

Binomial name
- Lamprophis aurora (Linnaeus, 1758)

Synonyms
- Coluber Aurora Linnaeus, 1758

= Aurora house snake =

Species of snake

The Aurora house snake, Aurora snake, African house snake, or night snake (Lamprophis aurora) is a non-venomous species of lamprophiid snake. It is endemic to Southern Africa (South Africa, Lesotho, Eswatini, Botswana).

== Distribution ==
This species of house snake is widespread across South Africa, where it is present all provinces (except for most of the Northern Cape). It also occurs in Lesotho, Eswatini and eastern Botswana, although this might represent a translocation.

== Description ==
The snake can achieve a maximum length of 90 cm, but averages 45–60 cm. Colour varies from shiny olive green to dull dark green above. A bright yellow to orange vertebral stripe runs from the top of the head to the tip of the tail.

== Habitat and ecology ==
This species occurs in grassland, fynbos, and moist savanna habitats at elevations up to 1,700 m (5,600 ft) above sea level. They are often found near streams and under rocks, and may occur in old termitaria.

It is secretive but can be locally common. It is active at night (nocturnal). The diet consists of rodents, lizards, and frogs. The female lays clutches of up to 12 eggs. It is non-venomous and seldom attempts to bite.

== Conservation ==
Grassland habitats that this species inhabits are heavily transformed by urban development and agriculture, but it is not considered threatened because it remains common in suitable habitat and is widespread. Its range overlaps with a number of protected areas.
