= Abyssinian house snake =

Conservation status
- Least Concern (IUCN 3.1)

Scientific classification
- Kingdom: Animalia
- Phylum: Chordata
- Class: Reptilia
- Order: Squamata
- Suborder: Serpentes
- Family: Lamprophiidae
- Genus: Pseudoboodon
- Species: P. abyssinicus

Binomial name
- Pseudoboodon abyssinicus Mocquard, 1906

Species of snake

The Abyssinian house snake (Pseudoboodon abyssinicus), or Ethiopian house snake, is a small species of colubrid snake. It was once thought to be endemic to Ethiopia, but has been found in Eritrea recently.

== Appearance ==
This is a small snake, attaining lengths of 20–24 in (51–61 cm). They are sexually dimorphic, as the females grow larger than the males. The overall colour is a tan brown through orange to red, with large, deep-brown or black stripes running from the rostral scale through the eye to the rear of the head, where they continue down the body. The eyes are large and the pupils are vertically elliptical.

== Behaviour and diet ==
Little is known about this species because it is rather uncommon. It is nocturnal by nature and has been known to feed on small mammals and rodents. They breed at the beginning of the rainy season and are, it is assumed, an egg-laying species.
