= Dasypeltis albigularis =

Scientific classification
- Kingdom: Animalia
- Phylum: Chordata
- Class: Reptilia
- Order: Squamata
- Suborder: Serpentes
- Family: Colubridae
- Genus: Dasypeltis
- Species: D. albigularis

Binomial name
- Dasypeltis albigularis Tiutenko, Heller & Bates, 2026

Species of snake

Dasypeltis albigularis, commonly known as the white-throated egg-eating snake or white-throated egg-eater, is a species of non-venomous snake in the family Colubridae. The species is endemic to the Harenna Forest in southern Ethiopia.

== Description ==
A medium-sized snake (females approximately 90 cm in total length, males less than 60 cm). Above, usually uniformly dark-grey or blackish, seldom reddish-brown with faint dark streaks, or light yellow-brown with a dense and irregular pattern of small brown saddles and narrow brown bars on the flanks, and numerous small white markings. The skin between scales is light grey, sometimes bluish, especially in adults. Lower labial scales, throat, chin shields and the first 20–62 plates on the belly are mostly white. The plates behind them gradually transition to ash-grey or black.

== Geographic range ==
Dasypeltis albigularis is currently known only from the Harenna Forest situated in the southern slopes of the Somalian plateau in eastern Ethiopian highlands. The snake is found in woods, at glade margins, as well es in farms and villages, at elevations of 1500–1700 m above sea level.
