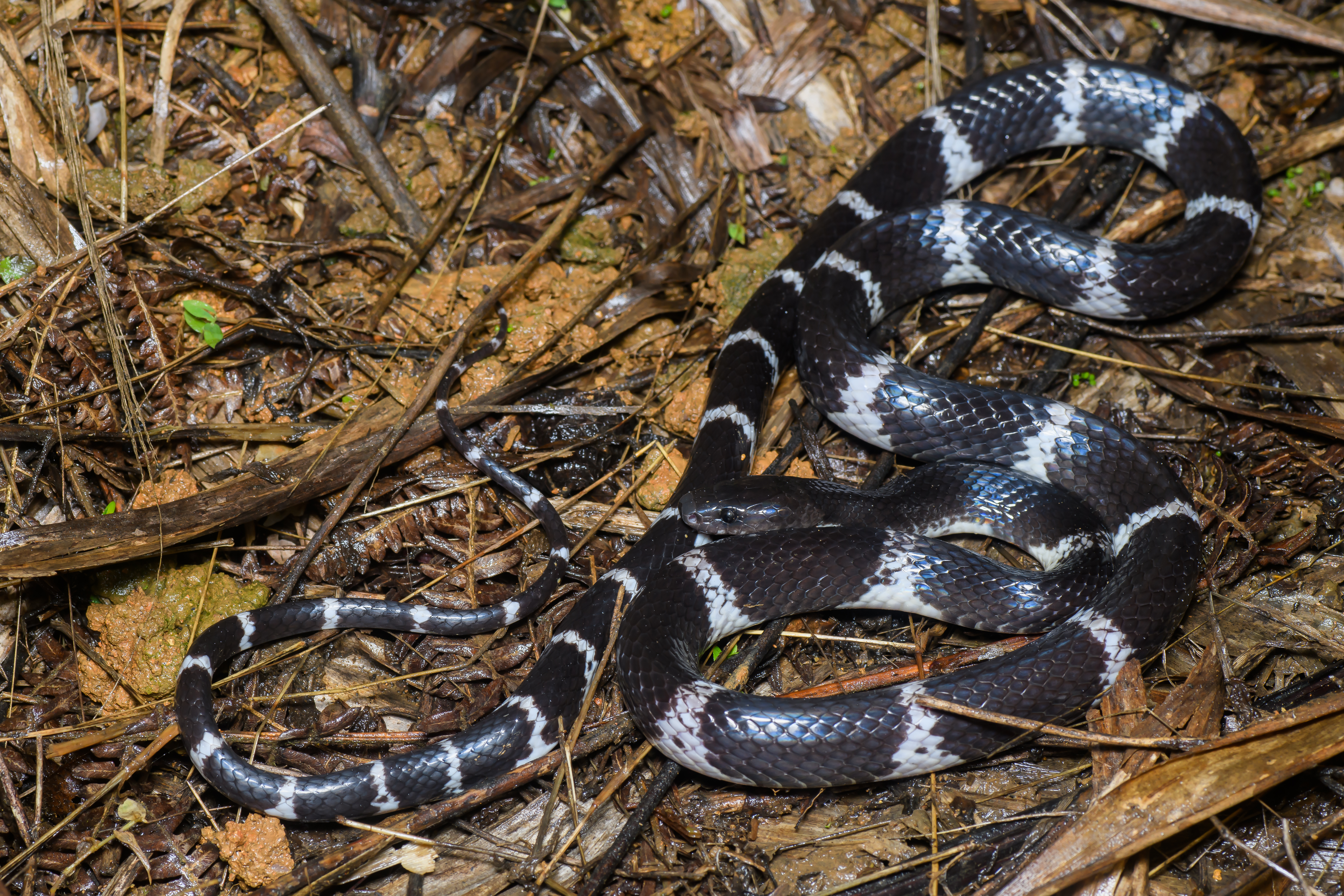

Conservation status
- Least Concern (IUCN 3.1)

Scientific classification
- Kingdom: Animalia
- Phylum: Chordata
- Class: Reptilia
- Order: Squamata
- Suborder: Serpentes
- Family: Colubridae
- Genus: Lycodon
- Species: L. septentrionalis

Binomial name
- Lycodon septentrionalis (Günther, 1875)

Synonyms
- Ophites septentrionalis Günther, 1875; Ophites ruhstrati Fischer, 1886; Lycodon septentrionalis Boulenger, 1890; Dinodon septentrionalis Boulenger, 1893; Dinodon septentrionale Wallach, 2014

= White-banded wolf snake =

Species of snake

The white-banded wolf snake (Lycodon septentrionalis), also known as the northern large-toothed snake, is a species of colubrid snake found in Asia.

== Description ==
The snake has relatively small eyes and its snout is slightly depressed, and not spatulated. The rostral scale is much broader than it is deep, and is visible from above the snake. The scales between the nostrils are much shorter than the prefrontal scales. The frontal scale is slightly longer than it is broad, approximately as long as the distance from the scale to the snout, and shorter than the panetal scales. The loreal scale is small, elongated, and not entering the eye. The snake has one preocular and two postocular scales, and between 2 and 3 temporal scales. It has eight upper labial scales, with the third, fourth, and fifth entering the eye; its five lower labials are in contact with the anterior chin shields, which are longer than the posterior. It has 17 rows of scales, with the scales in the seven middle rows possessing a slight keel. Its 214 ventral scales are angulated laterally; the anal scale is entire; its 83 subcaudals are in two rows. The snake is black above and on the sides, with narrow, whitish, transverse bands. The bands form complete rings on the tail, which is dark brown on its lower surface. The snake's belly is whitish, with a few brown spots towards the rear. It can grow to a length of three feet, of which the tail consists of eight inches.

== Etymology ==
Septentrionalis is Latin for "northern", from the phrase septem triones, meaning "seven plough oxen", indicating the seven stars of Ursa Major or Ursa Minor.

== Distribution ==
The white-banded wolf snake is found in the North-east Indian regions of Darjeeling and Assam, in the Himalayan foothills and in the Khasi hills. It is also found across Myanmar, Laos, Vietnam, Thailand, Indonesia and the Chinese province of Yunnan. It is also found in Bangladesh and possibly found in Bhutan. Although records exist from Taiwan and Japan, these are likely to be incorrectly identified specimens of Lycodon ruhstrati.

== Reproduction ==
The white-banded wolf snake is oviparous, or egg-laying.
