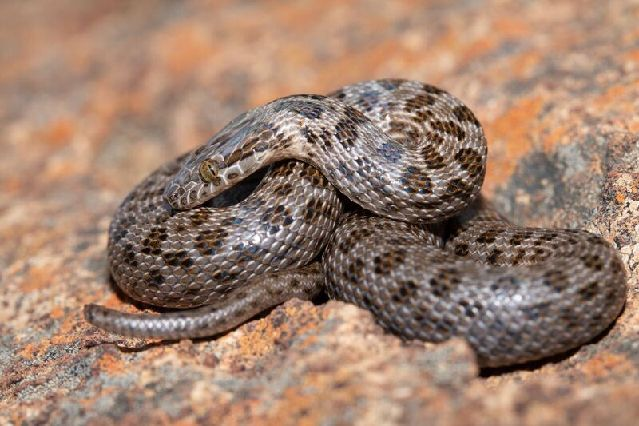

Conservation status
- Least Concern (IUCN 3.1)

Scientific classification
- Kingdom: Animalia
- Phylum: Chordata
- Class: Reptilia
- Order: Squamata
- Suborder: Serpentes
- Family: Lamprophiidae
- Genus: Alopecion; Duméril, 1853
- Species: A. guttatum

Binomial name
- Alopecion guttatum (Smith, 1843)

Synonyms
- Lycodon guttatus; Alopecion annulifer; Boodon guttatus

= Spotted house snake =

Species of snake

The spotted house snake, (Alopecion guttatum), belongs to the monotypic genus Alopecion.

== Description ==
It has unique patterning on its body, which is not easily confused with other southern African snakes. Spotted house snakes are small and slender, with the average length of 40–60 cm (16–24 in), and a maximum length of 65 cm (26 in). The body is cream white to light brown, with round spots, which are dark brown. Sometimes, the spots are connected. The eyes are medium-sized and copper brown, with vertical pupils. The head is very flat and broad, which is probably an adaptation for accessing narrow rock crevices.

== Scale count ==
Midbody scale rows range from 21 to 25, the anal shield is entire, and the subcaudals (46–72) are paired. There are between 186 and 230 ventral scales, the ventral and dorsal scales are smooth and highly polished.

== Biology ==
Spotted house snakes are habitat specialists, occurring in rocky areas, often hiding under exfoliating rock flakes or between narrow crevices. They are nocturnal and hunt for crevice-living lizards. In captivity, they are known to take small rodents, as well.

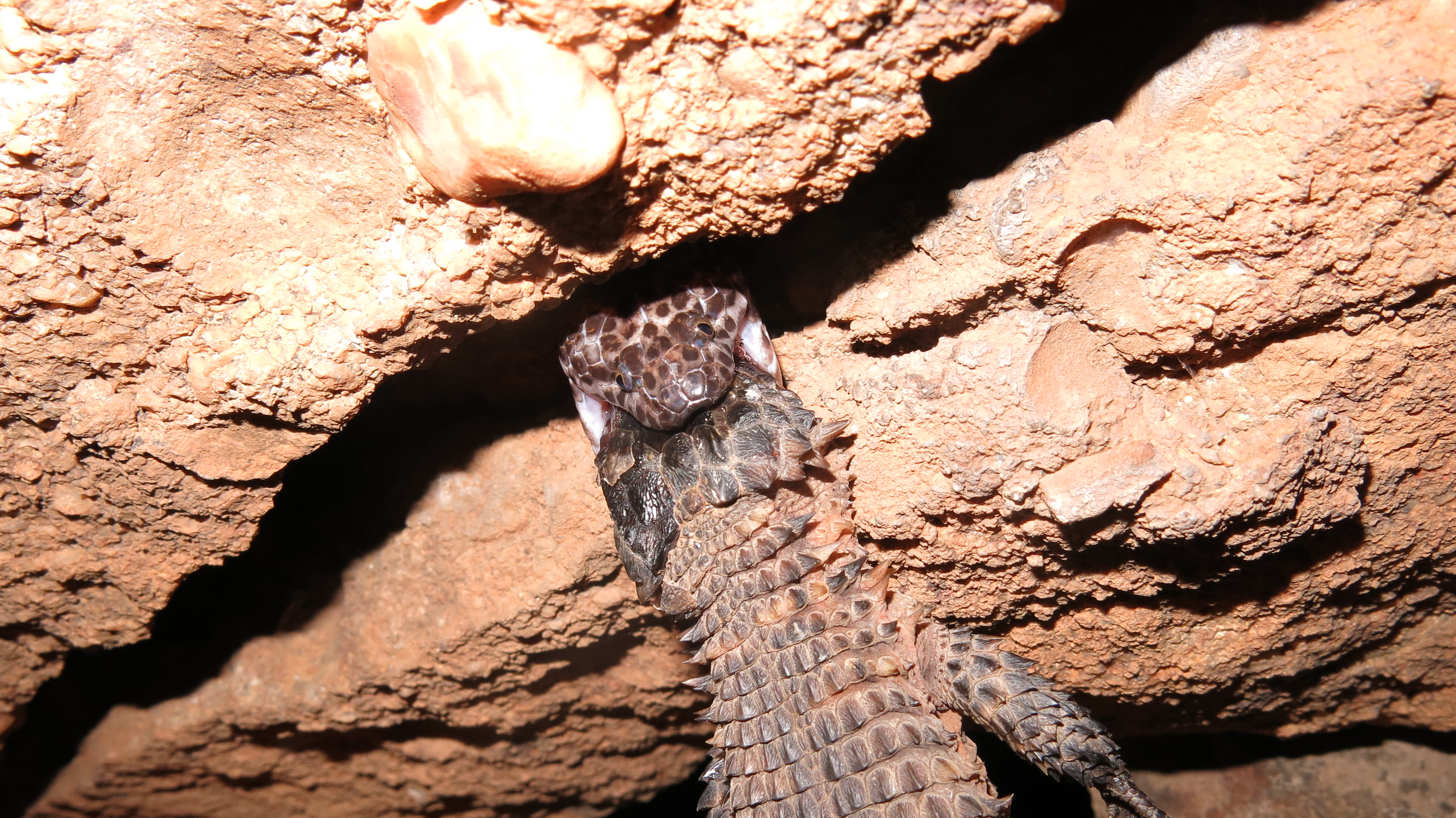
Spotted house snake (in crevice) feeding on a Waterberg girdled lizard

== Reproduction ==
Small clutches of between three and six eggs are laid in summer. Eggs measure 38 by 20 mm (1.50 by 0.79 in).

== Distribution ==
The spotted house snake is widespread in the eastern parts of South Africa. The distribution also extends up the West Coast into Namibia.
