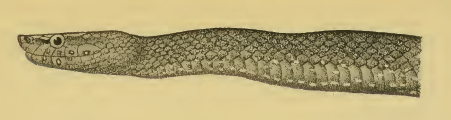
- Pseudoboodon

Scientific classification
- Kingdom: Animalia
- Phylum: Chordata
- Class: Reptilia
- Order: Squamata
- Suborder: Serpentes
- Family: Lamprophiidae
- Subfamily: Lamprophiinae
- Genus: Pseudoboodon; Peracca, 1897

= Pseudoboodon =

Genus of snakes

Pseudoboodon is a genus of snakes in the family Lamprophiidae. The genus is endemic to Africa.

== Species ==
Five species are recognized as being valid.

- Pseudoboodon abyssinicus Mocquard, 1906 – Abyssinian house snake
- Pseudoboodon boehmei Rasmussen & Largen, 1992
- Pseudoboodon gascae Peracca, 1897
- Pseudoboodon lemniscatus (A.M.C. Duméril, Bibron & A.H.A. Duméril, 1854)
- Pseudoboodon sandfordorum Spawls, 2004

Nota bene: A binomial authority in parentheses indicates that the species was originally described in a genus other than Pseudoboodon.
