= Hormonotus =

Scientific classification
- Kingdom: Animalia
- Phylum: Chordata
- Class: Reptilia
- Order: Squamata
- Suborder: Serpentes
- Family: Lamprophiidae
- Subfamily: Lamprophiinae
- Genus: Hormonotus; Hallowell, 1857
- Species: H. modestus

Binomial name
- Hormonotus modestus (Duméril, Bibron, and Auguste Duméril, 1854)

Synonyms
- Lamprophis modestus Duméril, Bibron & Duméril, 1854; Boodon modestus (Duméril, Bibron & Duméril, 1854); Boodon vossii Fischer, 1888; Dipsas modestus (Duméril, Bibron & Duméril, 1854); Heterolepis glaber Jan, 1862; Hormonotus audax Hallowell, 1857

Genus of snakes

Hormonotus is a genus of snakes. At present, this genus is monotypic, as there is only one commonly accepted species in it, Hormonotus modestus, commonly known as the Uganda house snake or yellow forest snake. It is widespread in tropical Africa. Its sister taxon is Inyoka swazicus, the Swazi rock snake.

== Distribution ==
The snake is found in Angola, the Democratic Republic of the Congo (DRC), Republic of Congo (RoC − Brazzaville), Gabon, Liberia, Sierra Leone, Uganda and some other parts of Africa.
