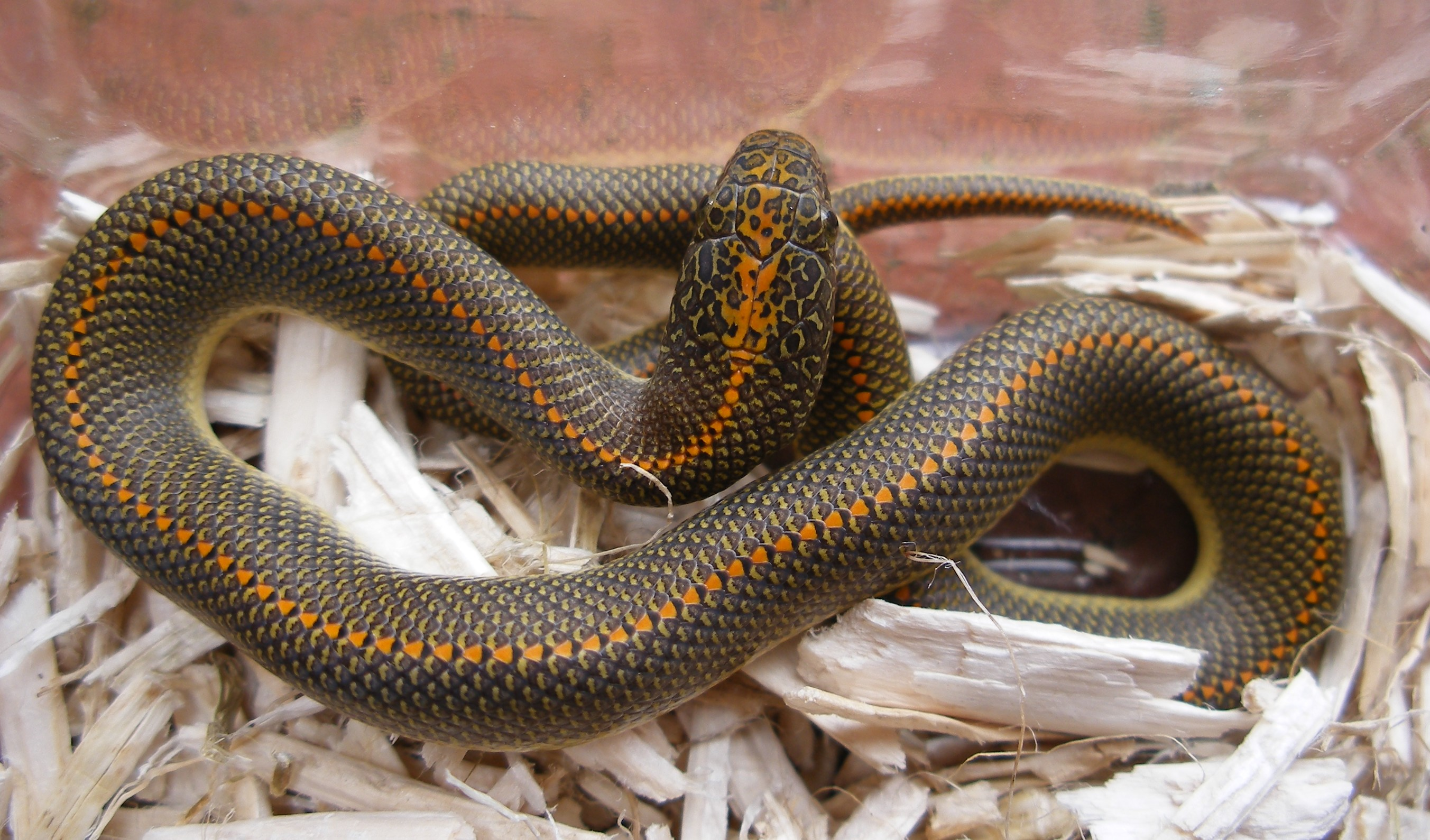
- Lamprophis aurora, aurora house snake

Scientific classification
- Kingdom: Animalia
- Phylum: Chordata
- Class: Reptilia
- Order: Squamata
- Suborder: Serpentes
- Family: Lamprophiidae
- Subfamily: Lamprophiinae
- Genus: Lamprophis; Fitzinger, 1843

Species
- 3 recognized species, see article.

= Lamprophis =

Genus of snakes

Lamprophis is a genus of medium-sized, nonvenomous snakes commonly referred to as African house snakes, in the family Lamprophiidae.

== Description ==
Species of Lamprophis exhibit a wide variety of pattern variation, and may be spotted, striped, or solid in color. House snakes are sexually dimorphic, the females grow significantly larger, to about 120 cm (47 in) in some species, and some specimens have been recorded over 150 cm (59 in), the males only grow to around 75 cm (30 in). Albino variants of Lamprophis aurora have been found.

== Species ==
As of 2022, 3 species in the genus Lamprophis are recognized:

- Lamprophis aurora (Linnaeus, 1758) – aurora house snake
- Lamprophis fiskii Boulenger, 1887 – Fisk's house snake, vulnerable (VU)
- Lamprophis fuscus Boulenger, 1893 – yellow-bellied house snake, near threatened (LR/nt)

Nota bene: A binomial authority in parentheses indicates that the species was originally described in a genus other than Lamprophis.

The species formerly known as Lamprophis capensis, the brown house snake or Cape house snake, has been assigned to the genus Boaedon, as Boaedon capensis.

The species formerly known as Lamprophis erlangeri, the Ethiopian house snake, has been assigned to the genus Bofa as Bofa erlangeri.

== Geographic range ==
House snakes are found throughout all of sub-Saharan Africa in a wide variety of habitats; some species are well adapted to living in burrows. They are named "house" snakes as they are frequently found around human dwellings, feeding on the rodents that congregate around human waste. They are extremely adaptable snakes, and are found in scrubland, woodland, savannah, and montane regions.

== Behaviour and diet ==
Wild house snakes are often very nervous, but are not prone to biting. Their first defensive reaction is to flee. They are frequently found in and around human dwellings, where they consume rodents, small lizards, and even birds. House snakes are prolific breeders and lay clutches averaging eight to 12 eggs that hatch after around two months of incubation. Hatchlings are typically around 20 cm long.

== In captivity ==
African house snakes are common in the exotic pet trade. The primary species available is B. capensis, with the others being harder to acquire. They are easy to care for and breed readily. They can live up to 20 years with proper care. Males are smaller than females and seldom grow longer than 2.5 ft (76 cm). Females can attain lengths of 3.5 feet (110 cm), and specimens from the eastern region of southern Africa (KwaZulu-Natal) are reported to reach lengths of 5 ft (1.5 m) or more. These snakes are nocturnal. The female lays one clutch of 9 to 16 eggs in early spring. They are known to store sperm and can lay up to six clutches per year in captivity, but it rarely happens in nature. Hatchlings are 5–7 in (13–18 cm) upon hatching.

== Diet ==
Their main diet consists of rodents; in captivity, smaller snakes take pinkie mice, and in the wild they more commonly prey on geckos until they are powerful enough to constrict mice. Large females are known to occasionally eat weanling rats. Adult snakes get fed weekly. Hatchlings may eat small lizards, such as skinks and geckos, and newborn mice. In captivity, they can successfully be fed on gecko tails. Larger specimens are also known to take lizards, and in rare cases they will catch small bats. House snakes should be fed alone; their often violent feeding response may cause cannibalism.
