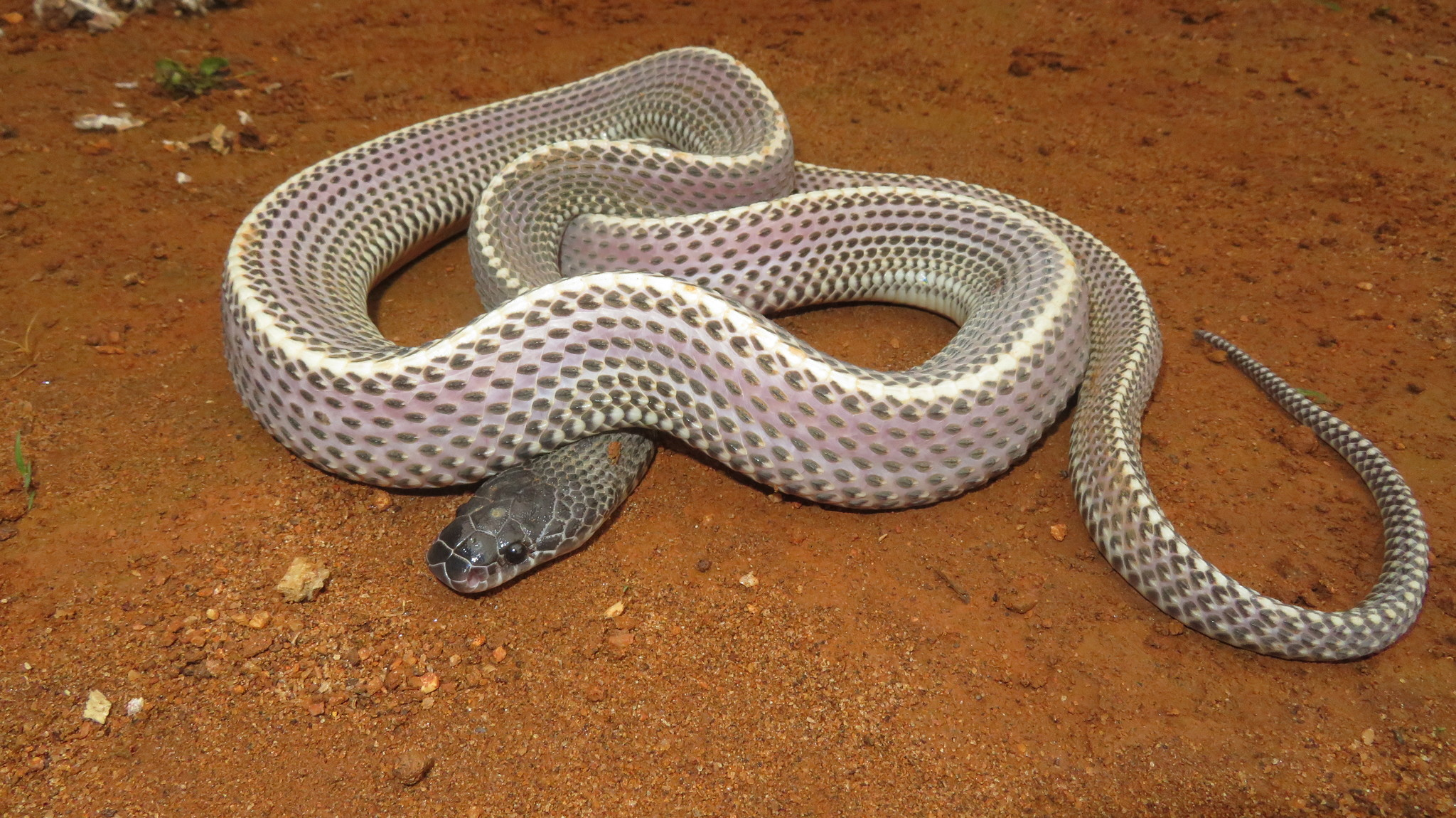
- Limaformosa capensis

Scientific classification
- Kingdom: Animalia
- Phylum: Chordata
- Class: Reptilia
- Order: Squamata
- Suborder: Serpentes
- Family: Lamprophiidae
- Subfamily: Lamprophiinae
- Genus: Limaformosa; Broadley, Tolley, Conradie, Wishart, J.-F. Trape, Burger, Kusamba, Zassi-Boulou & Greenbaum, 2018

= Limaformosa =

Genus of snakes

Limaformosa is a genus of snakes, commonly known as file snakes, in the family Lamprophiidae. The genus is endemic to Africa.

== Etymology ==
The generic name, Limaformosa, is from Latin lima meaning "file" + formosa meaning "beautifully formed".

== Species ==
There are six recognized species in the genus:

- Limaformosa capensis (A. Smith, 1847) – Cape file snake
- Limaformosa chanleri (Stejneger, 1893) – unicolor file snake
- Limaformosa crossi (Boulenger, 1895) – Crosse's file snake, West African file snake
- Limaformosa guirali (Mocquard, 1887) – Mocquard's file snake
- Limaformosa savorgnani (Mocquard, 1887) – Congo file snake
- Limaformosa vernayi (Bogert, 1940) – Angolan file snake

Nota bene: A binomial authority in parentheses indicates that the species was originally described in a genus other than Limaformosa.
