= Cameroon rainforest snake =

Scientific classification
- Kingdom: Animalia
- Phylum: Chordata
- Class: Reptilia
- Order: Squamata
- Suborder: Serpentes
- Family: Lamprophiidae
- Subfamily: Lamprophiinae
- Genus: Dendrolycus; Laurent, 1956
- Species: D. elapoides

Binomial name
- Dendrolycus elapoides Günther, 1874

Species of snake

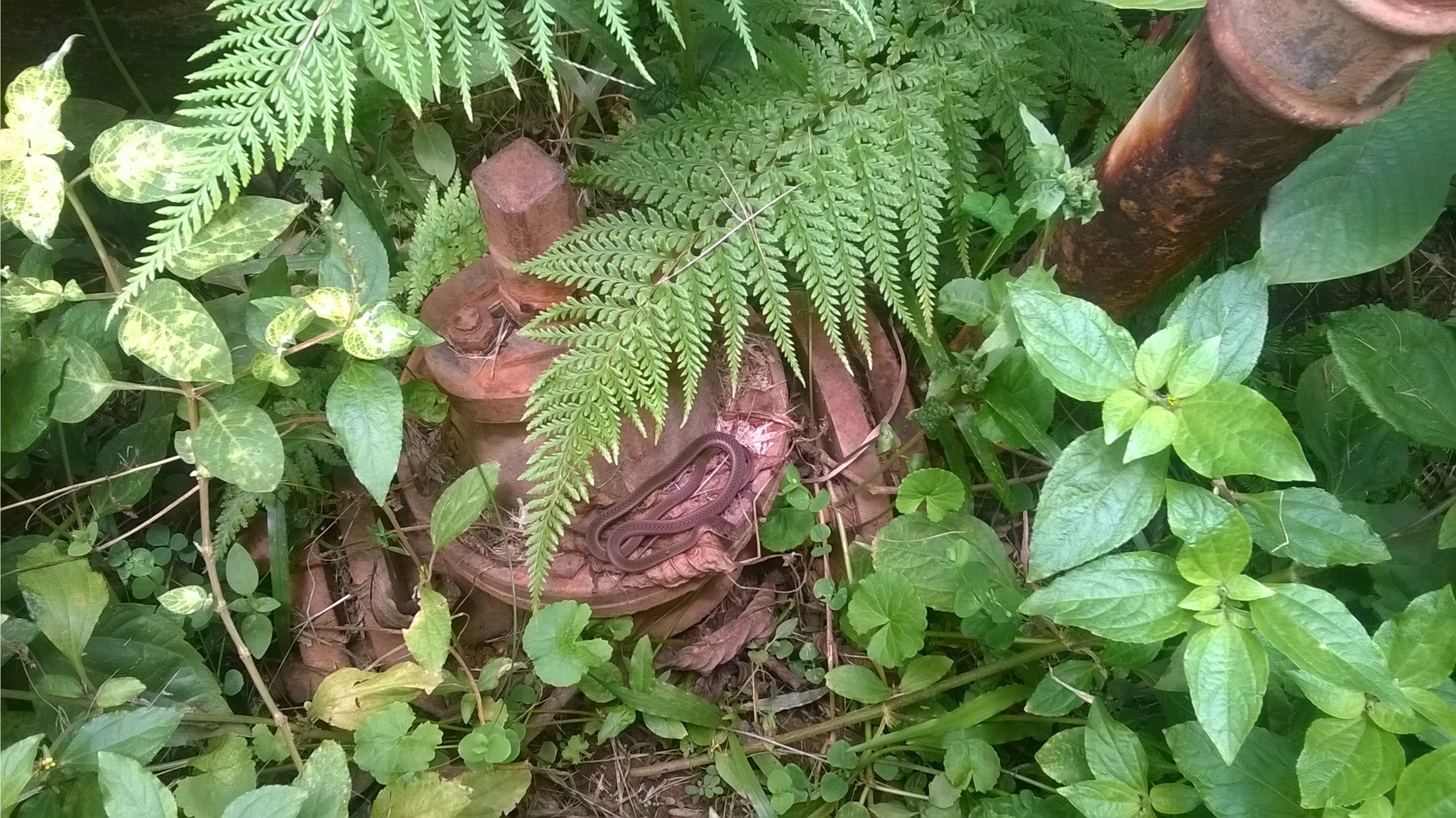
A little snake basking in the sun

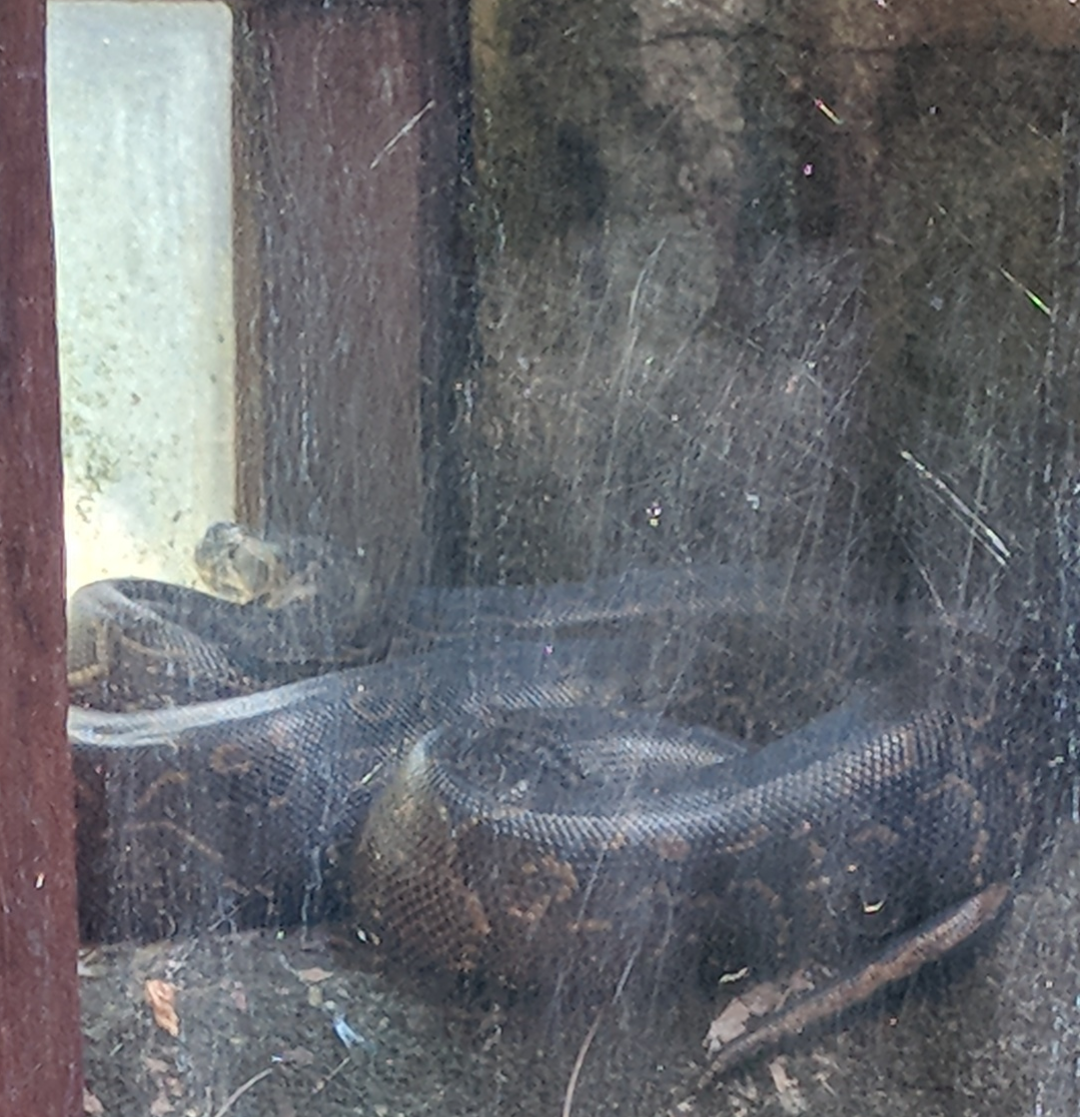
A mature snake confined at the Limbe wildlife centre

The Cameroon rainforest snake (Dendrolycus elapoides) is a species of snake. It is monotypical of the genus, Dendrolycus.
