= Elaiophis =

Scientific classification
- Kingdom: Animalia
- Phylum: Chordata
- Class: Reptilia
- Order: Squamata
- Suborder: Serpentes
- Family: Lamprophiidae
- Genus: Elaiophis; Tiutenko, Maliuk & Koch, 2025

Species
- Elaiophis inornatus (Duméril, Bibron & Duméril, 1854)

Genus of snakes

Elaiophis is a genus of snakes commonly referred to as African olive snakes. They are medium-sized, nonvenomous snakes, with one member endemic to South Africa and Swaziland.
