= Cream-spotted mountain snake =

Conservation status
- Data Deficient (IUCN 3.1)

Scientific classification
- Kingdom: Animalia
- Phylum: Chordata
- Class: Reptilia
- Order: Squamata
- Suborder: Serpentes
- Family: Lamprophiidae
- Genus: Montaspis; Bourquin, 1991
- Species: M. gilvomaculata

Binomial name
- Montaspis gilvomaculata Bourquin, 1991

Species of snake

The cream-spotted mountain snake (Montaspis gilvomaculata) is a snake in the family Lamprophiidae .

It is found in South Africa.
