= Red-black striped snake =

Scientific classification
- Kingdom: Animalia
- Phylum: Chordata
- Class: Reptilia
- Order: Squamata
- Suborder: Serpentes
- Family: Lamprophiidae
- Subfamily: Lamprophiinae
- Genus: Bothrophthalmus; Peters, 1863
- Species: B. lineatus

Binomial name
- Bothrophthalmus lineatus Schlegel, 1856

Species of snake

The red-black striped snake (Bothrophthalmus lineatus) is the monotypical member of the genus Bothrophthalmus. This snake is found in the Sub-Saharan African countries of Rwanda, Uganda, Burundi, Angola and Guinea. It is a harmless snake, black with five red stripes down its back. It lives in forests and forest islands from 700 to 2300 m altitude, often near water. A terrestrial and nocturnal snake, when not active, it hides in holes, leaf litter, and in or under rotting logs. It may bite furiously if handled (although it is harmless). Females lay clutches of about five eggs; it eats small forest animals such as shrews and mice.

The two recognized subspecies are:

- Bothrophthalmus lineatus brunneus (Günther, 1863)
- Bothrophthalmus lineatus lineatus (Peters, 1863)
