= Chamaelycus =

Scientific classification
- Kingdom: Animalia
- Phylum: Chordata
- Class: Reptilia
- Order: Squamata
- Suborder: Serpentes
- Family: Lamprophiidae
- Subfamily: Lamprophiinae
- Genus: Chamaelycus; Boulenger, 1919

Species
- Three recognized species, see article.

Genus of snakes

Chamaelycus is a genus of snakes, commonly referred to as banded snakes, in the family Lamprophiidae. The genus is native to Central Africa.

== Species ==
The following three species are recognized as being valid.

- Chamaelycus christyi Boulenger, 1919 – Christy's banded snake
- Chamaelycus fasciatus (Günther, 1858) – African banded snake
- Chamaelycus parkeri (Angel, 1934) – Parker's banded snake

Nota bene: A binomial authority in parentheses indicates that the species was originally described in a genus other than Chamaelycus.

== Taxonomy ==
The species formerly known as Chamaelycus werneri (Mocquard, 1902), is considered to be a synonym of C. fasciatus.

== Etymology ==
The specific names, christyi, parkeri, and werneri, are in honor of zoologists Cuthbert Christy, Hampton Wildman Parker, and Franz Werner, respectively.
