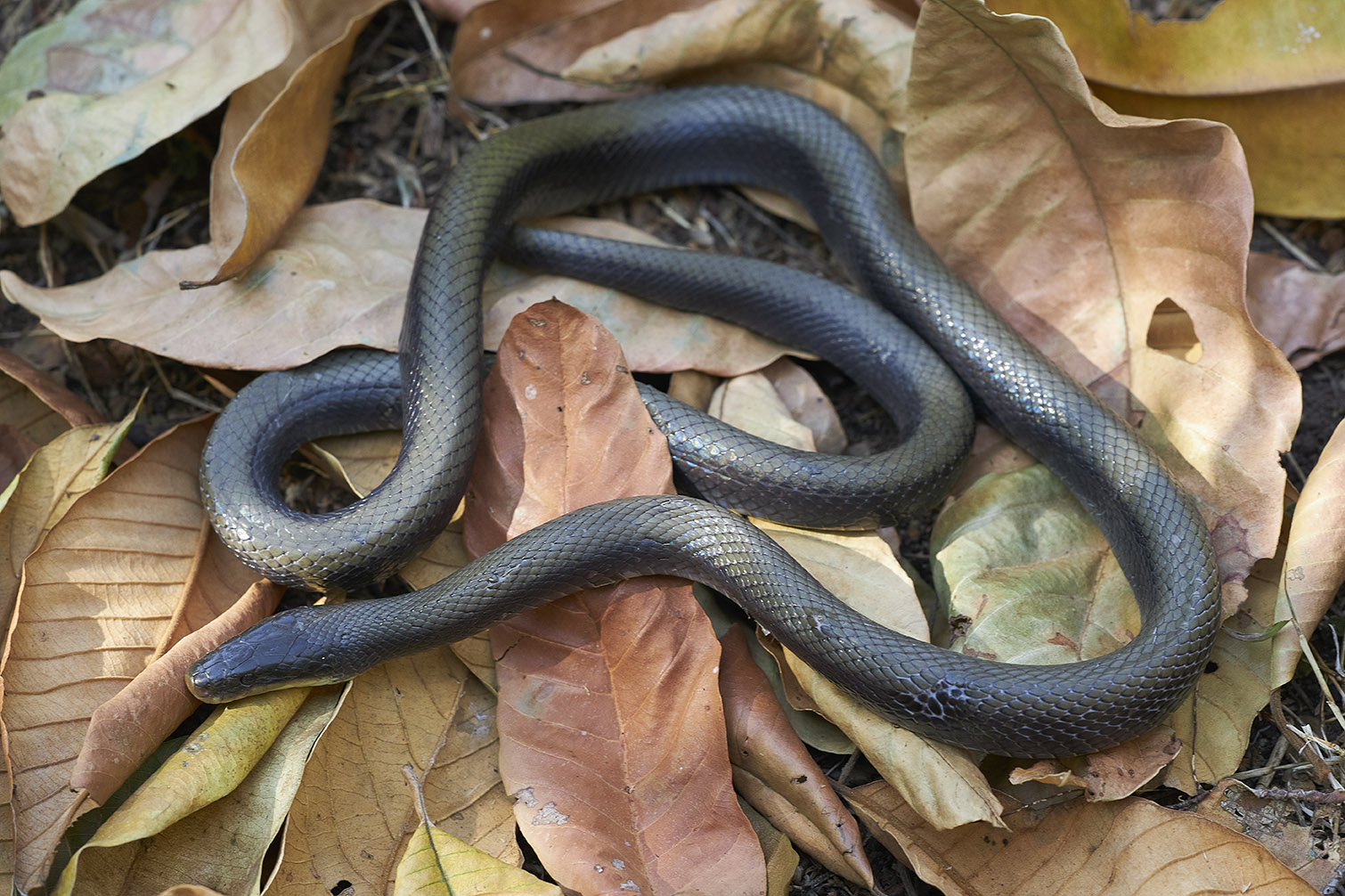

Conservation status
- Vulnerable (IUCN 3.1)

Scientific classification
- Kingdom: Animalia
- Phylum: Chordata
- Class: Reptilia
- Order: Squamata
- Suborder: Serpentes
- Family: Lamprophiidae
- Genus: Bofa; Tiutenko, Koch, Pabijan & Zinenko, 2022
- Species: B. erlangeri

Binomial name
- Bofa erlangeri (Sternfeld, 1908)

Synonyms
- Boodon erlangeri Sternfeld, 1908; Boaedon erlangeri — Meirte, 1982; Lamprophis erlangeri — Nečas, 1997; Boaedon erlangeri — Wallach et al., 2014; Bofa erlangeri — Tiutenko et al., 2022

= Bofa erlangeri =

Species of snake

Bofa erlangeri, also known commonly as the Ethiopian house snake, is a species of snake in the family Lamprophiidae. The species is endemic to Ethiopia.

== Taxonomy ==
Bofa erlangeri is the only species in the genus Bofa.

== Etymology ==
The specific name, erlangeri, is in honor of German ornithologist Carlo von Erlanger, who was one of the collectors of the holotype.

== Geographic range ==
Bofa erlangeri is found in the central plateau of Ethiopia.

== Habitat ==
The preferred natural habitat of Bofa erlangeri is forest, at altitudes of 800–2,800 m (2,600–9,200 ft), and it has also been found in farmland.

== Description ==
Bofa erlangeri may attain a total length (including tail) of 1.2 m (3.9 ft).

== Diet ==
Bofa erlangeri preys upon rodents.

== Reproduction ==
Bofa erlangeri is oviparous.
