= Gonionotophis =

Scientific classification
- Kingdom: Animalia
- Phylum: Chordata
- Class: Reptilia
- Order: Squamata
- Suborder: Serpentes
- Family: Lamprophiidae
- Subfamily: Lamprophiinae
- Genus: Gonionotophis; Boulenger, 1893

Genus of snakes

Gonionotophis is a genus of snakes, known commonly as African ground snakes and file snakes, in the family Lamprophiidae. The genus is endemic to Central Africa.

== Species ==
There are three recognized species in the genus:

- Gonionotophis brussauxi (Mocquard, 1889) – Brussaux's file snake, Mocquard's African ground snake
- Gonionotophis grantii (Günther, 1863) – Grant's African ground snake, Grant's file snake, savanna lesser file snake
- Gonionotophis klingi Matschie, 1893 – Kling's file snake, Matschie's African ground snake

Nota bene: A binomial authority in parentheses indicates that the species was originally described in a genus other than Gonionotophis.

== Etymology ==
The specific name, brussauxi, is in honour of French anthropologist Eugène Brussaux.

The specific name, grantii, is in honor of British physician Robert Edmond Grant.
