= Arthur Tiutenko =

German zoologist and illustrator

- Arthur Tiutenko in 2022
- Born: 25 October 1969 (age 57); Kharkov, USSR
- Known for: Research on amphibians and reptiles of sub-Saharan Africa
- Scientific career
- Fields: herpetology, zoology
- Workplaces: Friedrich-Alexander-Universität Erlangen-Nürnberg

Arthur Tiutenko (Russian: Артур Анатольевич Тютенко; Ukrainian: Артур Анатолійович Тютенко; born 25 October 1969) is a Ukraine-born (at the time the Soviet Union) German herpetologist and nature science illustrator based in Bavaria, Germany.

== Biography ==
Tiutenko was born in Kharkov, Ukrainian SSR (now Kharkiv, Ukraine). His father was a graphic designer and teacher at the Kharkov State School of Art. The mother was a teacher of German language at the Kharkov Secondary School No. 134.

Tiutenko's academic background includes studies in biology, computer science and linguistics. From 1987 to 1992 he studied Germanic linguistics at the Kharkov State University, graduating with a diploma of a linguist and translator in 1992. His next diplomas were in biology (after studies in 1994–2000 at the VN Karazin Kharkiv National University) and computer science (after studies in 2000–2001 at the Kharkiv National University of Radio Electronics). Due to a severe economic and political crisis after Ukraine gained independence in 1991, Tiutenko did not plan a career as a biologist. He first worked as a translator and teacher of German and English. Nonetheless he studied biology at the same time.

After Tiutenko received a doctor degree (PhD in linguistics) in 2000, he moved to Germany, to become a research staff member of the Friedrich-Alexander-Universität Erlangen-Nürnberg where he is in charge of software development for language teaching and automatic knowledge testing. He finally became active as a herpetologist in the 2000s. Since the 2010s his research focuses on the amphibian and reptile fauna of sub-Saharan Africa.

== Herpetological research ==
Tiutenko came to herpetology when he was twelve years old. Once, in 1982, in the exhibition of the Zoological Museum of the Academy of Sciences of the Ukrainian SSR (now National Museum of Natural History at the National Academy of Sciences of Ukraine) in Kiev he was drawing pictures of some snake specimens on display. Someone from the museum staff noticed this and introduced Tiutenko to Nikolay N. Szczerbak who was at that time curator of herpetology at the museum. Szczerbak, who was busy and apparently did not have time for such kids, forwarded Tiutenko to Mikhail L. Golubev, a specialist in Central Asian geckos and a former student of him. As Golubev heard that Tiutenko was from Kharkov, he recommended him to contact Valeriy I. Vedmederya at the Museum of Nature of the Kharkov State University (MNKNU). After returning to Kharkov, Tiutenko met Vedmederya who accepted him as his apprentice in the young zoologists' group that he had organised in 1968 at the museum. In 1969, Vedmederya had founded a club for herpers and herpetoculture enthusiasts. It was a pioneering venture for its time in the Soviet Union where citizen initiatives were strictly regulated and controlled. He gave it the symbolic name "Turanomolge", in honour of Turanomolge menzbieri, an enigmatic species of tailed amphibian described by Alexandr Mikhailovich Nikolsky in Kharkov (from the type specimen that was housed in the museum’s scientific collection). This name perfectly captured the spirit of the Kharkov herpetological community of that time — where a passion for remote expeditions and the study of new or little-known species was multiplied by a desire to be successors to the great herpetologists of the past. Tiutenko joined this organisation in 1983. In 1986 he was elected its secretary and remained it till "Turanomolge" was dissolved in 1991, upon the collapse of the Soviet Union.

The unfavourable economic and political situation was also the reason for Tiutenko to end his activities in herpetoculture. From 1983 to 1991 he kept and bred reptiles (mainly venomous snakes) and some amphibians, but in 1991 had to give up this hobby due to a shortage of everything, including food, electricity, etc. He also had to abandon his intention of becoming a professional zoologist in Ukraine. From 1991 to 1999 Tiutenko earned his living working as a teacher and translator of German and English. He nonetheless became a student of the Biological Department of the V.N. Karazin Kharkiv National University in 1994 that he graduated from in 2000 with a diploma in human population genetics.

Tiutenko returned to herpetology in 2010s, after he settled in Germany. He participated in zoological expeditions to the Caucasus and Central Asia since the 1980s, but since 2012 more intensely to Africa. He contributed to the collections of the Kharkiv Museum of Nature (Ukraine), Bavarian State Collection of Zoology (Germany), Zoological Research Museum Alexander Koenig (Germany) and authored numerous scientific publications.

=== 2012–2026: Research in Ethiopia ===
Ethiopia was the main destination of Tiutenko‘s field work between 2012 and 2026. In these years, he undertook ten field trips to the south of the country. In 2018, Tiutenko was leader of an international zoological expedition to the Harenna Forest that was supported by the National Geographic Society. The expedition aimed to investigate the biodiversity of the forest, including its birds, amphibians and reptiles, and to assess the condition of its ecosystem.

=== Research in Angola ===
In 2022, Tiutenko was a member of a research team (led by Portuguese zoologist Luís M. P. Ceríaco) that surveyed wildlife on Serra da Neve, a mountain in southwestern Angola. They discovered four new species of geckos and two new species of skinks. Subsequently Tiutenko co-authored further species descriptions from Angola.

=== New species and genera described by Arthur Tiutenko ===
Tiutenko is credited with authorship of the following zoological taxon names:

- Bofa – Ethiopian Forest Snakes (genus)
- Elaiophis – African Olive Snakes (genus)
- Acontias mukwando – Serra da Neve Lance-skink
- Dasypeltis albigularis – White-throated Egg-eater
- Erythrolamprus aenigma – Savannah Racer
- Gloydius rickmersi – Alai Pitviper
- Holaspis ngalangi – Ngalangi Gliding Lizard
- Leptopelis diffidens – Harenna Burrowing Tree Frog
- Leptopelis montanus – Montane Burrowing Tree Frog
- Panaspis ericae – Erica's Snake-eyed Skink
- Panaspis mundavambo – Serra da Neve Snake-eyed Skink
- Phrynomantis newtoni – Newton's Rubber Frog
- Rhoptropus nivimontanus – Serra da Neve Day Gecko
- Trachylepis attenboroughi – Attenborough’s Skink
- Trachylepis bouri – Bour’s Skink
- Trachylepis hilariae – Hilária’s Skink
- Trachylepis ovahelelo – Ovahelelo Skink
- Trachylepis suzanae – Suzana’s Wedge-snouted Skink
- Trachylepis vunongue – Mwene Vunongue Skink
- Trachylepis wilsoni – Wilson’s Wedge-snouted Skink

== Illustrator work ==
Tiutenko did not study art as a profession, but learned it from his father who often worked at home on paintings and drawings. Sometimes he took his son to the drawing class that he taught at the Kharkov School of Art. Every year in June the students practiced drawing live animals in the Kharkov Zoo, and Tiutenko, when he was 7-10 years old, was encouraged and allowed by his father to participate in this course. His drawings were evaluated along with students' drawings every day after exercises as if he was a real student.

Arthur Tiutenko in 2015, during an exhibition of his photographs in Museum Koenig, Bonn

Anatoliy Tiutenko, father of Arthur Tiutenko, with students in the 1970s

Since 2015 Tiutenko created over 800 zoological (mainly herpetological) drawings and paintings for scientific articles and books. From 2026 on he is among the artists illustrating the Handbook of the Reptiles of the World by Lynx Nature Books.

=== Examples of illustrations by Arthur Tiutenko ===
Plate 4 from Ceríaco et al. (2024) "The Trachylepis (Squamata: Scincidae) of Angola: an integrative taxonomic review with the description of seven new species."

Figure 8 from Marques et al. (2023) "A new species of African legless skink, genus Acontias Cuvier, 1816 "1817" (Squamata: Scincidae) from Serra da Neve inselberg, south-western Angola."

Figure 9 from Tiutenko et al. (2022) "Generic affinities of African house snakes revised: a new genus for Boodon erlangeri (Serpentes: Elapoidea: Lamprophiidae: Lamprophiinae)"

Figure 8 from Entiauspe-Neto et al. (2021) "A new species of Erythrolamprus (Serpentes: Dipsadidae: Xenodontini) from the savannas of northern South America."

Holaspis ngalangi - Figure 9 from Parrinha et al. (2025) "The genus Holaspis (Squamata: Lacertidae) in Angola: a tale of forgotten specimens and disappearing forests, with the description of a new species."

Clorosoma and Philodryas, unpublished paintings

Moloch horridus portrait, unpublished

Unpublished plate showing Bolyeria, Casarea, Xenodontophis

Tiutenko works sometimes with “traditional” techniques (i.e., of drawing on paper with pens, pencils and brushes), but more often, especially in big projects, he uses digital tools (computers and Wacom pen displays) and software, such as Corel Painter, Adobe Illustrator and Adobe Photoshop.
