= Ernő Csíki =

Hungarian entomologist

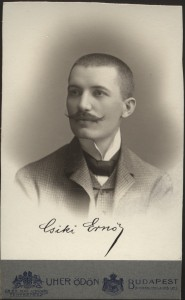
Ernő Csíki.

Ernst Csiki, Ernst Dietl or Ernő Csiki (Csíki) (Hungarian: Csiki (Csíki) Ernő) (22 October 1875 – 7 July 1954) was a Hungarian entomologist who specialised in Coleoptera.

Csiki was born as Ernst Dietl in Zsilvajdejvulka, Romania (today known as Vulcan), on 22 October 1875. He went on to study at the veterinary college in Budapest, Hungary, and graduated in 1897. He then joined the Hungarian Natural History Museum and worked as an assistant curator. In 1898, he changed his name to Hungarian as Csiki. He retired in 1933 as director but continued to work in entomology. He received a doctorate in 1953.

At the time of Ernő Csiki's retirement in 1932, the beetle collection contained over 1 million specimens, largely due to his purchases and his obtaining funding for expeditions. Csiki wrote several parts of Coleopterorum Catalogus and many papers on Carpathian Coleoptera.

Csiki died on 7 July 1954 in Budapest. A street in Budapest where he lived is called Bogár utca (beetle street) in his honour.
