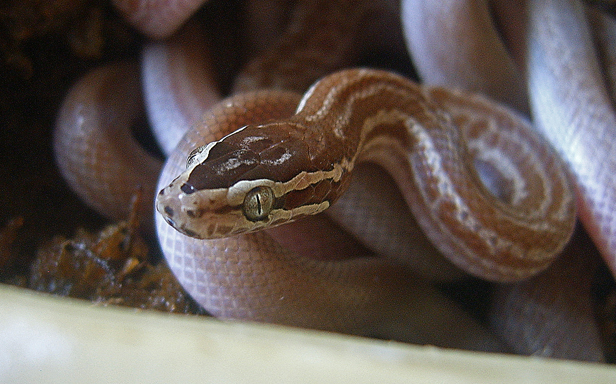
- Boaedon capensis

Scientific classification
- Kingdom: Animalia
- Phylum: Chordata
- Class: Reptilia
- Order: Squamata
- Suborder: Serpentes
- Superfamily: Elapoidea
- Family: Lamprophiidae; Fitzinger, 1843

Genera
- See text

= Lamprophiidae =

Family of snakes

The Lamprophiidae are a family of snakes found throughout Africa, including Seychelles. There are 89 species as of July 2022.

== Biology ==
Lamprophiids are a diverse group of snakes. Many are terrestrial but some are fossorial (e.g. Amblyodipsas) or semi-aquatic (e.g. Lycodonomorphus). Some are fast-moving (e.g. Psammophis) whereas others are slow (e.g. Duberria). They are found in deserts, grasslands, tropical forests, and mountains. They feed on mammals, birds, other reptiles, amphibians, fish, and invertebrates. Some species use constriction to subdue their prey (e.g. Boaedon). When other snake families were formerly included within the Lamprophiidae, they were considered even more diverse in biology, although this is now known to not be the case. Most species are oviparous.

== Classification ==
Most lamprophiids were historically considered to be members of the subfamily Lamprophiinae in the family Colubridae. The following classification follows Pyron et al., 2010, whose finding that lamprophiids are more closely related to elapids has been repeated by several other studies. Together these two groups are sometimes referred to as the Elapoidea. In fact, some studies have found that Elapidae is nested within Lamprophiidae, a finding that necessitated taxonomic changes to restore monophyly within Elapoidea. Following this, multiple subfamilies within Lamprophiidae were reclassified as their own families, reducing the number of species, overall distribution, and diversity in form of Lamprophiidae as previously defined; prior to this revision, members of Lamprophiidae were thought to be even more diverse in form and behavior, and were thought to have a distribution from Africa to Madagascar, southern Europe, and most of Asia. They are now known to be found in Africa and Seychelles.

== List of subfamilies and genera ==
- Lamprophiidae
  - Alopecion Duméril, 1853 - spotted house snake
  - Boaedon A.M.C. Duméril, Bibron & A.H.A. Duméril, 1854 - brown house snakes
  - Bofa Tiutenko, Koch, Pabijan, & Zinenko, 2022 - Ethiopian house snake
  - Bothrolycus Günther, 1874 - Günther's black snake
  - Bothrophthalmus W. Peters, 1863 - red-black striped snake
  - Chamaelycus Boulenger, 1919 - banded snakes
  - Dendrolycus Laurent, 1956 - Cameroon rainforest snake
  - Elaiophis Tiutenko, Maliuk & Koch, 2025 - African olive snakes
  - Gonionotophis Boulenger, 1893 - African ground snakes & file snakes
  - Gracililima Broadley, Tolley, Conradie, Wishart, Trape, Burger, Kusamba, Zassi-Boulou & Greenbaum, 2018 - Nyassa file snake
  - Hormonotus Hallowell, 1857 - Uganda house snake
  - Inyoka Kelly, Branch, Broadley, Barker & Villet, 2011 - Swazi rock snake
  - Lamprophis Fitzinger, 1843 - African house snakes
  - Limaformosa Broadley, Tolley, Conradie, Wishart, Trape, Burger, Kusamba, Zassi-Boulou, & Greenbaum, 2018 - file snakes
  - Lycodonomorphus Fitzinger, 1843 - African water snakes
  - Lycophidion Fitzinger, 1843 - wolf snakes
  - Mehelya Csíki, 1903 - file snakes
  - Montaspis Bourquin, 1991 - cream-spotted mountain snake
  - Pseudoboodon Peracca, 1897 - 'Ethiopian' snakes

=== Former subfamilies ===
These taxa were formerly classified in Lamprophiidae, but are now either classified as families of their own or subfamilies of other taxa.

- Subfamily Atractaspidinae (now Atractaspididae)
- Subfamily Cyclocorinae (now Cyclocoridae)
- Subfamily Prosymninae (now Prosymnidae)
- Subfamily Psammophiinae (now Psammophiidae)
- Subfamily Pseudaspidinae (now Pseudaspididae)
- Subfamily Pseudoxyrhophiinae (now Pseudoxyrhophiidae)
- Genus Buhoma (now incertae sedis within Elapoidea)

== In captivity ==
Some members of the Lamprophiidae, such as the African house snake (genus Boaedon) are kept and bred as pets by herpetoculturists. Due to their placid nature, classification as nonvenomous snakes, easy care requirements, and small size, many of the species that are bred in captivity are considered by many to be a perfect pet reptile for novices and experienced reptile keepers alike.
