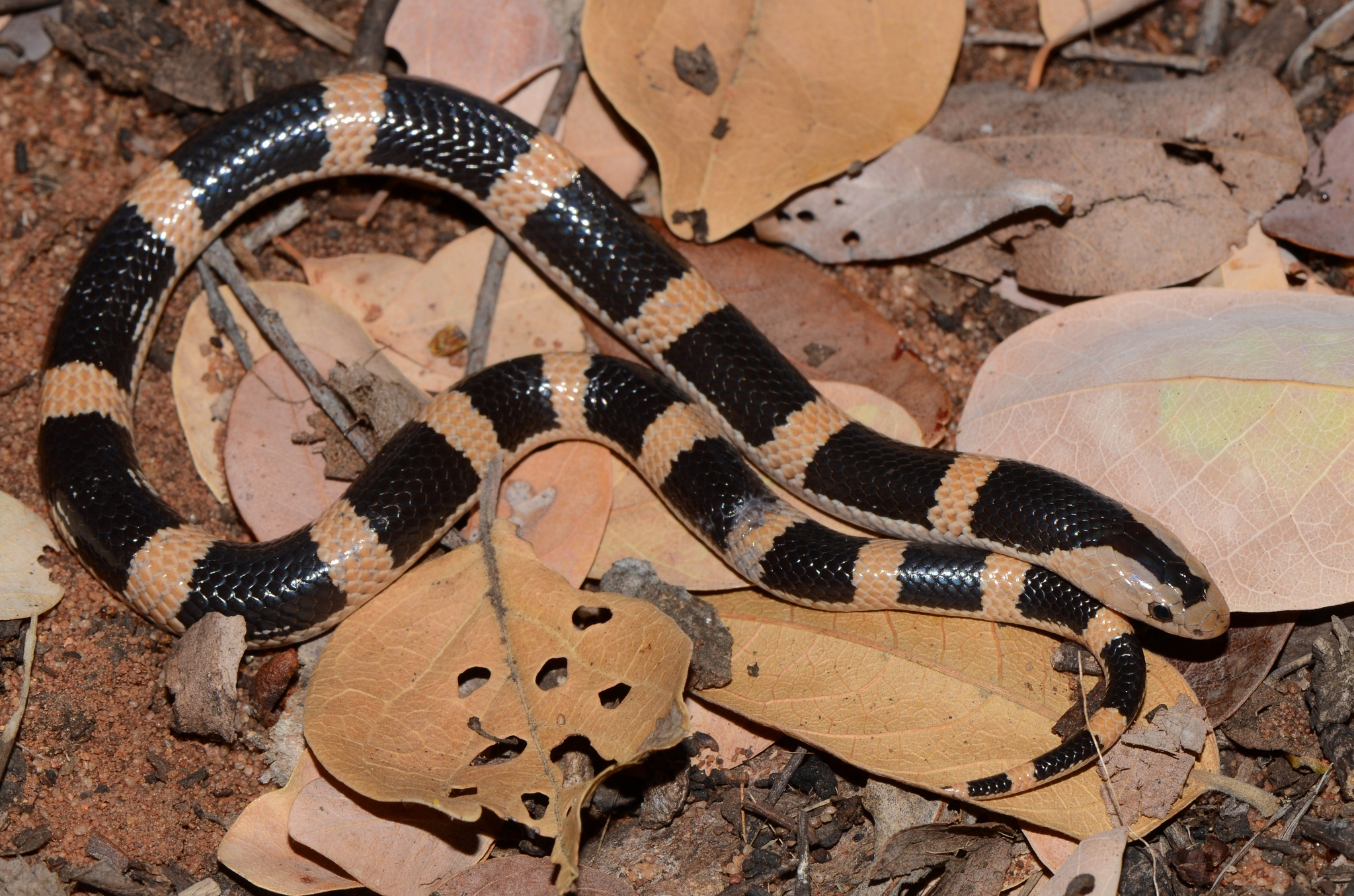
- Elapsoidea sundevallii
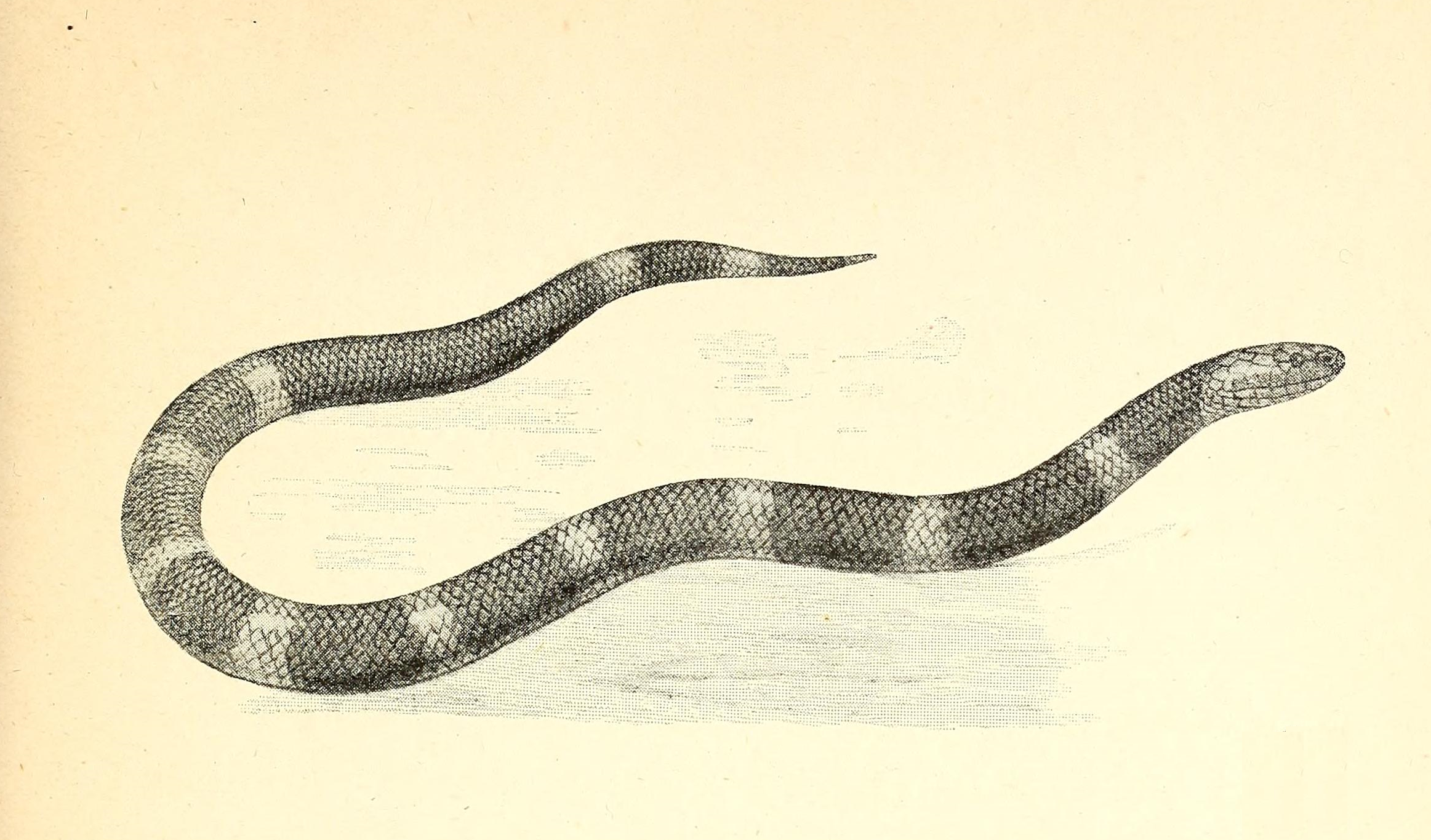
- Elapsoidea guentherii

Scientific classification
- Kingdom: Animalia
- Phylum: Chordata
- Class: Reptilia
- Order: Squamata
- Suborder: Serpentes
- Family: Elapidae
- Genus: Elapsoidea; Bocage, 1866
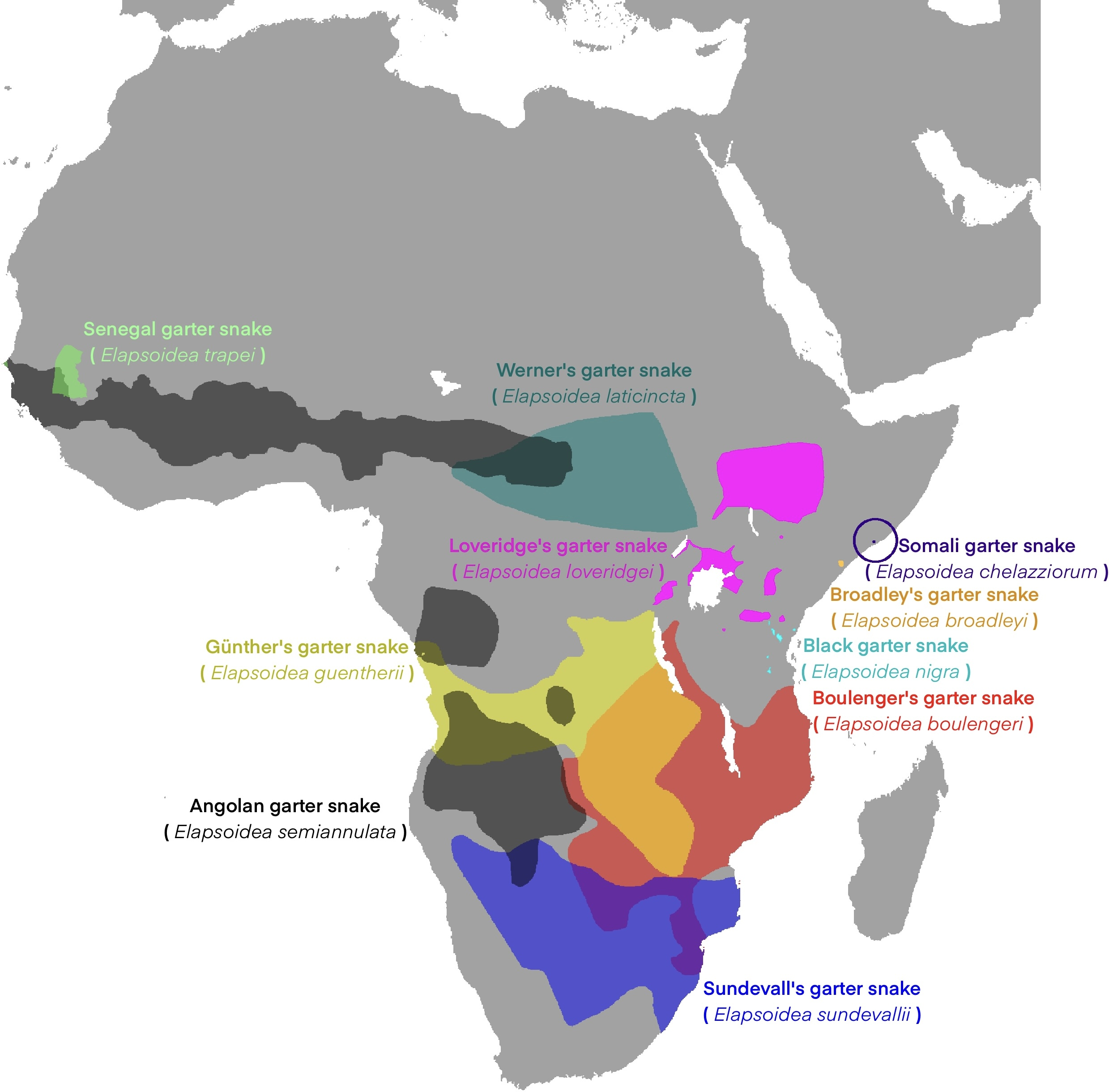

= Elapsoidea =

Genus of snakes

Elapsoidea is a genus of venomous snakes, commonly known as African garter snakes, in the family Elapidae. Despite their common names, they are only distantly related to the harmless North American garter snakes of the genus Thamnophis.

== Species ==
The following ten species are recognized as being valid.

- Elapsoidea boulengeri Boettger, 1895 – Boulenger's garter snake – Botswana, Malawi, Tanzania, Zambia, Zimbabwe
- Elapsoidea broadleyi Jakobsen, 1997 – Broadley's garter snake – Somalia
- Elapsoidea chelazziorum Lanza, 1979 – Somali garter snake – Somalia
- Elapsoidea guentherii Bocage, 1866 – Günther's garter snake – Angola, Cameroon, Democratic Republic of Congo, Republic of Congo, Zambia, Zimbabwe
- Elapsoidea laticincta (F. Werner, 1919) – Werner's garter snake – Cameroon, Chad, Central African Republic, Democratic Republic of Congo, Ethiopia, Sudan, Uganda
- Elapsoidea loveridgei Parker, 1949 – Loveridge's garter snake – Burundi, Democratic Republic of Congo, Ethiopia, Kenya, Rwanda, Sudan, Tanzania, Uganda
- Elapsoidea nigra Günther, 1888 – black garter snake – Tanzania
- Elapsoidea semiannulata Bocage, 1882 – Angolan garter snake – throughout central Africa
- Elapsoidea sundevallii (A. Smith, 1848) – Sundevall's garter snake – Botswana, Eswatini, Mozambique, Namibia, South Africa, Zimbabwe
- Elapsoidea trapei Mané, 1999 – Senegal garter snake – Senegal, Mauritania

Nota bene: A binomial authority in parentheses indicates that the species was originally described in a genus other than Elapsoidea.
