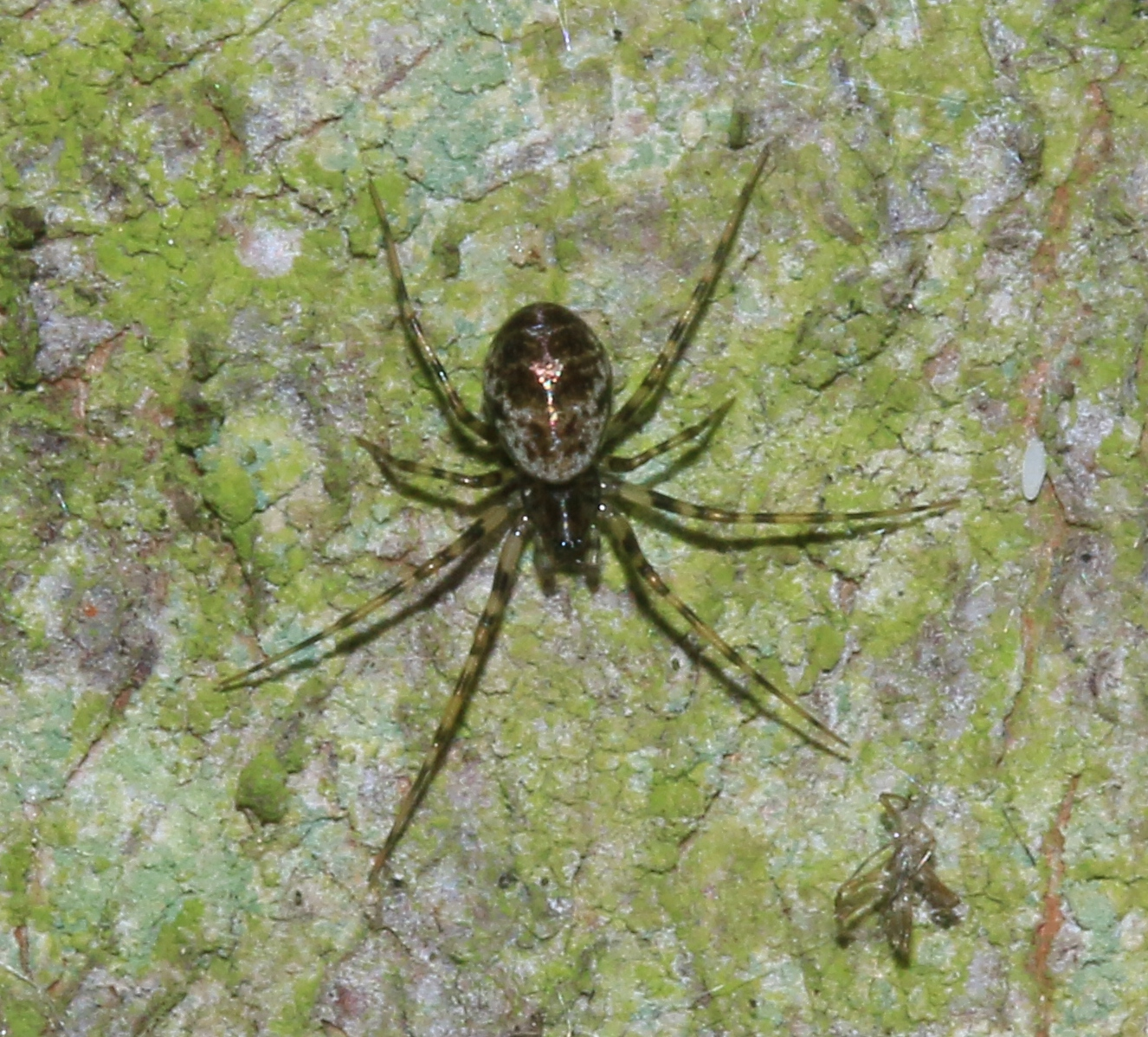
- D. socialis

Scientific classification
- Kingdom: Animalia
- Phylum: Arthropoda
- Subphylum: Chelicerata
- Class: Arachnida
- Order: Araneae
- Infraorder: Araneomorphae
- Family: Linyphiidae
- Genus: Drapetisca; Menge, 1866

Type species
- D. socialis (Sundevall, 1833)

Species
- 4, see text

= Drapetisca =

Genus of spiders

Drapetisca is a genus of dwarf spiders that was first described by Anton Menge in 1866. Females are 4 to 5 millimetres (0.16 to 0.20 in) long, and males are 3 to 4 millimetres (0.12 to 0.16 in) long. They are common on tree trunks from July to September, and they feed on insects and smaller spiders.

== Species ==
As of May 2019 it contains four species:

- Drapetisca alteranda Chamberlin, 1909 – USA
- Drapetisca bicruris Tu & Li, 2006 – China
- Drapetisca oteroana Gertsch, 1951 – USA
- Drapetisca socialis (Sundevall, 1833) (type) – Europe, Caucasus, Russia (Europe to Far East), Central Asia, China, Japan
