= Lycophidion hellmichi =

Conservation status
- Data Deficient (IUCN 3.1)

Scientific classification
- Kingdom: Animalia
- Phylum: Chordata
- Class: Reptilia
- Order: Squamata
- Suborder: Serpentes
- Family: Lamprophiidae
- Genus: Lycophidion
- Species: L. hellmichi

Binomial name
- Lycophidion hellmichi Laurent, 1964

Species of snake

Lycophidion hellmichi, known commonly as Hellmich's wolf snake or Kaokoveld wolf snake, is a species of oviparous, nonvenomous snake, in the family Lamprophiidae. The species is native to southern Africa.

== Geographic range ==
Lycophidion hellmichi is found in southwestern Angola and northwestern Namibia, though it is thought to have once had a larger geographic range that included the Democratic Republic of the Congo.

== Habitat ==
Lycophidion hellmichi favors rocky areas of savanna and shrubland, in the Namib Desert, at altitudes of 300–700 m (980–2,300 ft).

== Description ==
Lycophidion hellmichi has the following scalation. The first labial scale should be in contact with the postnasal scale(s). It has more than 190 ventral scales; with more than forty subcaudals in males, and more than thirty in females. Only one male specimen was collected, 6 km (3.7 mi) east of Etengua, Namibia. It was found to be 402 mm (15.8 in) in total length, from snout to tip of tail. The largest female, the holotype found in Kapolopopo, Angola, was 471 mm (18.5 in) in total length.

== Discovery ==
Laurent described L. hellmichi from "Kapolopopo, desert de Mossamedes " in 1964, and included L. c. capense (Hellmich 1957, Entre Rios) in the synonymy, which was the first record of the species in Angola. Laurent assigned a number of Namibian specimens to L. hellmichi in 1968, which Broadley later realized were a new species, L. namibianum. The only remaining Namibian specimen of L. hellmichi is from the Kaokoveld, and Broadley recorded another Angolan specimen from Quissange. It therefore appears to be known from only three specimens.

== Diet, behavior and longevity ==
Lycophidion hellmichi likely preys upon geckos, skinks, and other small lizards, which it kills by constriction. Its lifespan is likely between fifteen and twenty years.

== Etymology ==
Hellmich's wolf snake was named after Walter Hellmich (1906-1974), a prominent German zoologist.
