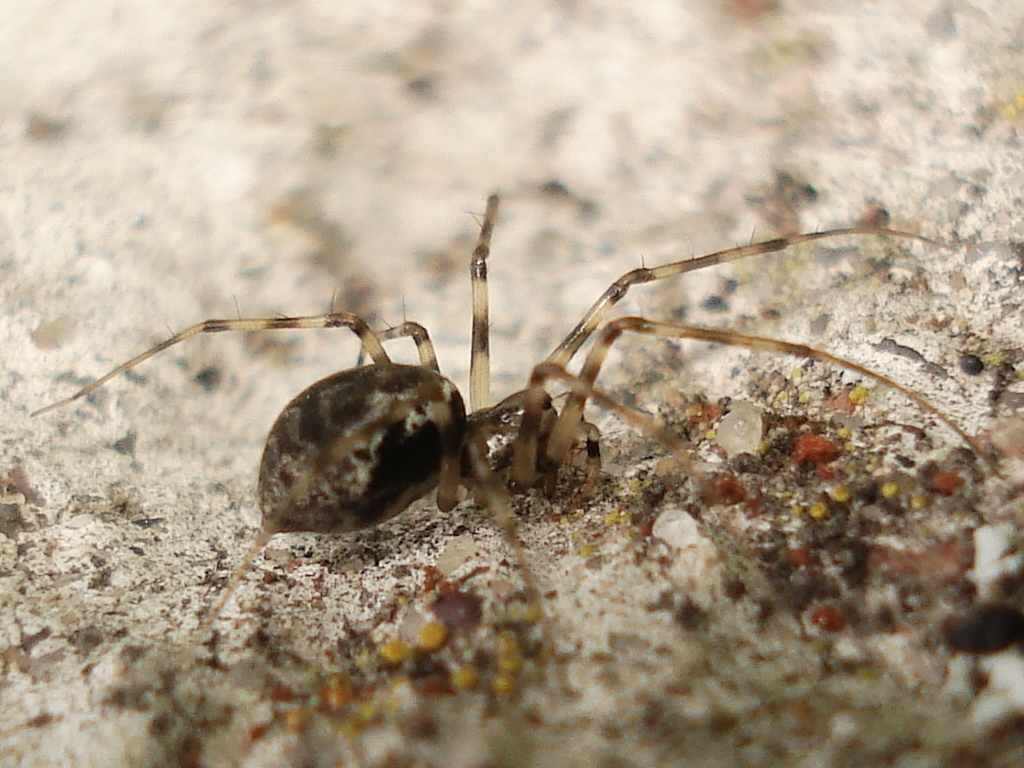

Scientific classification
- Kingdom: Animalia
- Phylum: Arthropoda
- Subphylum: Chelicerata
- Class: Arachnida
- Order: Araneae
- Infraorder: Araneomorphae
- Family: Linyphiidae
- Genus: Drapetisca
- Species: D. socialis

Binomial name
- Drapetisca socialis (Sundevall, 1833)

Synonyms
- Linyphia socialis Linyphia annulipes Linyphia tigrina Linyphia sepium Meta tigrina

= Drapetisca socialis =

Species of spider

Drapetisca socialis is a species of spider belonging to the family Linyphiidae. It is distributed across most of the Palearctic region.

Even among the diminutive spiders in this family, this is a very small species with a body length (excluding legs) of just 3 mm. It is usually found motionless on its delicate web, built on the trunk of a tree, where its mottled body and banded legs, allied to its tiny size, make it very difficult to see (giving it the common name invisible spider).

This species of spider weaves webs made of silk so fine that it seems invisible; it can only be seen if the light falls on it at the right angle. As a result of this 'invisible' web, it appears that the spider is resting on tree trunks – in reality, all 8 legs are resting on its web. The species of spider is found widely distributed throughout Britain and other areas of Northern Europe.

== Sources ==
- Preston-Mafham, Ken (1998). Spiders: Compact Study Guide and Identifier. Angus Books. ISBN 978-1-904594-93-2.
- Platnick, Norman I. (2008): The world spider catalog, version 8.5. American Museum of Natural History.
