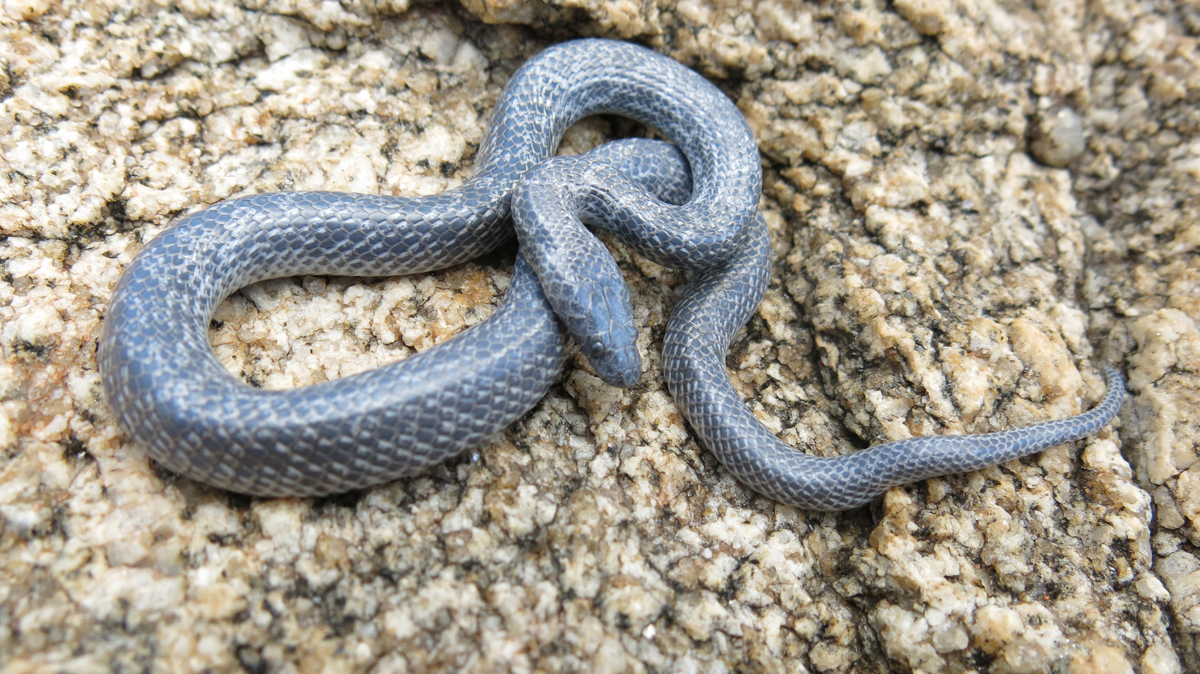
- Lycophidion variegatum

Scientific classification
- Domain: Eukaryota
- Kingdom: Animalia
- Phylum: Chordata
- Class: Reptilia
- Order: Squamata
- Suborder: Serpentes
- Family: Lamprophiidae
- Subfamily: Lamprophiinae
- Genus: Lycophidion; Fitzinger, 1843

Species
- 23 species, see text.

= Lycophidion =

Genus of snakes

Lycophidion is a genus of nonvenomous lamprophiid snakes commonly referred to as the wolf snakes.

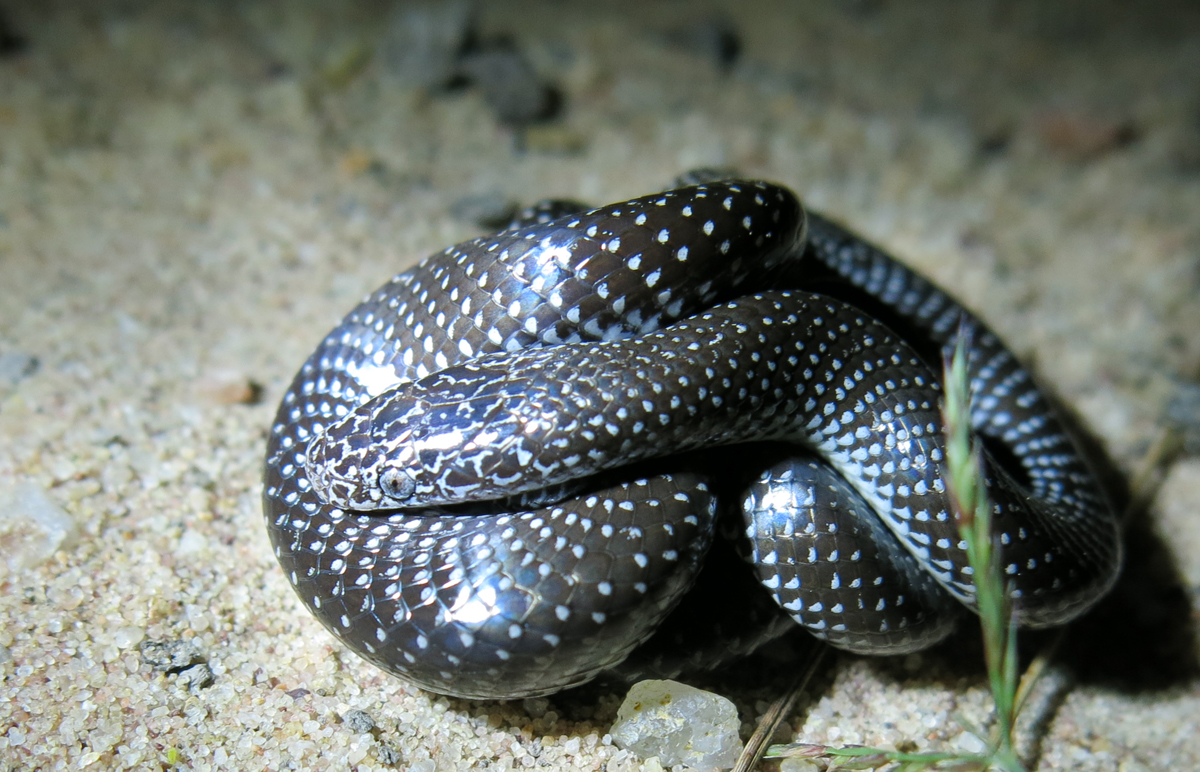
Lycophidion capense, cape wolf snake, Waterberg, Limpopo.

As of 2015 there are 23 recognized species in the genus.

== Description and behavior ==
Wolf snakes are small snakes which forage at night for sleeping lizards. They have flat heads and large recurved teeth that are assumed to aid them in their extraction of lizards from their lairs.

== Reproduction ==
All species in the genus Lycophidion are oviparous and lay between 3 and 10 eggs.

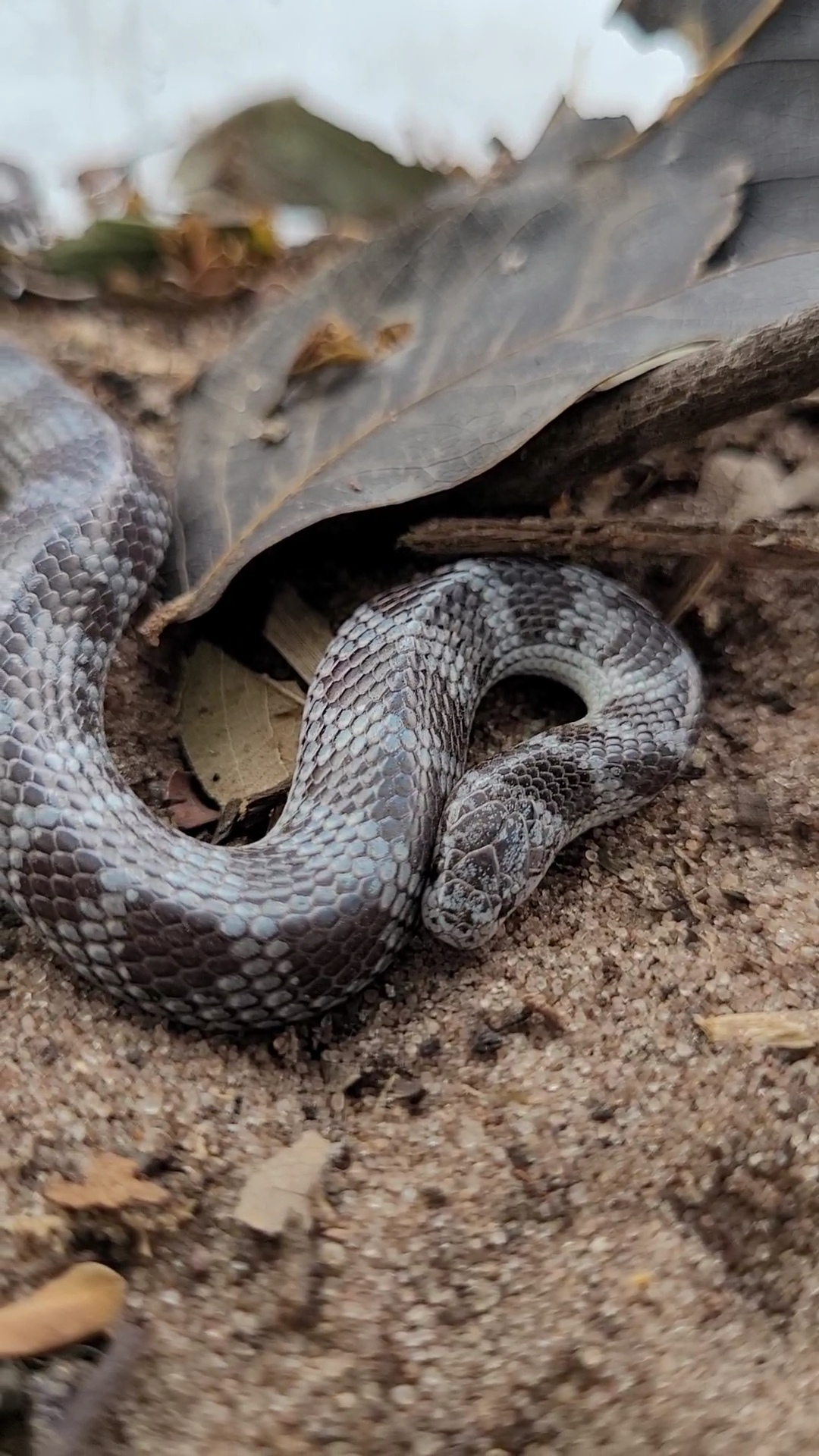
Lycophidion multimaculatum, the Spotted Wolf Snake, from Northern Namibia/Southwestern Zambia

== Species ==
The following species are recognized as being valid.

- Lycophidion acutirostre Günther, 1868
- Lycophidion albomaculatum Steindachner, 1870
- Lycophidion capense (A. Smith, 1831)
- Lycophidion chirioi J.-F. Trape, 2021
- Lycophidion depressirostre Laurent, 1968
- Lycophidion hellmichi Laurent, 1964
- Lycophidion irroratum (Leach, 1819)
- Lycophidion jacksoni (Boulenger, 1893) – western Jackson's wolf snake
- Lycophidion laterale Hallowell, 1857
- Lycophidion meleagre Boulenger, 1893
- Lycophidion multimaculatum Boettger, 1888
- Lycophidion namibianum Broadley, 1991
- Lycophidion nanum (Broadley, 1958)
- Lycophidion nigromaculatum (W. Peters, 1863)
- Lycophidion ornatum Parker, 1936
- Lycophidion pembanum Laurent,1968
- Lycophidion pygmaeum Broadley, 1996
- Lycophidion semiannule W. Peters, 1854
- Lycophidion semicinctum A.M.C. Duméril, Bibron & A.H.A. Duméril, 1854
- Lycophidion taylori Broadley & Hughes, 1993
- Lycophidion tchadensis J.-F. Trape, 2021 – Chad wolf snake
- Lycophidion uzungwense Loveridge, 1932
- Lycophidion variegatum Broadley, 1969

Nota bene: A binomial authority in parentheses indicates that the species was originally described in a genus other than Lycophidion.
