= Elapsoidea trapei =

Conservation status
- Least Concern (IUCN 3.1)

Scientific classification
- Kingdom: Animalia
- Phylum: Chordata
- Class: Reptilia
- Order: Squamata
- Suborder: Serpentes
- Family: Elapidae
- Genus: Elapsoidea
- Species: E. trapei

Binomial name
- Elapsoidea trapei Mané, 1999
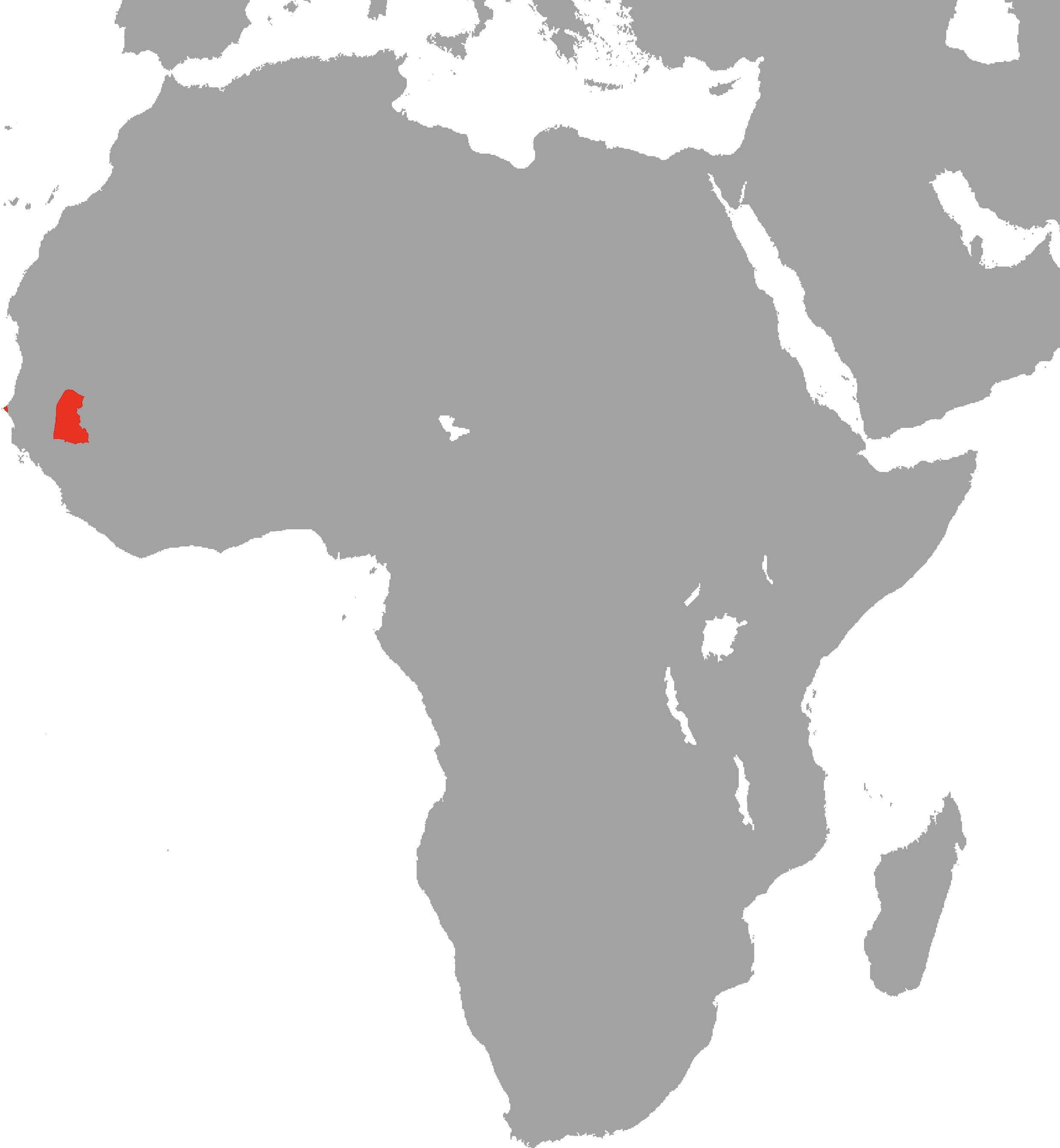

Species of snake

Elapsoidea trapei is a species of snake of the family Elapidae.

The snake is found in Senegal and Mauritania.
