= Elapsoidea semiannulata =

Conservation status
- Least Concern (IUCN 3.1)

Scientific classification
- Kingdom: Animalia
- Phylum: Chordata
- Class: Reptilia
- Order: Squamata
- Suborder: Serpentes
- Family: Elapidae
- Genus: Elapsoidea
- Species: E. semiannulata

Binomial name
- Elapsoidea semiannulata Bocage, 1882
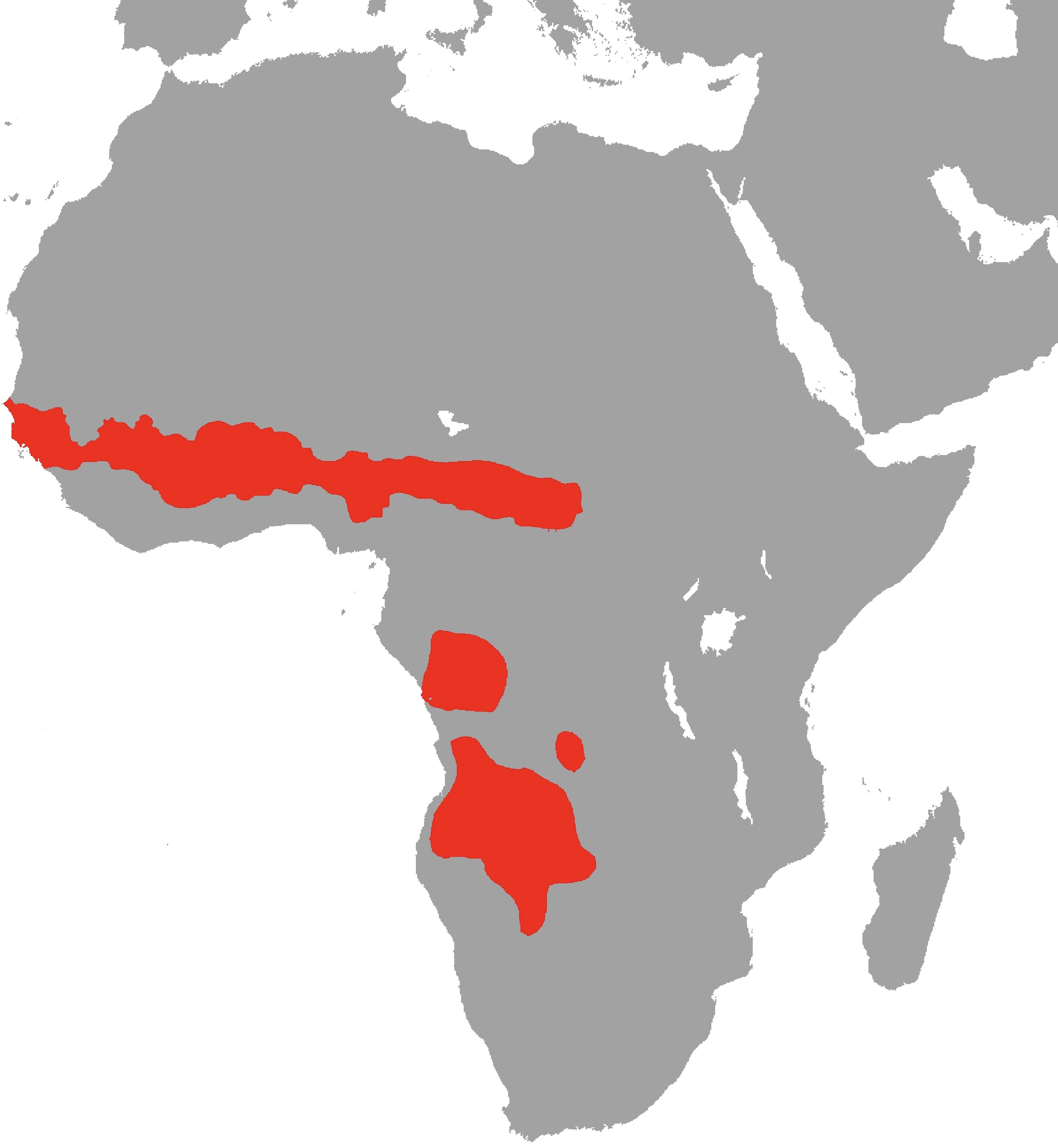

Species of snake

Elapsoidea semiannulata, the Angolan garter snake, is a species of snake of the family Elapidae.

The snake is found in central Africa.
