= Lycophidion irroratum =

Scientific classification
- Kingdom: Animalia
- Phylum: Chordata
- Class: Reptilia
- Order: Squamata
- Suborder: Serpentes
- Family: Lamprophiidae
- Genus: Lycophidion
- Species: L. irroratum

Binomial name
- Lycophidion irroratum (Leach, 1819)

Synonyms
- Coluber irroratus Leach, 1819

Species of snake

Lycophidion irroratum is a species of snake in the family Lamprophiidae. It is commonly known as a Leach's wolf snake or pale wolf snake. It occurs in West Africa, Cameroon, the Central African Republic, and northern Democratic Republic of the Congo.
