= Elapsoidea nigra =

Black garter snake

Conservation status
- Least Concern (IUCN 3.1)

Scientific classification
- Kingdom: Animalia
- Phylum: Chordata
- Class: Reptilia
- Order: Squamata
- Suborder: Serpentes
- Family: Elapidae
- Genus: Elapsoidea
- Species: E. nigra

Binomial name
- Elapsoidea nigra Günther, 1888
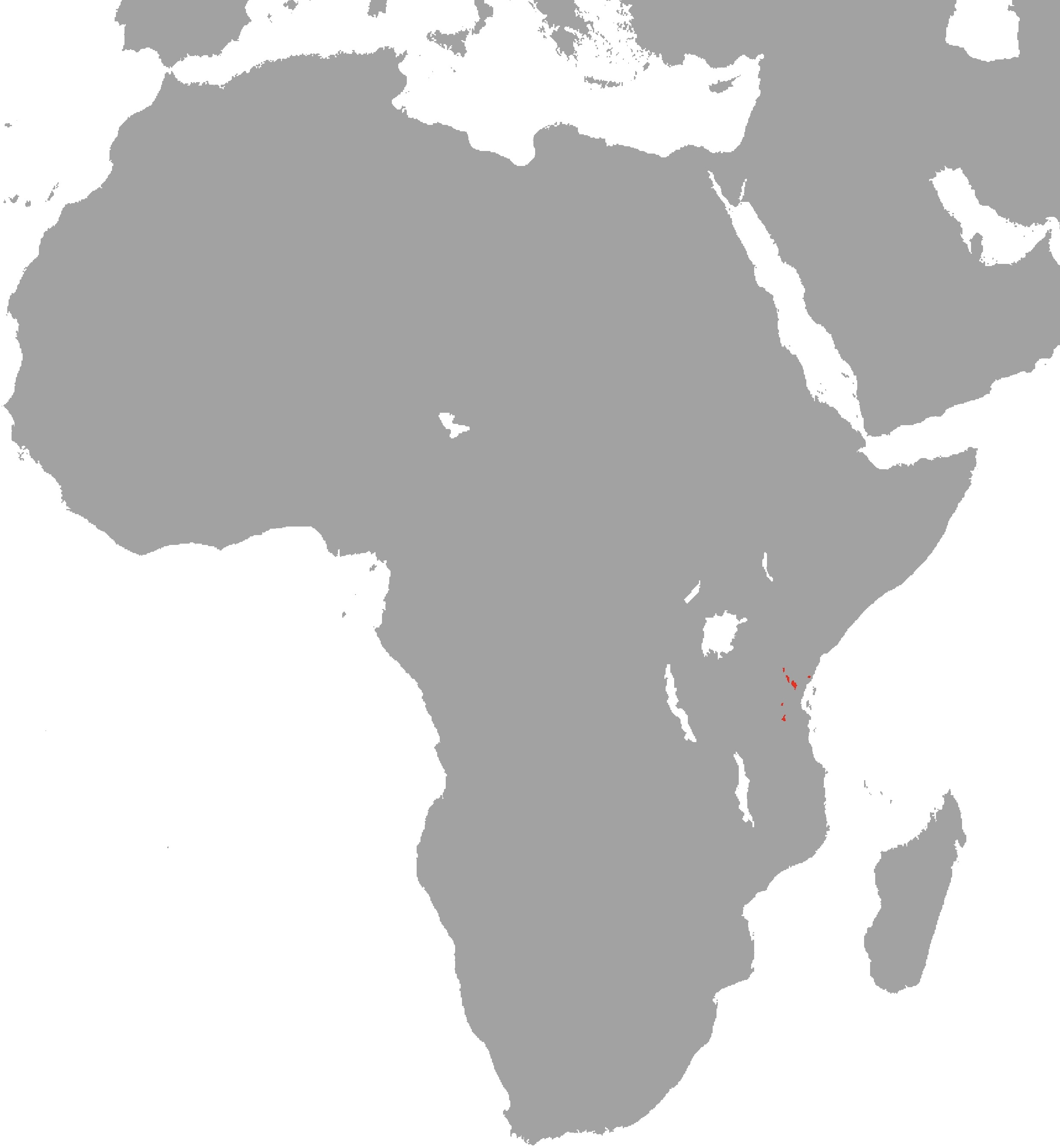

Species of snake

Elapsoidea nigra, also known commonly as the black garter snake or Usambara garter snake, is a species of venomous snake in the family Elapidae. It is found in northeastern Tanzania and southeastern Kenya. It is a terrestrial and fossorial snake that inhabits moist evergreen forest at elevations of 300–1,900 m (980–6,230 ft) above sea level.

In 2009 the IUCN Red List of Threatened Species initially rated the species as endangered. In 2014, its status was updated to "least concern".
