= Elapsoidea guentherii =

Conservation status
- Least Concern (IUCN 3.1)

Scientific classification
- Kingdom: Animalia
- Phylum: Chordata
- Class: Reptilia
- Order: Squamata
- Suborder: Serpentes
- Family: Elapidae
- Genus: Elapsoidea
- Species: E. guentherii

Binomial name
- Elapsoidea guentherii Bocage, 1866
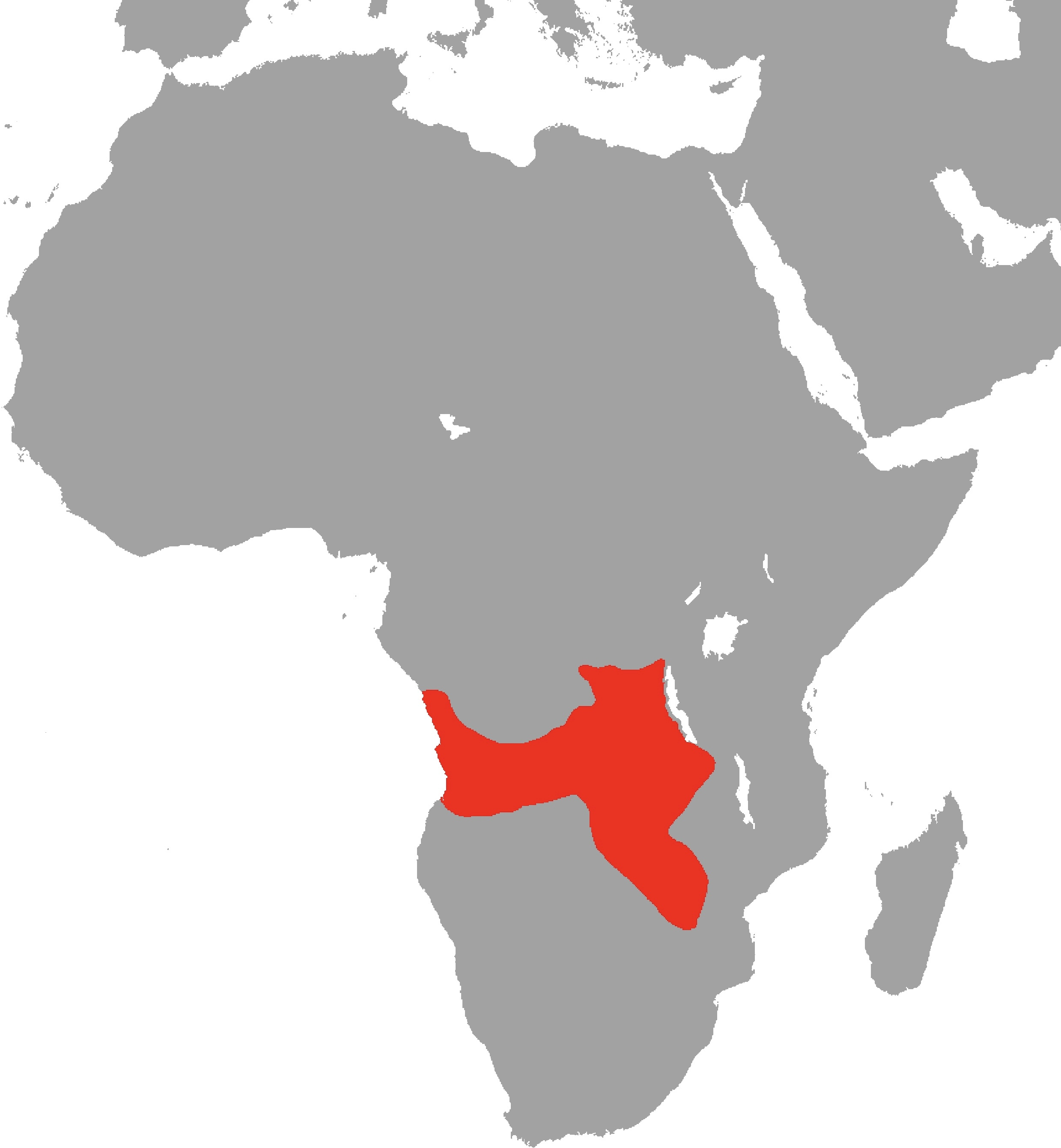

Synonyms
- Elapsoidea Guntherii Bocage, 1866; Elapsoidea hessei Boettger, 1887; Elapsoidea guentheri — Günther, 1895; Elapechis guentheri — Boulenger, 1896; Elapsoidea sundevallii güntherii — Loveridge, 1944; Elapsoidea guentherii — Welch, 1994

Species of snake

Elapsoidea guentherii, also known commonly as Günther's garter snake, is a species of venomous snake in the family Elapidae. The species is native to Central Africa.

== Etymology ==
The specific name, guentherii, is in honor of German-British herpetologist Albert Günther.

== Geographic range ==
E. guentherii is found in Angola, Democratic Republic of the Congo, Zambia, and Zimbabwe.

== Habitat ==
The preferred natural habitat of E. guentherii is savanna, at altitudes from sea level to 1,500 m (4,900 ft).

== Description ==
E. guentherii exhibits sexual dimorphism with males being significantly larger than females. Males may attain a snout-to-vent length (SVL) of 56 cm (22 in), but females only grow to 38.5 cm (15.2 in) SVL. Juveniles have a dorsal color pattern of alternating black and white crossbands of equal width. The pattern fades as the snakes mature, with adults becoming uniformly grayish black dorsally, and lighter gray ventrally.

== Venom ==
E. guentherii is venomous, but no human fatalities have been reported.

== Diet ==
E. guentherii preys predominately upon reptiles such as lizards and snakes, but it will also eat amphibians and termites.

== Reproduction ==
E. guentherii is oviparous. In late summer an adult female may lay a clutch of as many as ten eggs.
