= Elapsoidea loveridgei =

Conservation status
- Least Concern (IUCN 3.1)

Scientific classification
- Kingdom: Animalia
- Phylum: Chordata
- Class: Reptilia
- Order: Squamata
- Suborder: Serpentes
- Family: Elapidae
- Genus: Elapsoidea
- Species: E. loveridgei

Binomial name
- Elapsoidea loveridgei H. Parker, 1949
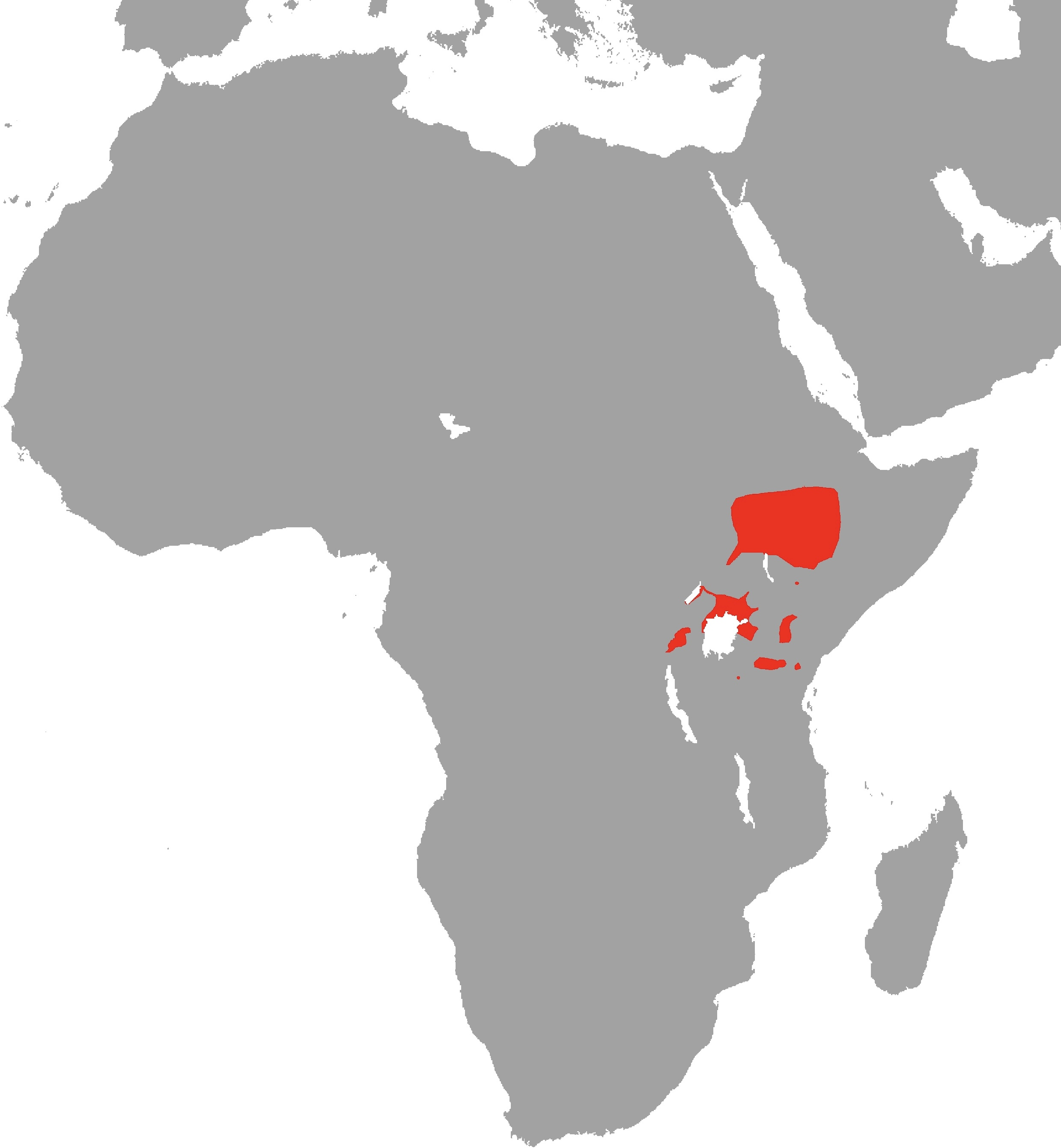
- Geographic range of Elapsoidea loveridgei (in red)

Synonyms
- Elapsoidea sundevallii loveridgei H. Parker, 1949

Species of snake

Elapsoidea loveridgei, also known commonly as Loveridge's garter snake and the East African garter snake, is a species of venomous snake in the family Elapidae. The species is native to East Africa. There are three recognized subspecies.

== Etymology ==
The specific name, loveridgei, is in honor of herpetologist Arthur Loveridge.

== Description ==
Adults of Elapsoidea loveridgei usually have a total length (tail included) of 30–55 cm (12–22 in). However, it may attain a total length of 65 cm (26 in). The tail is short, about 7.5% of the total length. The dorsal scales, which are smooth and glossy, are arranged in 13 rows at midbody. The coloration is black with light crossbands, which may be white, yellow, pink, or red.

== Geographic range ==
Elapsoidea loveridgei is found in Burundi, Democratic Republic of the Congo, Ethiopia, Kenya, Rwanda, South Sudan, Uganda, and Tanzania.

== Habitat ==
The preferred natural habitats of Elapsoidea loveridgei are woodland, savanna, and grassland, at altitudes of 600–2,200 m (2,000–7,200 ft).

== Behavior ==
Elapsoidea loveridgei is terrestrial and nocturnal.

== Defensive behavior ==
If threatened, Elapsoidea loveridgei inflates and flattens its body, making the bright-colored crossbands more prominent. It may also raise the anterior half of the body and move it abruptly from side to side.

== Diet ==
Elapsoidea loveridgei preys upon small frogs, lizards, snakes, and mammals, and also eats reptile eggs.

== Reproduction ==
Elapsoidea loveridgei is oviparous.

== Venom ==
Elapsoidea loveridgei is venomous. In humans, its bite causes local pain and swelling, plus pain and swelling in the lymph nodes. There is no antivenom for species of the genus Elapsoidea, but no human fatalities have been recorded.

== Subspecies ==
The following three subspecies are recognized as being valid, including the nominotypical subspecies.

- Elapsoidea loveridgei colleti Laurent, 1956
- Elapsoidea loveridgei loveridgei H. Parker, 1949
- Elapsoidea loveridgei multicincta Laurent, 1956
