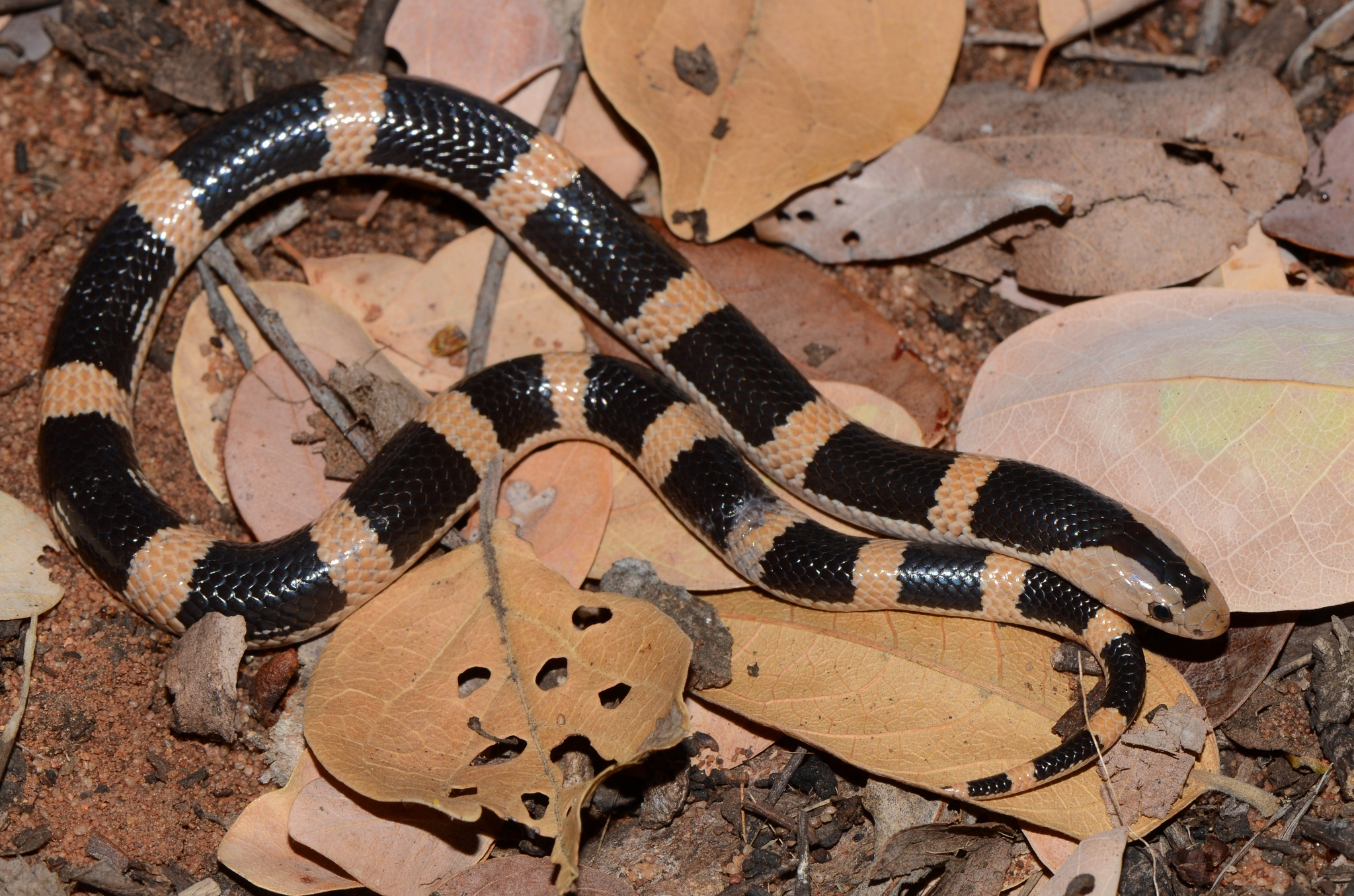

Conservation status
- Least Concern (IUCN 3.1)

Scientific classification
- Kingdom: Animalia
- Phylum: Chordata
- Class: Reptilia
- Order: Squamata
- Suborder: Serpentes
- Family: Elapidae
- Genus: Elapsoidea
- Species: E. sundevallii

Binomial name
- Elapsoidea sundevallii (A. Smith, 1848)
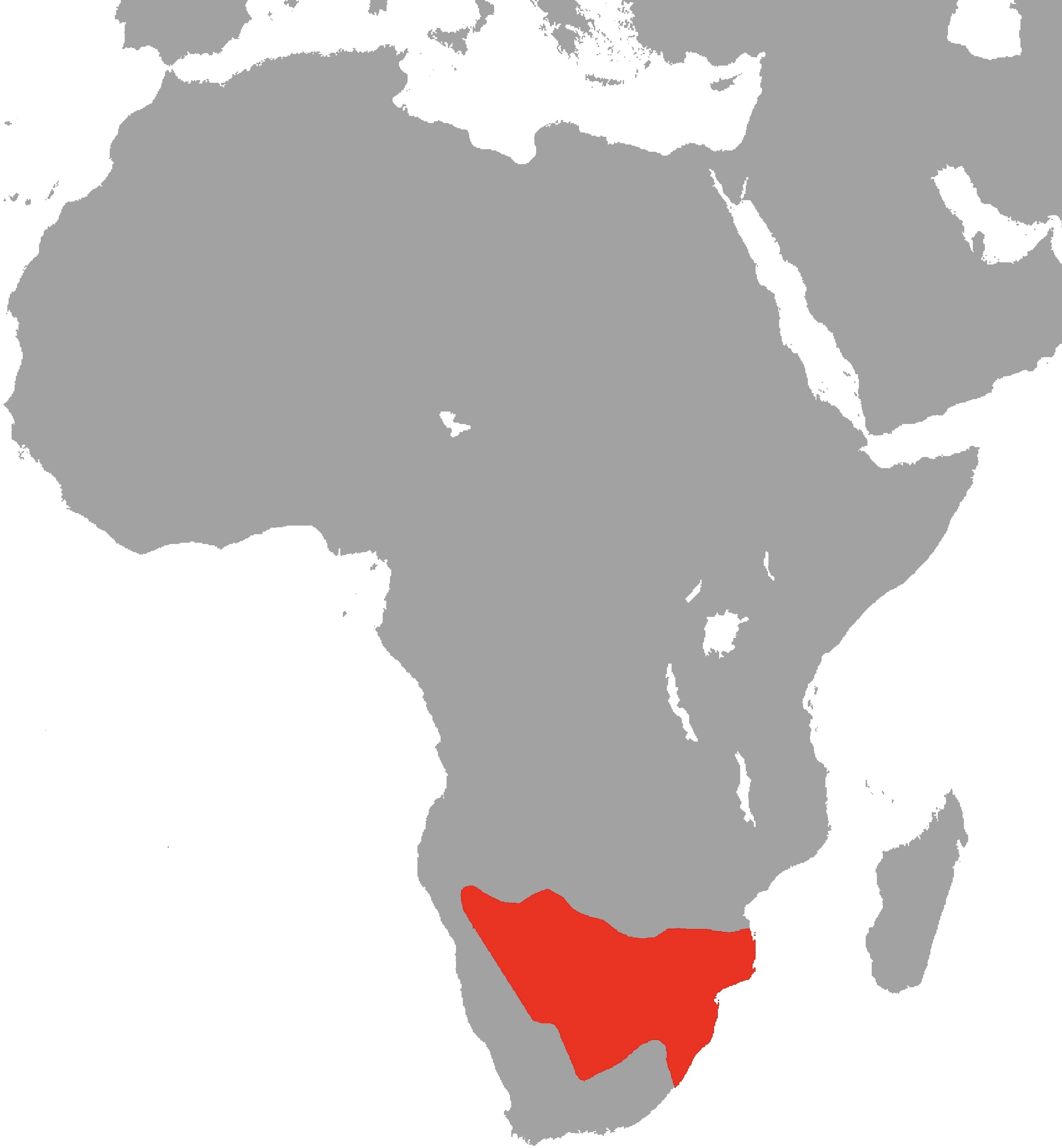

Synonyms
- Elaps sunderwallii [sic] A. Smith, 1848; Elapsoidea sundevallii — W. Peters, 1880; Elapechis sundevallii — Boulenger, 1896; Elapsoidea sundevallii — Loveridge, 1944

= Elapsoidea sundevallii =

Species of African snake

Elapsoidea sundevallii, also known commonly as Sundevall's garter snake or the African garter snake, is a species of venomous snake in the family Elapidae. The species is native to Southern Africa. There are five recognised subspecies.

== Etymology ==
The specific epithet, sundevalli, honours Swedish zoologist Carl Jakob Sundevall (1801–1875).

The subspecific name, decosteri, is in honour of Belgian consul Juste De Coster, who collected natural history specimens at Delagoa Bay, Mozambique.

The subspecific name, fitzsimonsi, is in honour of South African herpetologist Vivian Frederick Maynard FitzSimons.

== Geographic range ==
E. sundevallii is found in Botswana, Eswatini, Mozambique, Namibia, South Africa, and Zimbabwe.

== Habitat ==
The preferred natural habitats of E. sundevallii are grassland, shrubland, savanna, and forest, at altitudes from sea level to 1,800 m (5,900 ft).

== Description ==
Adults of E. sundevallii are slate-grey to black or dark brown on the upper body, with whitish to pinkish bellies. Juveniles are banded.

Males grow to be longer than females. The maximum recorded snout-to-vent length (SVL) for a male is 93 cm (37 in). The maximum recorded SVL for a female is only 65 cm (26 in).

== Diet ==
E. sundevallii preys upon frogs, lizards and their eggs, snakes, moles, and rodents.

== Venom ==
Although E. sundevallii is venomous and can inflict a serious bite, few bites have been recorded, and none has resulted in a human fatality. Symptoms may include pain and swelling, nausea and vomiting, blurred vision, and loss of consciousness.

== Reproduction ==
The species E. sundevallii is oviparous. A sexually mature female may lay a clutch of as many as 10 eggs.

== Subspecies ==
The following five subspecies, including the nominotypical subspecies, are recognised as being valid.

- Elapsoidea sundevallii decosteri Boulenger, 1888
- Elapsoidea sundevallii fitzsimonsi Loveridge, 1944
- Elapsoidea sundevallii longicauda Broadley, 1971
- Elapsoidea sundevallii media Broadley, 1971
- Elapsoidea sundevallii sundevallii (A. Smith, 1848)

Nota bene: A trinomial authority in parentheses indicates that the subspecies was originally described in a genus other than Elapsoidea.
