= Elapsoidea chelazziorum =

Conservation status
- Data Deficient (IUCN 3.1)

Scientific classification
- Kingdom: Animalia
- Phylum: Chordata
- Class: Reptilia
- Order: Squamata
- Suborder: Serpentes
- Family: Elapidae
- Genus: Elapsoidea
- Species: E. chelazziorum

Binomial name
- Elapsoidea chelazziorum Lanza, 1979
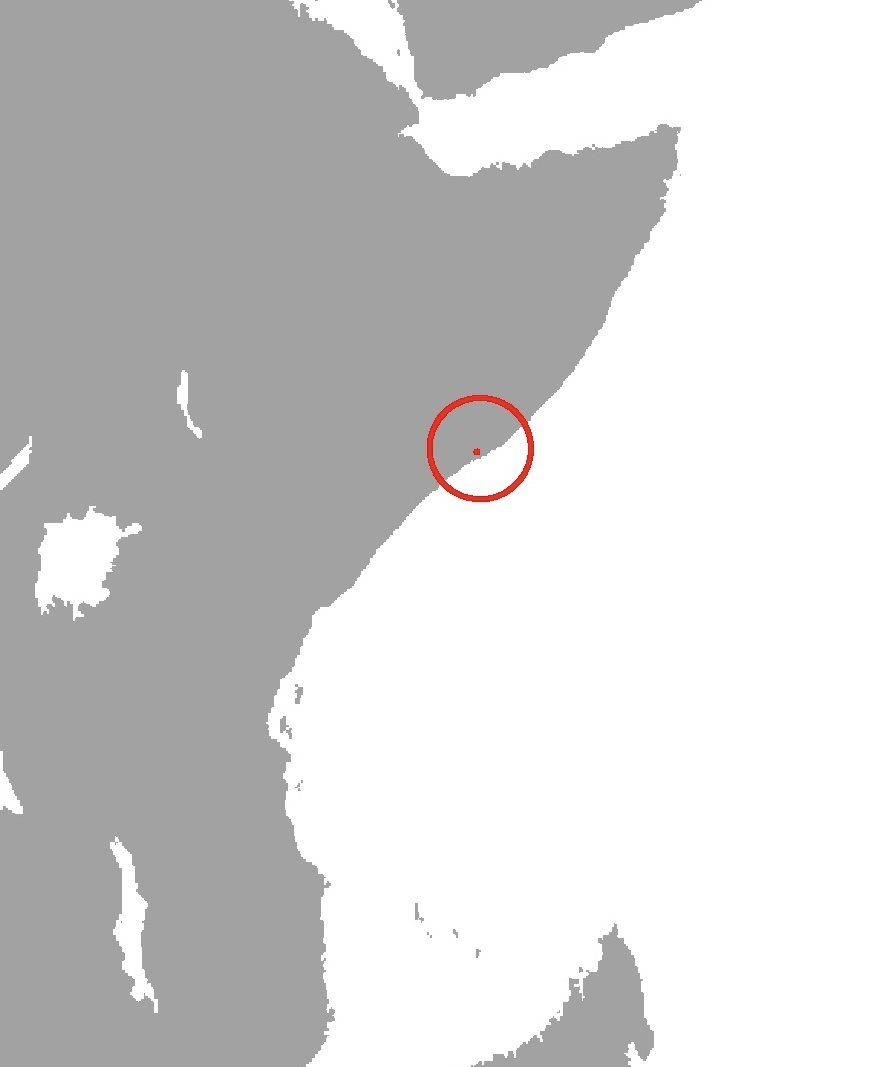

Species of snake

Elapsoidea chelazziorum, the Somali garter snake, is a species of snake of the family Elapidae.

The snake is found in Somalia.
