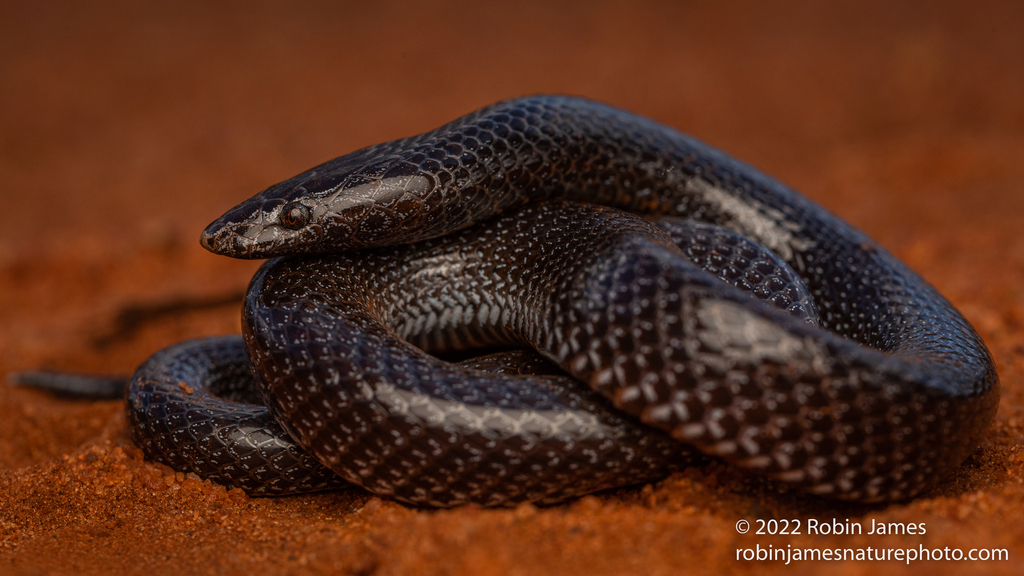
- A flat-snouted wolf snake in Voi, Kenya

Conservation status
- Least Concern (IUCN 3.1)

Scientific classification
- Kingdom: Animalia
- Phylum: Chordata
- Class: Reptilia
- Order: Squamata
- Suborder: Serpentes
- Family: Lamprophiidae
- Genus: Lycophidion
- Species: L. depressirostre

Binomial name
- Lycophidion depressirostre Laurent, 1968

= Lycophidion depressirostre =

Species of snake

Lycophidion depressirostre, commonly known as the flat-snouted wolf snake, is a rare species of oviparous, nonvenomous snake in the family Lamprophiidae. It is found in southern Sudan, the Central African Republic, Somalia, Kenya, Tanzania, Uganda, and Southern Ethiopia.

== Description ==
This small snake appears dark brown, dark grey, or black. It has a round snout with an ill-defined pale band that breaks behind the eye. The head tends to be a lighter red-brown compared to the rest of the body. They may be meagerly stippled with white at the distal half of each dorsal scale, but the ventrum is uniformly dark. The only exceptions may be some pale stippling on the chin and lateral sides of the ventral scales.

They can reach a maximum length of 332 millimetres (13.1 in) in males and 448 millimetres (17.6 in) in females. As their namesake suggests, they have a very elongate skull, with strongly developed and smoothly curved parietal crests which merge posteriorly.

=== Misidentifications and differentiation ===
They are frequently misidentified as others in Lycophidion, but there are ways to differentiate.

Lycophidion depressirostre has a single apical pit on its dorsal scales, unlike L. irroratum, which has paired apical pits. The first labial scale is in contact with the postnasal scale, unlike L. ornatum. Dorsal scales with white stippling only across the apex; consistent stippling on lower laterals; and no white blotch or collar on the neck indicates that it is a flat-snouted wolf snake.

Lycophidion taylori can look incredibly similar to L. depressirostre, but can be differentiated using their teeth. Flat-snouted wolf snakes have significantly more posterior maxillary teeth (8 to 9 + 19 to 24) compared to others in Lycophidion (7 to 8 + 11 to 18).

== Behaviour ==
Like other snakes in Lycophidion, the flat-snouted wolf snake is a nocturnal hunter primarily preying upon lizards, which are constricted to death. Their lifespan is between fifteen and twenty years.
