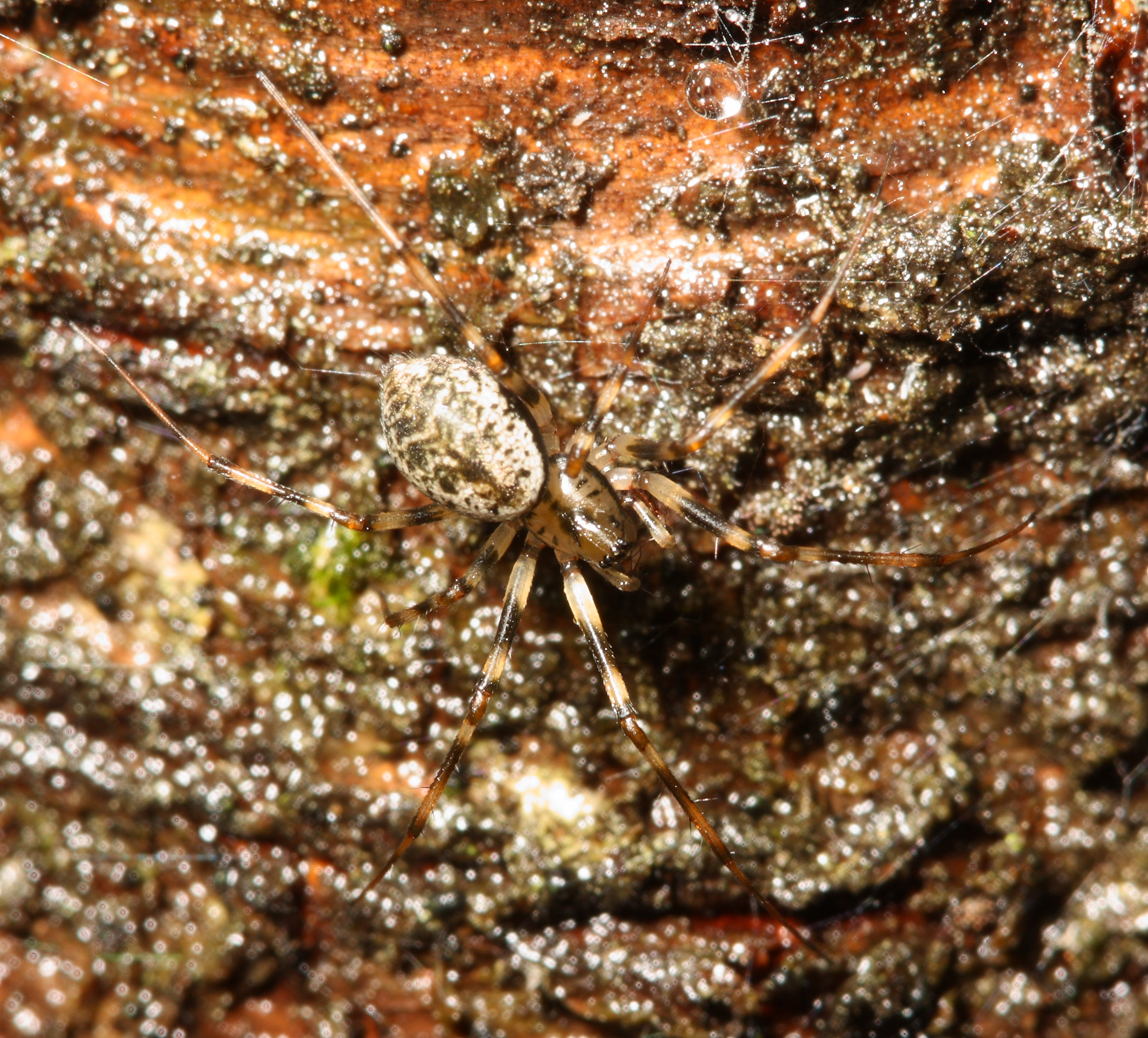

Conservation status
- Secure (NatureServe)

Scientific classification
- Kingdom: Animalia
- Phylum: Arthropoda
- Subphylum: Chelicerata
- Class: Arachnida
- Order: Araneae
- Infraorder: Araneomorphae
- Family: Linyphiidae
- Genus: Drapetisca
- Species: D. alteranda

Binomial name
- Drapetisca alteranda Chamberlin, 1909

= Drapetisca alteranda =

Species of spider

Drapetisca alteranda is a spider in the family Linyphiidae. It is found in the United States. This species can be found in leaves on the ground; however, it is most often found on the surface of various deciduous and coniferous trees.
