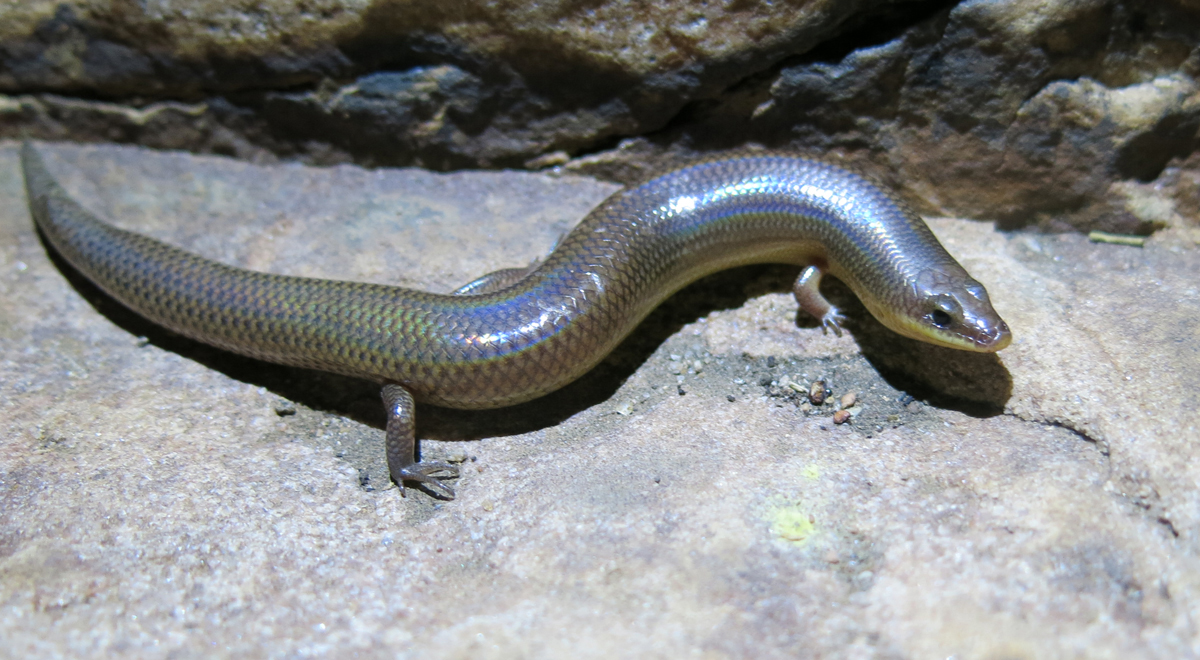

Conservation status
- Least Concern (IUCN 3.1)

Scientific classification
- Kingdom: Animalia
- Phylum: Chordata
- Class: Reptilia
- Order: Squamata
- Family: Scincidae
- Genus: Mochlus
- Species: M. sundevallii

Binomial name
- Mochlus sundevallii (A. Smith, 1849)

Synonyms
- Eumeces (Riopa) sundevallii A. Smith, 1849; Eumeces afer W. Peters, 1854; Lygosoma sundevalli — Calabresi, 1915; Riopa sundevalli — M.A. Smith, 1937; Mochlus sundevalli — Mittleman, 1952; Mochlus sundevallii — Freitas et al., 2019

= Mochlus sundevallii =

Species of lizard

Mochlus sundevallii, also known commonly as Peters' eyelid skink, Peters' writhing skink, and Sundevall's writhing skink, is a species of lizard in the family Scincidae. The species is endemic to Sub-Saharan Africa.

== Etymology ==
The specific name, sundevallii, is in honor of Swedish zoologist Carl Jakob Sundevall.

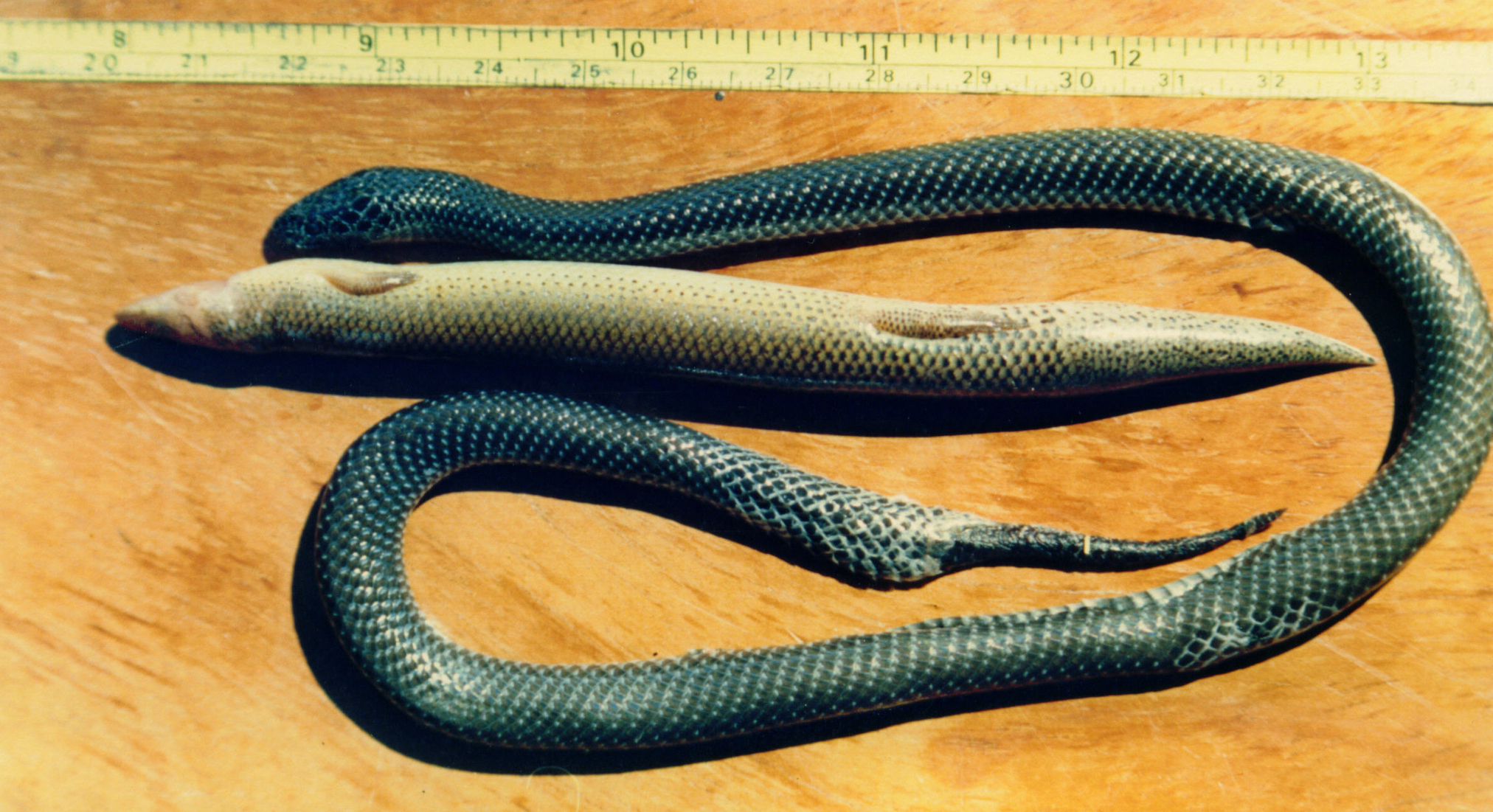
Found inside the stomach of a Cape wolf snake, in Zimbabwe

== Geographic range ==
M. sundevallii is found in Angola, Botswana, Democratic Republic of Congo, Eswatini, Ethiopia, Kenya, Malawi, Mozambique, Namibia, Somalia, South Africa, Tanzania, Uganda, Zambia, and Zimbabwe. The Reptile Database also lists Central African Republic, Sudan, and possibly South Sudan.

== Habitat ==
The preferred natural habitats of M. sundevallii are shrubland, savanna, and forest, at altitudes from sea level to 2,000 m (6,600 ft).

== Description ==
M. sundevallii usually has a snout-to-vent length (SVL) of 6–8 cm (2.4–3.1 in), but may grow to almost 9 cm (3.5 in) SVL. Dorsally, it is grayish or light brown, with dark brown speckling. Ventrally, it is uniformly cream-colored, except for the underside of the tail, which may have speckling.

== Reproduction ==
M. sundevallii is oviparous.
