= Högestad Castle =

Estate in Ystad Municipality in Scania, Sweden

- Högestads slott
- Ystad Municipality
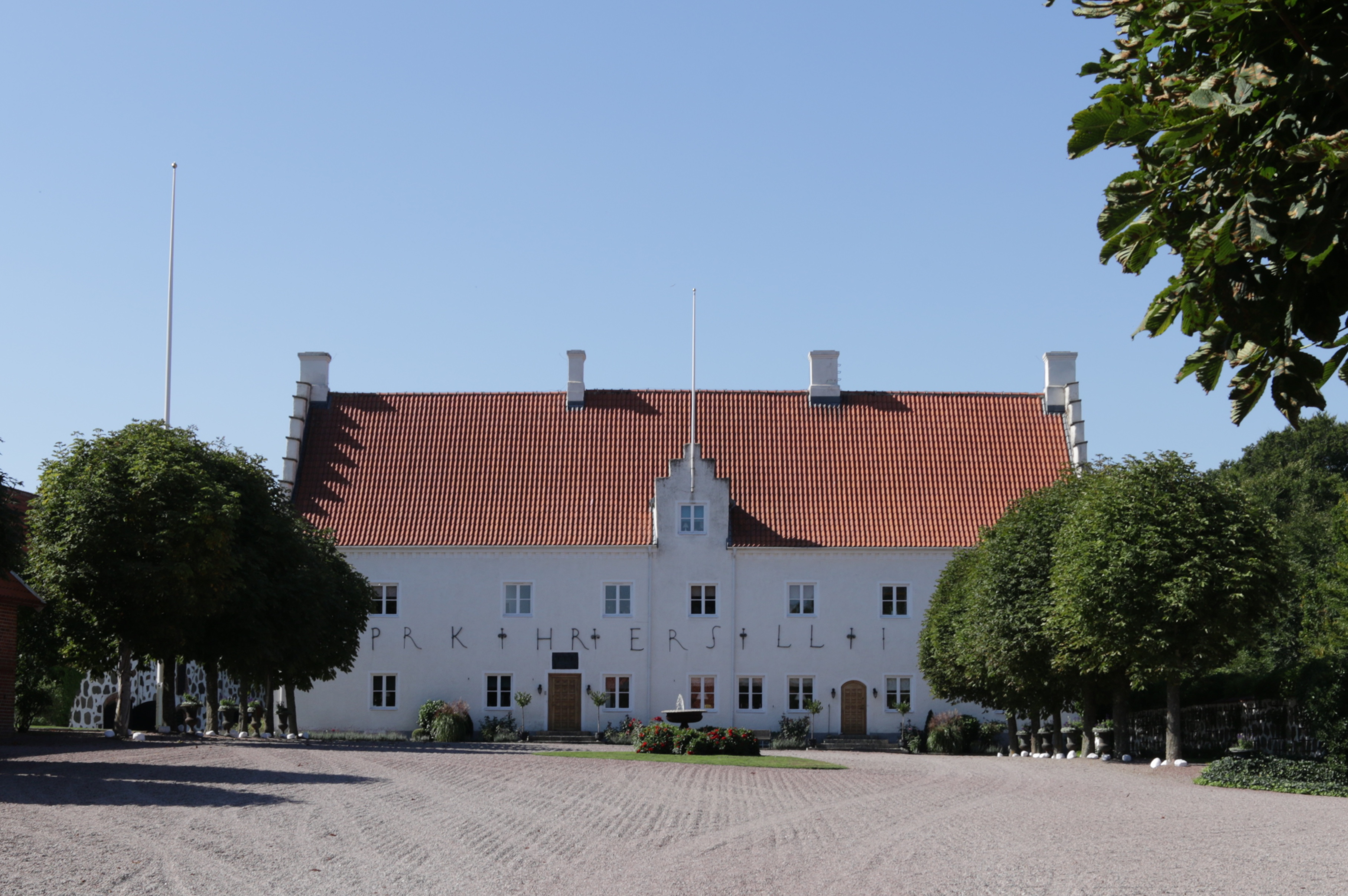
- Högestad Castle

Site information
- Open to the public: No

Location
- Scania, Sweden
- Location within Skåne
- Coordinates: 55.507222°N 13.878056°E

Site history
- Built: 15th century

Högestad Castle (Swedish: Högestads gods) is an estate in Ystad Municipality in Scania, Sweden.

== History ==
During the Middle Ages, the estate was owned by the Archbishop of Lund. In 1635 it was owned by Danish statesman Palle Rosenkrantz (1587-1642) who built the main building, a two-story stone house with stairwells. Carl Piper (1647-1716) and his wife Christina Piper (1673–1752 bought the estate in 1706.

== Notable people ==
- Carl Jakob Sundevall (1801–1875), zoologist

== See also ==
- List of castles in Sweden
