= Elapsoidea broadleyi =

Conservation status
- Data Deficient (IUCN 3.1)

Scientific classification
- Kingdom: Animalia
- Phylum: Chordata
- Class: Reptilia
- Order: Squamata
- Suborder: Serpentes
- Family: Elapidae
- Genus: Elapsoidea
- Species: E. broadleyi

Binomial name
- Elapsoidea broadleyi Jakobsen, 1997
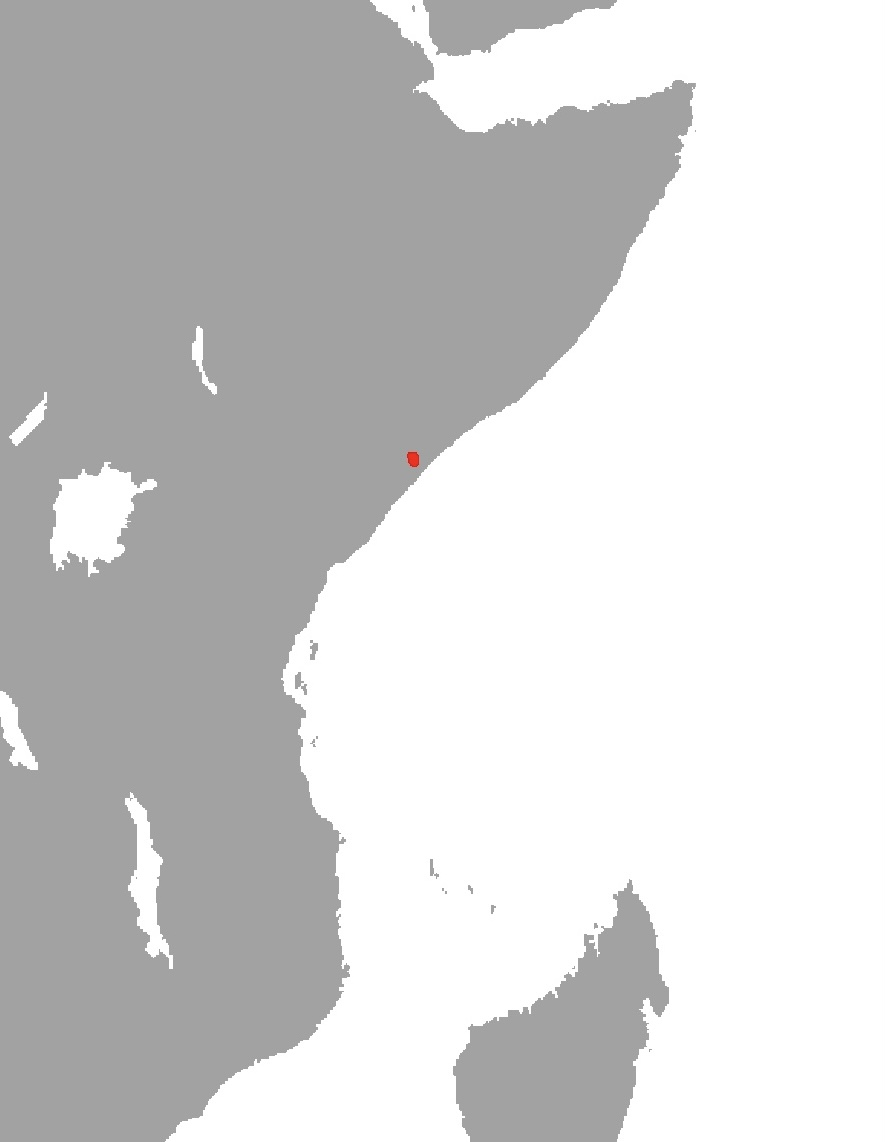

Species of snake

Elapsoidea broadleyi is a species of venomous snake in the family Elapidae. The species is endemic to Somalia.

== Etymology ==
The specific name, broadleyi, is in honor of African herpetologist Donald George Broadley.

== Geographic range ==
E. broadleyi is found in southern Somalia.

== Habitat ==
The preferred natural habitat of E. broadleyi is savanna.

== Description ==
Dorsally, E. broadleyi is uniformly pale brown. Ventrally, it is creamy white. The holotype has a total length (including tail) of 77 cm (30 in).

== Behavior ==
E, broadleyi is terrestrial.

== Reproduction ==
E. broadleyi is oviparous.
