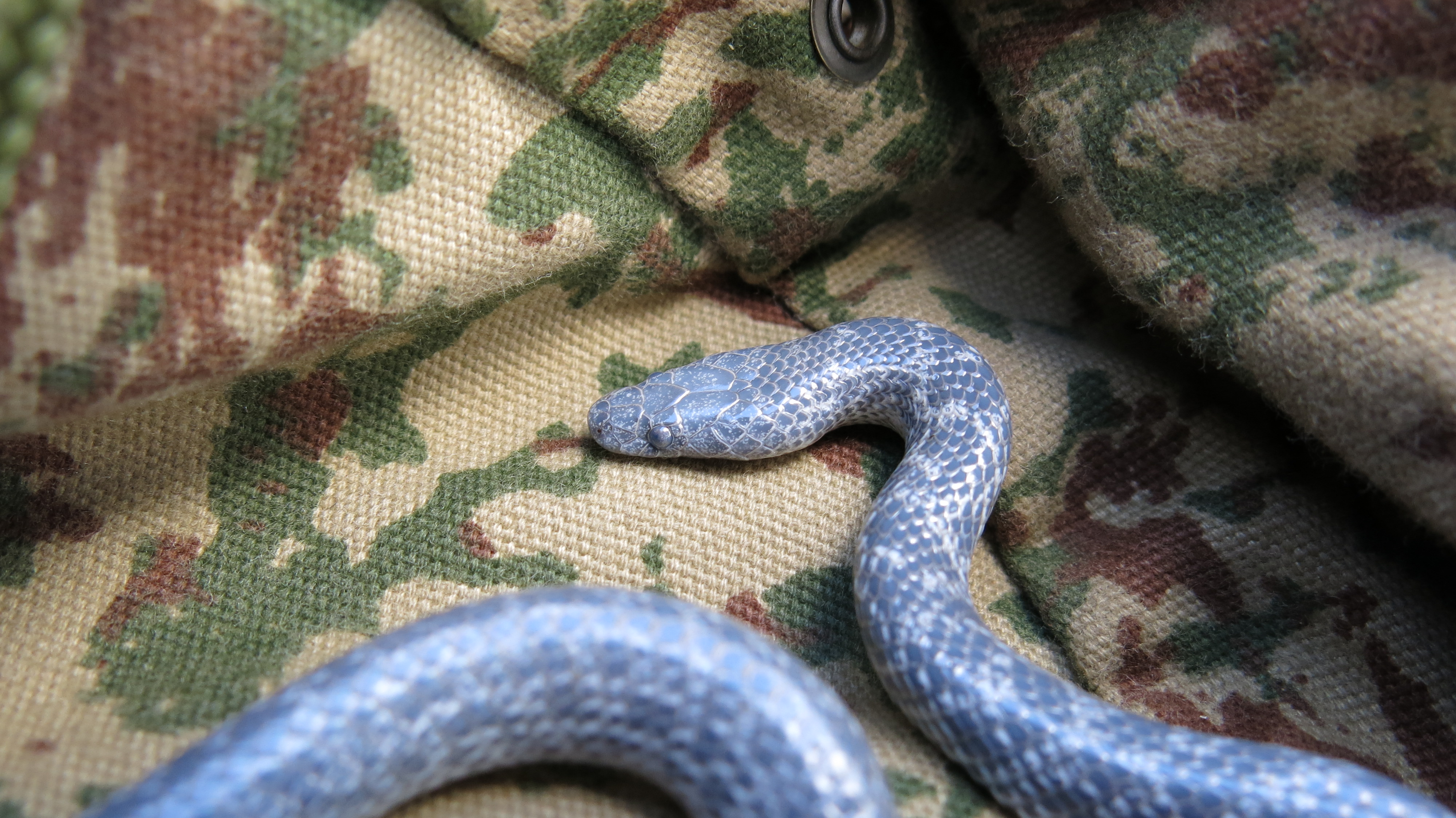
- L. variegatum, the variegated wolf snake, photographed beside the Selati River in Limpopo, South Africa

Scientific classification
- Kingdom: Animalia
- Phylum: Chordata
- Class: Reptilia
- Order: Squamata
- Suborder: Serpentes
- Family: Lamprophiidae
- Genus: Lycophidion
- Species: L. variegatum

Binomial name
- Lycophidion variegatum Broadley, 1969

= Lycophidion variegatum =

Species of snake

Lycophidion variegatum, also known as the variegated wolf snake, is a species of small nocturnal snake in the family Lamprophiidae. The species actively hunts lizards in small crevices, and is endemic to southern Africa.
