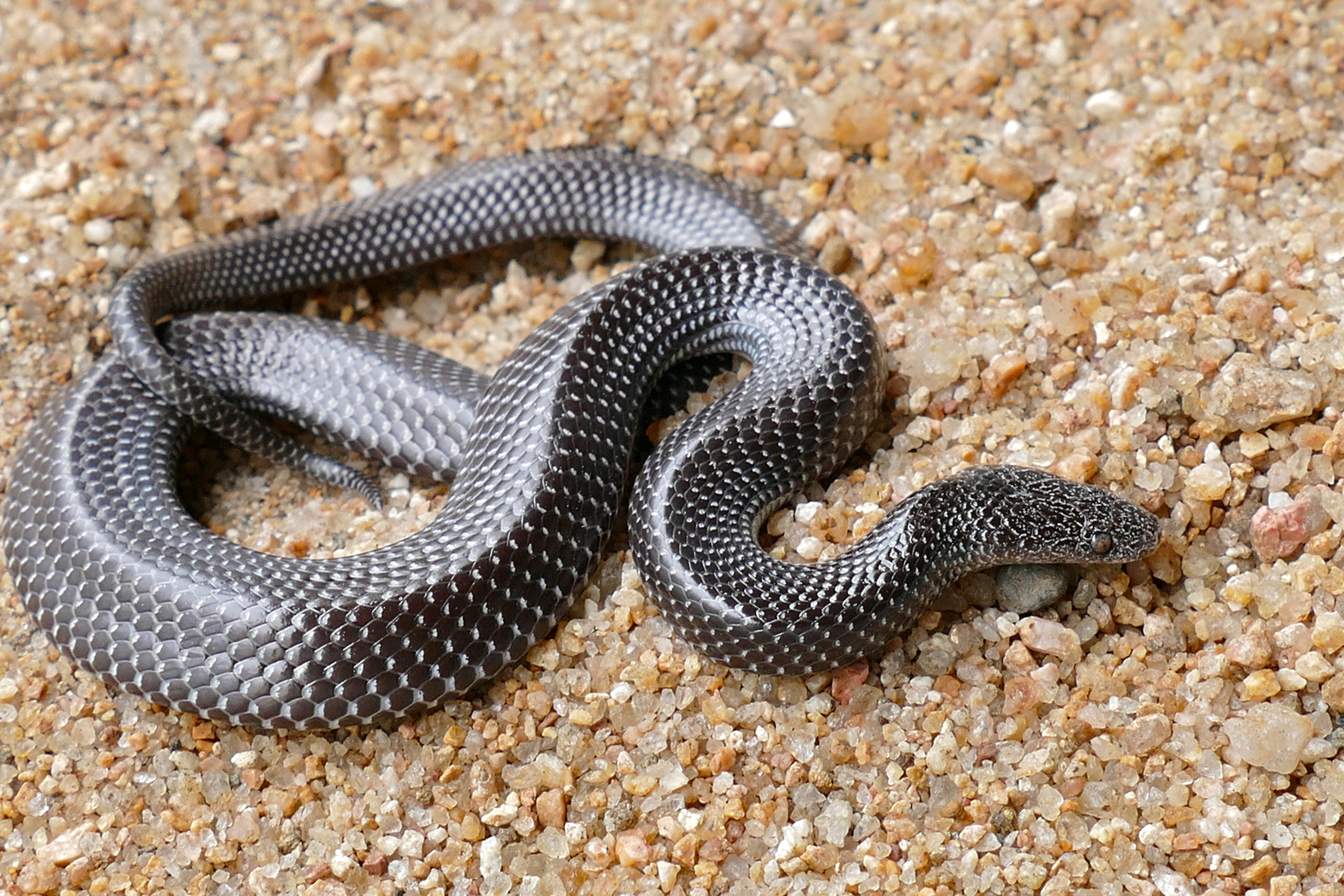
- At Lower Sabie, southern Kruger National Park
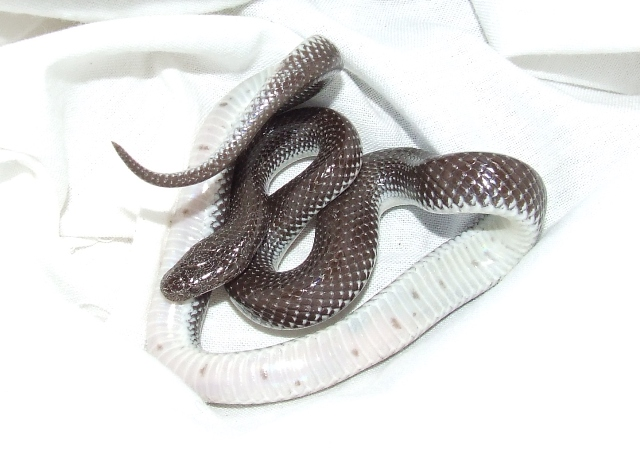
- Ventral aspect on an individual from Pretoria, Gauteng

Conservation status
- Least Concern (IUCN 3.1)

Scientific classification
- Kingdom: Animalia
- Phylum: Chordata
- Class: Reptilia
- Order: Squamata
- Suborder: Serpentes
- Family: Lamprophiidae
- Genus: Lycophidion
- Species: L. capense

Binomial name
- Lycophidion capense (A. Smith, 1831)
- IUCN range Extant (resident)

Synonyms
- Lycodon capensis A. Smith, 1831; Lycophidium capense — Boulenger, 1893; Lycophidion capense — Laurent, 1968

= Cape wolf snake =

Species of snake

The Cape wolf snake (Lycophidion capense) is a species of oviparous, nonvenomous snake which occurs over a wide area of Southern, Central, and East Africa. Though docile and harmless, it may be confused with the very venomous stiletto snake.

== Subspecies ==
The species contains three subspecies, including the nominotypical subspecies, L. c. capense:

- Lycophidion capense capense (A. Smith, 1831)
- Lycophidion capense jacksoni (Boulenger, 1893)
- Lycophidion capense loveridgei Laurent, 1968

Nota bene: A trinomial authority in parentheses indicates that the subspecies was originally described in a genus other than Lycophidion.

== Description ==
Adults regularly reach 40 cm in length, but some grow to 64 cm. It has a flattened, tapering head and marbled eye. The brown or black lateral and dorsal scales are tipped white, while the ventral scales are all-white. Long recurved fangs are present on the upper as well as lower jaws, for which they are named.

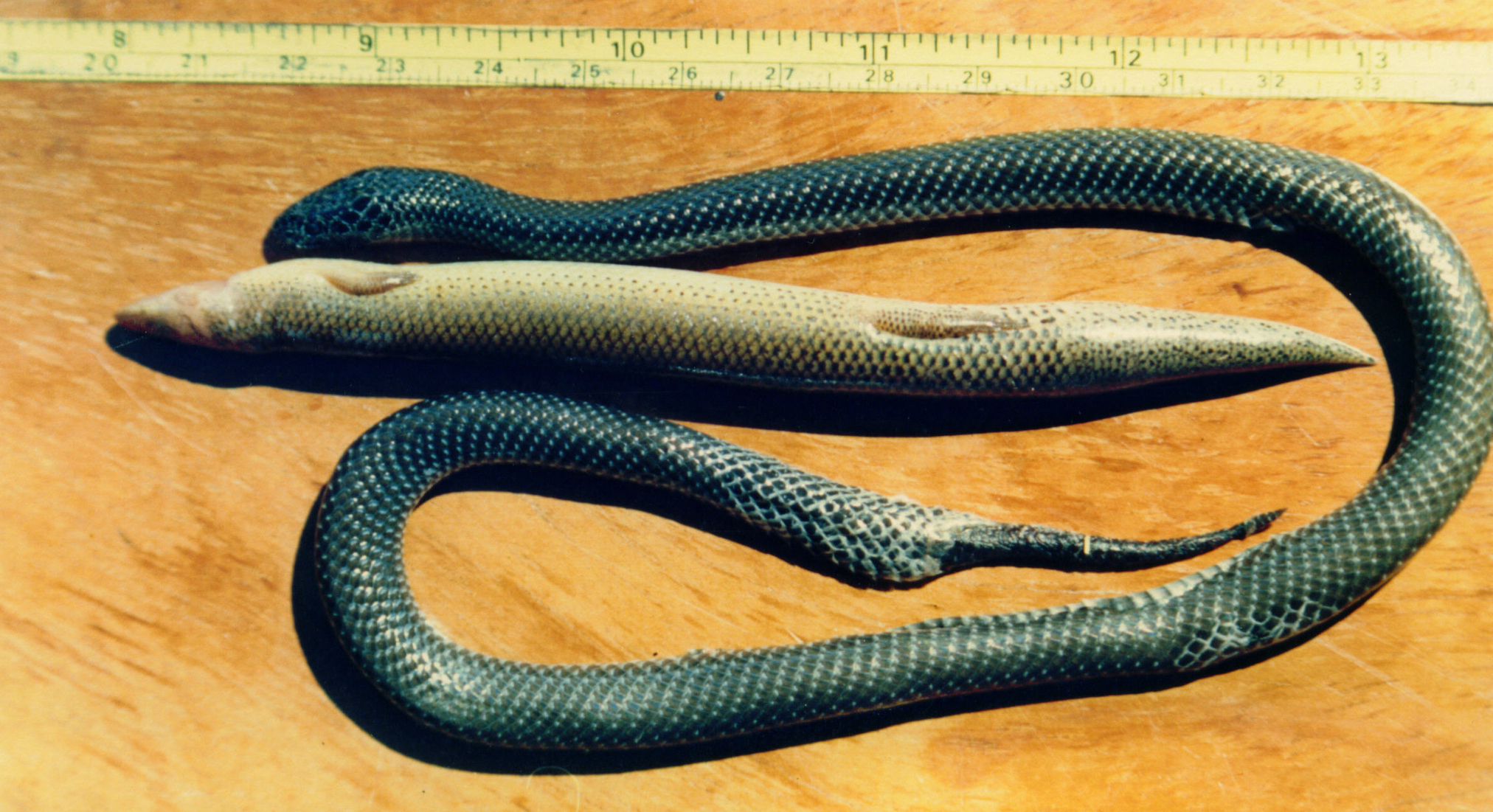
Found dead, with a Sundevall's writhing skink in its stomach.

== Diet and behaviour ==
They are widely distributed but prefer damp locations, with lowland forest and fynbos being preferred habitats. They feed mostly on geckos and skinks which they bite and kill by constriction. They are believed to reach an age of 15 to 20 years.
