= Carl Jakob Sundevall =

Swedish zoologist

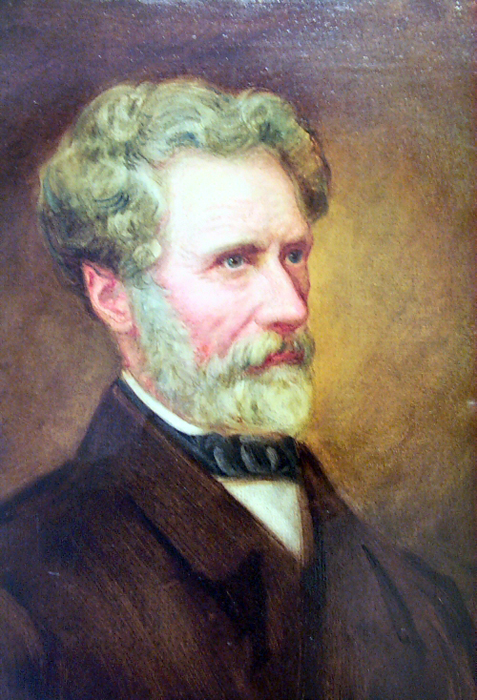
- Born: 22 October 1801; Högestad, Sweden
- Died: 2 February 1875 (aged 73); Stockholm
- Education: Lund University
- Known for: Developing a phylogeny for birds
- Scientific career
- Fields: Ornithology, entomology, arachnology
- Workplaces: Swedish Museum of Natural History, Stockholm
- Author abbrev. (zoology): Sundevall

Carl Jakob Sundevall (22 October 1801 – 2 February 1875) was a Swedish zoologist. Sundevall studied at Lund University, where he received a Ph.D. in 1823. After traveling to East Asia, he studied medicine, graduating as a Doctor of Medicine in 1830.

He was employed at the Swedish Museum of Natural History, Stockholm, from 1833, and was professor and keeper of the vertebrate section from 1839 to 1871. He wrote Svenska Foglarna (1856–87), which described 238 species of birds observed in Sweden. He classified a number of birds collected in southern Africa by Johan August Wahlberg. In 1835, he developed a phylogeny for the birds based on the muscles of the hip and leg that contributed to later work by Thomas Huxley. He then went on to examine the arrangement of the deep plantar tendons in the bird's foot. This latter information is still used by avian taxonomists. Sundevall was also an entomologist and arachnologist, for which (for the latter field) in 1833 he published an early catalog Conspectus Arachnidum. Much later in 1862, he wrote a monograph proposing a universal phonetic alphabet, Om phonetiska bokstäver.

== Legacy ==
Sundevall is commemorated in the scientific names of four species of reptiles: Elapsoidea sundevallii, Leptotyphlops sundewalli, Mochlus sundevallii, and Prosymna sundevalli. Also the rodent, Sundevall's jird (Meriones crassus), is named after him.

== Sources ==
- Anonymous (1875). [Sundevall, C. J.] Journal of Ornithology 23: 214–215.
- Anonymous (1875). [Sundevall, C. J.] Journal of Zoology 4: 61.
- Areschoug, J. E. (1879). Minnesteckning öfver C. J. Sundevall. Stockholm.
- Bonnet, P. (1945). Bibliographia Araneorum. Toulouse.
