= Caryospora (alveolate) =

Scientific classification
- Domain: Eukaryota
- Clade: Sar
- Clade: Alveolata
- Phylum: Apicomplexa
- Class: Conoidasida
- Order: Eucoccidiorida
- Family: Eimeriidae
- Genus: Caryospora; Léger, 1904

Species
- List Caryospora ahaetullae Caryospora aquilae Caryospora arcayae Caryospora argentati Caryospora barnardae Caryospora bengalensis Caryospora biarmicusis Caryospora bigenetica Caryospora bothriechis Caryospora brasiliensis Caryospora brygooi Caryospora bubonis Caryospora carajasensis Caryospora cheloniae Caryospora choctawensis Caryospora circi Caryospora cobrae Caryospora colubris Caryospora coniophanis Caryospora conophae Caryospora constancieae Caryospora corallae Caryospora demansiae Caryospora dendrelaphis Caryospora durelli Caryospora duszynskii Caryospora epicrati Caryospora ernsti Caryospora falconis Caryospora gekkonis Caryospora gloriae Caryospora gracilis Caryospora guatemalensis Caryospora heterodermus Caryospora henryae Caryospora hermae Caryospora japonicum Caryospora jararacae Caryospora jiroveci Caryospora kalimantanensis Caryospora kansasensis Caryospora kutzeri Caryospora lampropeltis Caryospora legeri Caryospora lindsayi Caryospora maculatus Caryospora madagascariensis Caryospora masticophis Caryospora matatu Caryospora maxima Caryospora mayorum Caryospora micruri Caryospora minuta Caryospora najadae Caryospora neofalconis Caryospora olfersii Caryospora paraensis Caryospora peruensis Caryospora psammophi Caryospora pseustesi Caryospora regentensis Caryospora relictae Caryospora saudiarabiensis Caryospora schokariensis Caryospora serpentis Caryospora simplex Caryospora strigis Caryospora tantillae Caryospora telescopis Caryospora tremula Caryospora undata Caryospora uptoni Caryospora varaniornati Caryospora veselyi Caryospora viprae Caryospora weyeare Caryospora zacapensis Caryospora zuckermanae

Genus of single-celled organisms

Caryospora is a genus of parasitic protozoa in the phylum Apicomplexa. The species in this genus infect birds and reptiles, with the majority of described species infecting snakes. It is the third largest genus in the family Eimeriidae.

Despite the number of species in this genus, it has not been much studied.

== History ==
The genus Caryospora was created by Leger in 1904. The name was originally spelled Karyospora, but this was changed by Leger in 1911.

== Taxonomy ==
Although the genus Caryospora is usually placed in the family Eimeriidae, it may actually be more closely related to the family Lankesterellidae.

There are at least 70 species in this genus.

== Life cycle ==
The genus Caryospora is characterised by monosporocystic octozoitic oocysts. Species in this genus infect the digestive tract of reptiles and birds. Some species may also infect small rodents which are normally prey of the reptile or bird species.

== Host records ==
=== Snakes ===
- C. ahaetullae – long-nosed vine snake (Ahaetulla nasuta), Oriental whipsnake (Ahaetulla prasina)
- C. barnardae – yellow-striped water snake (Thamnosophis stumpffi)
- C. bengalensis – rainbow water snake (Enhydris enhydris)
- C. bigenetica – timber rattlesnake (Crotalus horridus)
- C. bothriechis – Guatemalan palm viper (Bothriechis aurifer)
- C. brygooi – Madagascar cat eye snake (Madagascarophis colubrinus)
- C. brasiliensis – nuazo (Leimadophis poecilogyrus schotti), Brazilian green racer (Philodryas aestiva), culebra (Philodryas nattereri), mboi-obi (Philodryas olfersii)
- C. carajasensis – false coral (Oxyrhopus petola digitalis)
- C. choctawensis – flathead snake (Tantilla gracilis)
- C. cobrae – Indian cobra (Naja naja)
- C. colubris – narrow-striped dwarf snake (Eirenis decemlineatus), horseshoe snake (Hemorrhois hippocrepis), large whip snake (Dolichophis jugularis), western whip snake (Hierophis viridiflavus)
- C. coniophanis – black-striped snake (Coniophanes imperialis)
- C. conophae – road guarder snake (Conophis lineatus)
- C. constancieae – Amazonian coral snake (Micrurus spixii spixii)
- C. corallae – emerald tree boa (Corallus caninus)
- C. demansiae – yellow-faced whip snake (Demansia psammophis)
- C. dendrelaphis – common tree snake (Dendrelaphis punctulatus)
- C. durelli – Round Island boa (Casarea dussumieri)
- C. duszynskii – corn snake (Elaphe guttata guttata), red corn snake (Elaphe guttata emoryi), Texas rat snake (Elaphe obsoleta lindheimeri), black rat snake (Elaphe obsoleta obsoleta), prairie kingsnake (Lampropeltis calligaster calligaster)
- C. epicrati – rainbow boa (Epicrates cenchria cenchria)
- C. gracilis – flathead snake (Tantilla gracilis)
- C. guatemalensis – milk snake (Lampropeltis triangulum)
- C. hermae – Boaedon fuliginosus, western striped sand snake (Psammophis phillipsii)
- C. heterodermus – variable green snake (Philothamnus heterodermus)
- C. japonicum – tiger keelback (Rhabdophis tigrinus)
- C. jararacae – coffee palm viper (Bothriechis lateralis), fer-de-lance (Bothrops atrox), jararaca (Bothrops jararaca)
- C. kalimantanensis – mangrove snake (Boiga dendrophila)
- C. lampropeltis – prairie kingsnake (Lampropeltis calligaster), eastern kingsnake (Lampropeltis getula), milk snake (Lampropeltis triangulum)
- C. legeri – sand snake (Psammophis sibilans sibilans)
- C. maculatus – spotted night adder (Causus maculatus)
- C. madagascariensis – Madagascar cat eye snake (Madagascarophis colubrinus), Malagasy colubrid (Mimophis mahfalensis)
- C. masticophis – eastern racer (Coluber constrictor), Masticophis flagellum
- C. matatu – horned bush viper (Atheris ceratophorus)
- C. maxima – saw-scaled viper (Echis carinatus)
- C. mayorum – road guarder snake (Conophis lineatus)
- C. micruri – Amazonian coral snake (Micrurus spixii spixii)
- C. minuta – Madagascar hognose snake (Leioheterodon madagascariensis)
- C. najae – red spitting cobra (Naja pallida)
- C. najadae – Dahl's whip snake (Platyceps najadum)
- C. olfersii – Lichtenstein's green racer (Philodryas olfersii)
- C. paraensis – false coral (Oxyrhopus petola digitalis)
- C. peruensis – Argentine vine snake (Xenoxybelis argenteus)
- C. psammophi – brown house Snake (Boaedon fuliginosus), Olive sand snake (Psammophis phillipsii)
- C. pseustesi – yellow-bellied puffing snake (Pseustes sulphureus sulphureus)
- C. regentensis – eastern green mamba (Dendroaspis angusticeps), Western green mamba (Dendroaspis viridis)
- C. relictae – Florida crowned snake (Tantilla relicta)
- C. saudiarabiensis – African carpet viper (Echis carinatus)
- C. serpentis – Madagascar hognose snake (Leioheterodon madagascariensis), Madagascan cat-eyed snake (Madagascarophis colubrinus), Madagascar colubrid (Mimophis mahfalensis)
- C. simplex – Russell's viper (Daboia russelli), horned viper (Vipera ammodytes), European asp (Vipera aspis), common European adder (Vipera berus), Kaznakov's viper (Vipera kaznakovi), Palestine viper (Vipera palaestinae), Ottoman viper (Montivipera xanthina xanthina)
- C. tantillae – Florida crowned snake (Tantilla relicta)
- C. telescopis – European cat snake (Telescopus fallax)
- C. veselyi – long-nosed whip snake (Ahaetulla nasuta)
- C. weyerae – brown house snake (Boaedon fuliginosus), olive grass racer (Psammophis phillipsii)
- C. zacapensis – neotropical whip snake (Masticophis mentovarius)

=== Birds ===
- C. aquilae – golden eagle (Aquila chrysaetos)
- C. arcayae – roadside hawk (Buteo magnirostris), broad-winged hawk (Buteo platypterus)
- C. argentati – European herring gull (Larus argentatus)
- C. biarmicusis – lanner falcon (Falco biarmicus)
- C. bubonis – great horned owl (Bubo virginianus)
- C. circi – western marsh harrier (Circus aeruginosus)
- C. falconis – peregrine falcon (Falco peregrinus), Eurasian hobby (Falco subbuteo), European kestrel (Falco tinnunculus)
- C. gloriae – Cuban blackbird (Dives atroviolaceus)
- C. jiroveci – European robin (Erithacus rubecula)
- C. kansasensis – Swainson's hawk (Buteo swainsoni)
- C. kutzeri – lanner falcon (Falco biarmicus), saker falcon (Falco cherrug), laggar falcon (Falco jugger), prairie falcon (Falco mexicanus), peregrine falcon (Falco peregrinus), gyrfalcon (Falco rusticolus), Eurasian hobby (Falco subbuteo), European kestrel (Falco tinnunculus)
- C. lindsayi – red-tailed hawk (Buteo jamaicensis)
- C. neofalconis – lanner falcon (Falco biarmicus), Falco mexicanus, peregrine falcon (Falco peregrinus), Eurasian hobby (Falco subbuteo), European kestrel (Falco tinnunculus)
- C. strigis – barn owl (Tyto alba)
- C. tremula – turkey vulture (Cathartes aura)
- C. undata – tufted puffin (Lunda cirrhata), European herring gull (Larus argentatus), common murre (Uria aalge aalge)
- C. uptoni – red-tailed hawk (Buteo jamaicensis borealis)

=== Other species ===
- C. cheloniae – green sea turtle (Chelonia mydas mydas)
- C. gekkonis – tokay gecko (Gekko gekko)
- C. ernsti – Carolina anole (Anolis carolinensis)
- C. varaniornati – ornate monitor (Varanus ornatus)
