= Road guarder =

For the road guarder genus of snakes:

- Conophis

For the road guarder species of snake:

- Conophis lineatus
