= Boaedon angolensis =

Scientific classification
- Kingdom: Animalia
- Phylum: Chordata
- Class: Reptilia
- Order: Squamata
- Suborder: Serpentes
- Family: Lamprophiidae
- Genus: Boaedon
- Species: B. angolensis

Binomial name
- Boaedon angolensis (Bocage, 1895)

Synonyms
- Lamprophis angolensis Bocage, 1895

Species of house snake native to Angola

Boaedon angolensis, commonly known as the Angolan house snake, is a non-venomous snake species in the family Lamprophiidae. It is native to Angola and is part of the diverse group of African house snakes in the genus Boaedon.

== Taxonomy ==
Boaedon angolensis was originally described by Bocage in 1895 as Lamprophis angolensis. For much of the 20th century, it was considered a synonym or variety of other house snake species, such as Boaedon lineatus or Boaedon fuliginosus. However, recent taxonomic revisions based on morphological differences have revalidated B. angolensis as a distinct species.

== Description ==
Boaedon angolensis can be distinguished from other Angolan Boaedon species by having a lower number of midbody scale rows (25–28 vs. 27–31 in B. variegatus), as well as differences in coloration and patterning. Like other house snakes, it is small to medium-sized, with a slender body and smooth scales. Coloration is typically brown to olive, sometimes with faint patterning.
