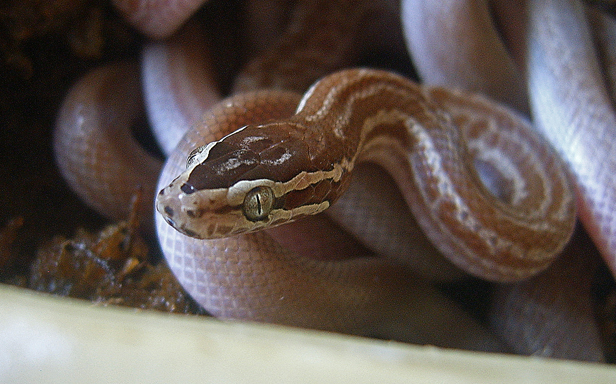
- Juvenile Cape house snake, Boaedon capensis

Conservation status
- Least Concern (IUCN 3.1)

Scientific classification
- Kingdom: Animalia
- Phylum: Chordata
- Class: Reptilia
- Order: Squamata
- Suborder: Serpentes
- Family: Lamprophiidae
- Genus: Boaedon
- Species: B. capensis

Binomial name
- Boaedon capensis (Duméril & Bibron, 1854)

= Boaedon capensis =

Cape house snake

Species of snake

Boaedon capensis, the Cape house snake, also known as the brown house snake, is a species of lamprophiid from Botswana, South Africa (from KwaZulu-Natal all the way through to the Western Cape), Mozambique, Zambia and Zimbabwe. They are a non-venomous lamprophiid. This species was previously grouped in the genus Lamprophis but is regrouped with the genus Boaedon.

== Appearance ==
Cape house snakes are usually dark brown on top, but the colour varies greatly from almost black through brown to olive green. The stripes that stretch from the rostral scale through the eye to the back of the head are very strong, thick, and bold. This species may have a lateral stripe running down the flanks, often resembling the links of a chain. They also sometimes have lateral stripes running along either side of the spine. Linking lines between the lateral striping is not uncommon. These body markings tend to be a paler brown/cream in colour on top of the often dark, chocolate-brown base tones. These markings normally fade two-thirds of the way down the body until only the base colour remains, but there are exceptions to the rule. Individuals without pattern are often found in the wild. These individuals have the head markings but no other markings on top of an often pale-brown body. Like all house snakes, Boaedon capensis is very iridescent, their scales often shining with an oily sheen in certain lights. This is a sexually dimorphic species. Females grow substantially larger than males, sometimes reaching up to 4 feet (120 cm). Males are smaller, often only reaching 2–2.5 ft (61–76 cm).

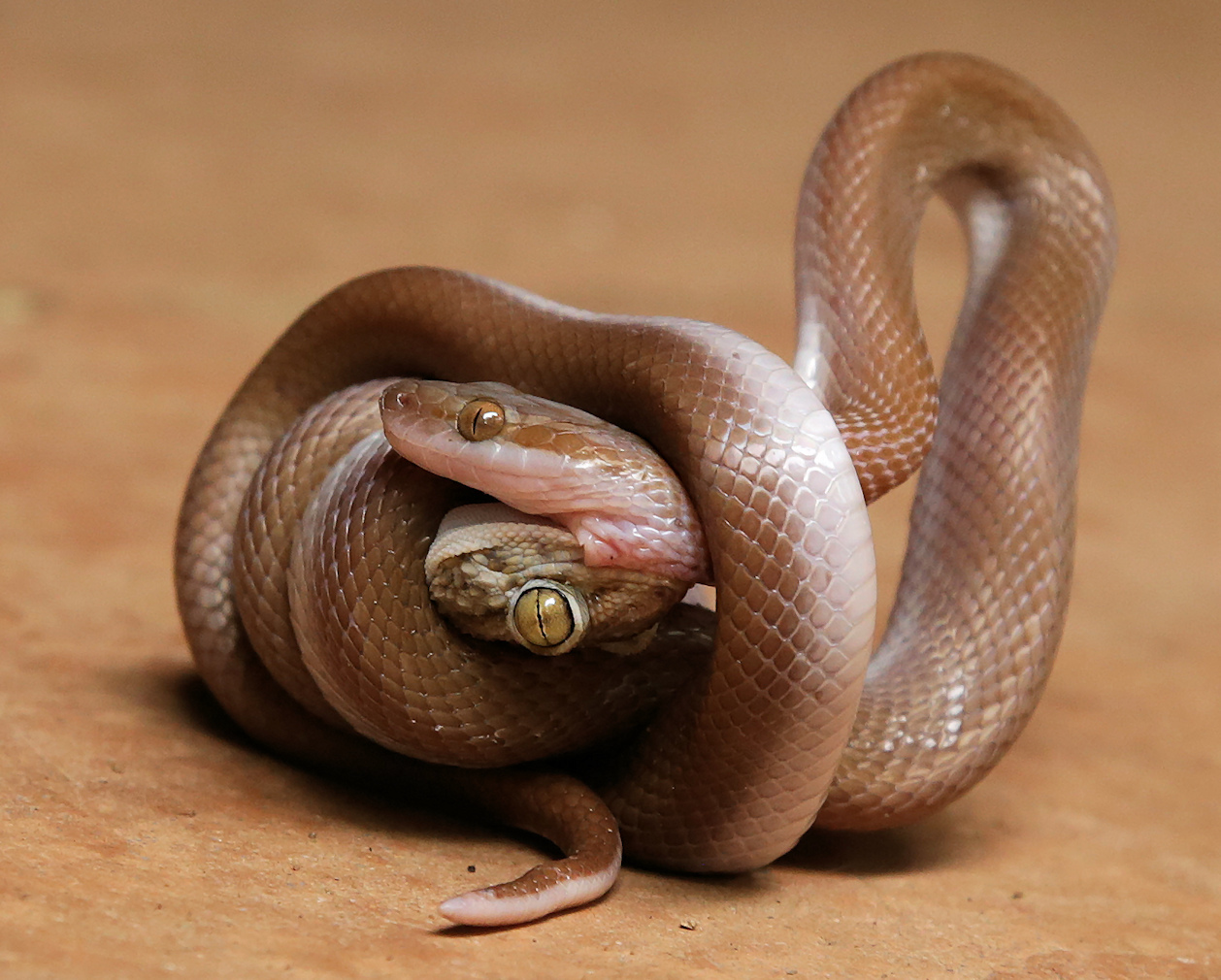
With a Turner's thick-toed gecko

== Behaviour and diet ==
In the wild, this species is known to frequent human habitations, feeding on the rodents that gather there. It is a common misconception that South African people introduce these snakes to their homes to eat rodents. This happens extremely rarely.

Nocturnal by nature, this species is known to eat entire nests of mice in one sitting. In the wild, this species breeds once or twice per year.

== In captivity ==
This species is increasingly more common in the exotic pet trade, with many hobbyists beginning to keep and breed this species throughout the world. It has become increasingly popular with hobbyists as more reproducible morphs become available. Their care is basic, making them ideal for the new hobbyist, yet they still hold their interest for the more advanced keepers as well. In captivity, this species is known to breed as many as 6 times a year, laying 5–16 eggs every 60 days or so.

=== Morphs ===
With more selective and captive breeding taking place, there are an increasingly high number of genetically viable colour variants of Boaedon capensis available through the pet trade. Those that are currently known are listed below:

T+Albinos: (Tyrosinase+ (positive) albinos), also known as "caramel" albinos, are very interesting; the body colour is a light, buttery yellow-pale orange. Their eyes are green with black pupils. Their belly colour is mother-of-pearl, the same as it is for normals.

T-Albinos: (Tyrosinase- (negative) albinos) are very similar to the T+ in appearance. They are usually red over the body with white markings, and a bright white belly. The eyes are green with red pupils.

Anerythristic: Also called "anery", this morph is characterised by a grey-blue overtone, with some mild yellow possibly on the sides, similar to anery corn snakes. The markings on the body are similar to that of the normals, and pale creamy-white in colour. The eyes are similar in colour to the overall body tone, with regular black pupils.

Calico: This is an interesting mutation; it appears as though it does not develop fully until the snake is around a year old. For its first year, roughly, the snake presents with normal coloration before several scales will begin to turn white. Some keepers have compared the phenomenon to a snake with "vitiligo". This gradually spreads as the snake sheds and grows, leaving the animal's body with larger areas of white scales, also appearing somewhat similar to a piebald or pied in other species.

Erythristic: Erythristic individuals present with heightened red pigment in the skin. This causes all other pigments to appear muted. These snakes have an overall red colour.

Hypomelanistic: Hypomelanistic house snakes are similar in appearance to the T-Albinos, but slightly darker. There is visually more brown and dull red pigment. The eyes are green with primarily black pupils that in some lights, have a slight red tinge.

Ilumo: Ilumo is the name that has been coined for the green house snake morph. This morph heightens the green pigment in the skin, while the underbelly is a pale olive-yellow in colour. This appears to be a genetically patternless morph, with all individuals thus far having no pattern.

Patternless: Patternless house snakes have the "V" markings on the head, mother-of-pearl belly tone, and brown overtones but none of the pattern on the body.

Striped: Striped-phase house snakes greatly resemble the striped house snake species (B. lineatus) in their appearance. They are (reportedly) a locale-specific variant, occurring in the Springbok area of the Northern Cape. With the Springbok area being semi-arid, some keepers prefer to house these snakes with lower ambient humidity. This is speculated, by some, to be not a morph of the Cape house snake but a regional subspecies. Nonetheless, until such classification occurs, striped-phase morphs are still produced.
