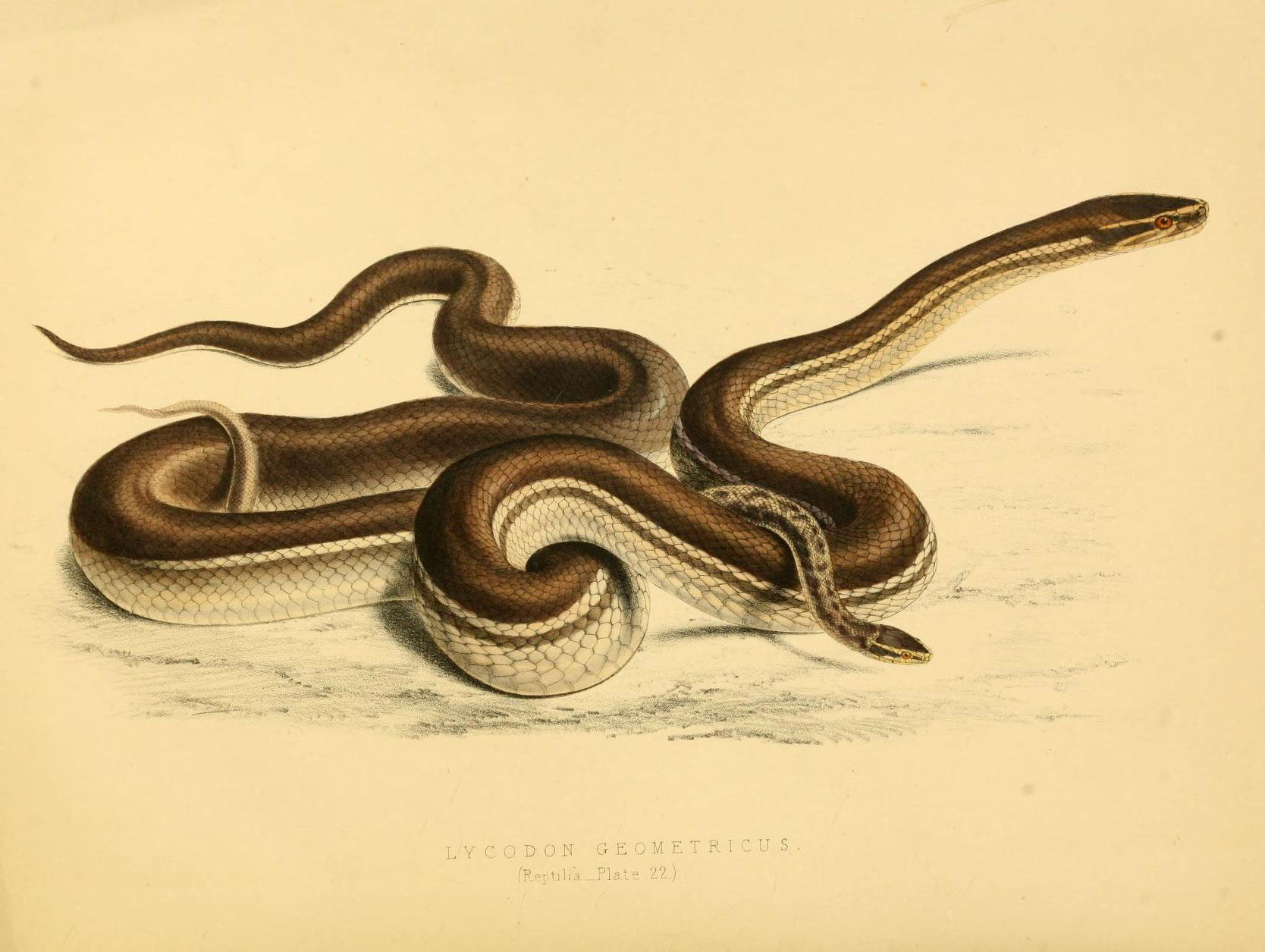

Conservation status
- Endangered (IUCN 3.1)

Scientific classification
- Kingdom: Animalia
- Phylum: Chordata
- Class: Reptilia
- Order: Squamata
- Suborder: Serpentes
- Family: Lamprophiidae
- Genus: Boaedon
- Species: B. geometricus

Binomial name
- Boaedon geometricus (Schlegel, 1837)

= Seychelles house snake =

Species of snake

The Seychelles house snake (Boaedon geometricus) is a species of snake in the family Lamprophiidae. It is endemic to Seychelles.

Its natural habitats are subtropical or tropical dry forest, subtropical or tropical moist lowland forest, and rural gardens. It is threatened by habitat loss.
