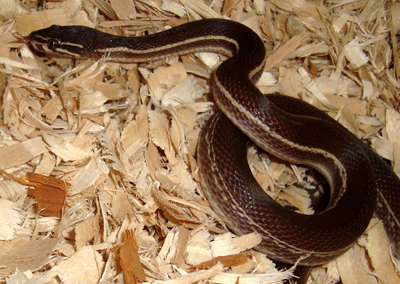
- Boaedon lineatus, striped house snake

Scientific classification
- Kingdom: Animalia
- Phylum: Chordata
- Class: Reptilia
- Order: Squamata
- Suborder: Serpentes
- Family: Lamprophiidae
- Subfamily: Lamprophiinae
- Genus: Boaedon; A.M.C. Duméril, Bibron & A.H.A. Duméril, 1854

Species
- 27 recognized species, see text.

= Boaedon =

Genus of snakes

Boaedon is a genus of snakes, commonly known as brown house snakes, in the family Lamprophiidae. The genus is native to Africa, and was originally described by French zoologists André Marie Constant Duméril, Gabriel Bibron, and Auguste Duméril. However, the species contained in the genus Boaedon were reclassified as belonging to the genus Lamprophis, which had been described by Austrian zoologist Leopold Fitzinger in 1843. This taxonomy remained widely accepted until November 2010 when a phylogenetic study was published by South African herpetologist Christopher M.R. Kelly et al. who resurrected the Boaedon clade. Primary literature usually lists Boaedon and related genera as belonging to the family Lamprophiidae within the superfamily Elapoidea, the superfamily which includes the venomous cobras and mambas.

== Species ==
There are 27 species placed within the genus Boaedon, with new and updated ones occasionally being described.

- Boaedon angolensis (Bocage, 1895) – Angolan house snake
- Boaedon arabicus H. Parker, 1930
- Boaedon bedriagae Boulenger, 1905
- Boaedon bocagei Hallermann, Ceríaco, Schmitz, R. Ernst, Conradie, Verburgt, Marques & Bauer, 2020 – Bocage's brown house snake
- Boaedon branchi Hallermann, Ceríaco, Schmitz, R. Ernst, Conradie, Verburgt, Marques & Bauer, 2020 – Branch's brown house snake
- Boaedon broadleyi Hallermann & Hawlitschek, 2025
- Boaedon capensis A.M.C. Duméril, Bibron & A.H.A. Duméril, 1854 – Cape house snake
- Boaedon fradei Hallermann, Ceríaco, Schmitz, R. Ernst, Conradie, Verburgt, Marques & Bauer, 2020 – Frade's brown house snake
- Boaedon fuliginosus Boulenger, 1893 – sooty house snake
- Boaedon geometricus (Schlegel, 1837) – Seychelles house snake
- Boaedon lineatus A.M.C. Duméril, Bibron & A.H.A. Duméril, 1854 – striped house snake
- Boaedon littoralis J.-F. Trape & Mediannikov, 2016 – coastal house snake
- Boaedon longilineatus J.-F. Trape & Mediannikov, 2016 – long-lined house snake
- Boaedon maculatus H. Parker, 1932 – dotted house snake
- Boaedon mendesi Ceríaco, Arellano, Jadin, Marques, Parrinha & Hallermann, 2021
- Boaedon mentalis (Günther, 1888) – Namibian house snake
- Boaedon montanus J.-F. Trape, Mediannikov, He. Hinkel & Ha. Hinkel, 2022
- Boaedon olivaceus (A.H.A. Duméril, 1856) – olive house snake
- Boaedon paralineatus J.-F. Trape & Mediannikov, 2016
- Boaedon perisilvestris J.-F. Trape & Mediannikov, 2016 – Central African lined house snake
- Boaedon radfordi Greenbaum, Portillo, K. Jackson & Kusamba, 2015 – Radford's house snake
- Boaedon subflavus J.-F. Trape & Mediannikov, 2016 – yellow house snake
- Boaedon subniger Hallermann & Hawlitschek, 2025
- Boaedon subtaeniatus Laurent, 1954
- Boaedon unicolor A.M.C. Duméril, Bibron & A.H.A. Duméril, 1854
- Boaedon upembae (Laurent, 1954)
- Boaedon variegatus (Bocage, 1867)
- Boaedon virgatus (Hallowell, 1854) – Hallowell's house snake

Nota bene: A binomial authority in parentheses indicates that the species was originally described in a genus other than Boaedon.

== Appearance ==
All members of the genus Boaedon are small snakes, generally attaining a total length (tail included) of little more than 4 feet (120 cm). A sexually dimorphic genus, female Boaedon snakes are always larger than males of the same age, which attain a total length of only approximately 2 feet (60 cm). There is some variance between species and between geographic locales of species.

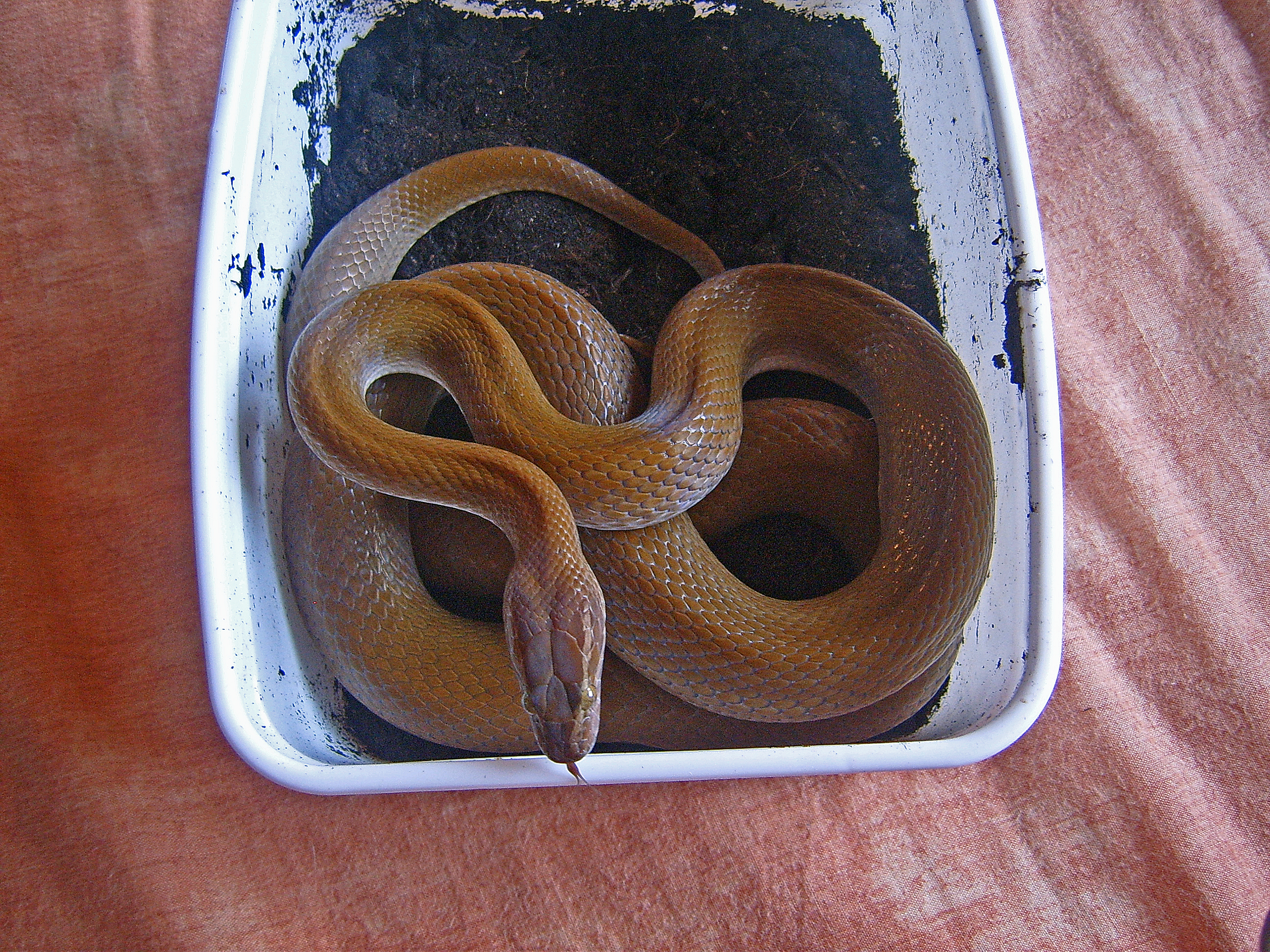
Adult female "patternless" Boaedon capensis

Overall body colouration is typically sandy brown to black, but green, orange, red and a variety of other locale specific variations do exist. All species are nocturnal by nature and have a vertically elliptic pupil. They also have with few exceptions a v-shaped set of stripes stretching from the rostral scale through the eye to the rear of the head. Body pattern varies among species. Many species are all patternless except for stripes on heads. B. variegatus, B. bedriagae, B. mendesi, B. geometricus, B. maculatus, B. capensis are with more-or-less strongly patterned bodies. B. lineatus and B. longilineatus have lateral striping running the length of the body. Many species appear similar, and confusion is common when non-experts are attempting to distinguish one species from another..

== Geographic range ==
Species of brown house snakes of the genus Boaedon occur in all of sub-Saharan Africa, inhabiting dense forests and deserts as well as all other habitats in between. They are commonly found around towns where they will feast on the rodents which gather there.
