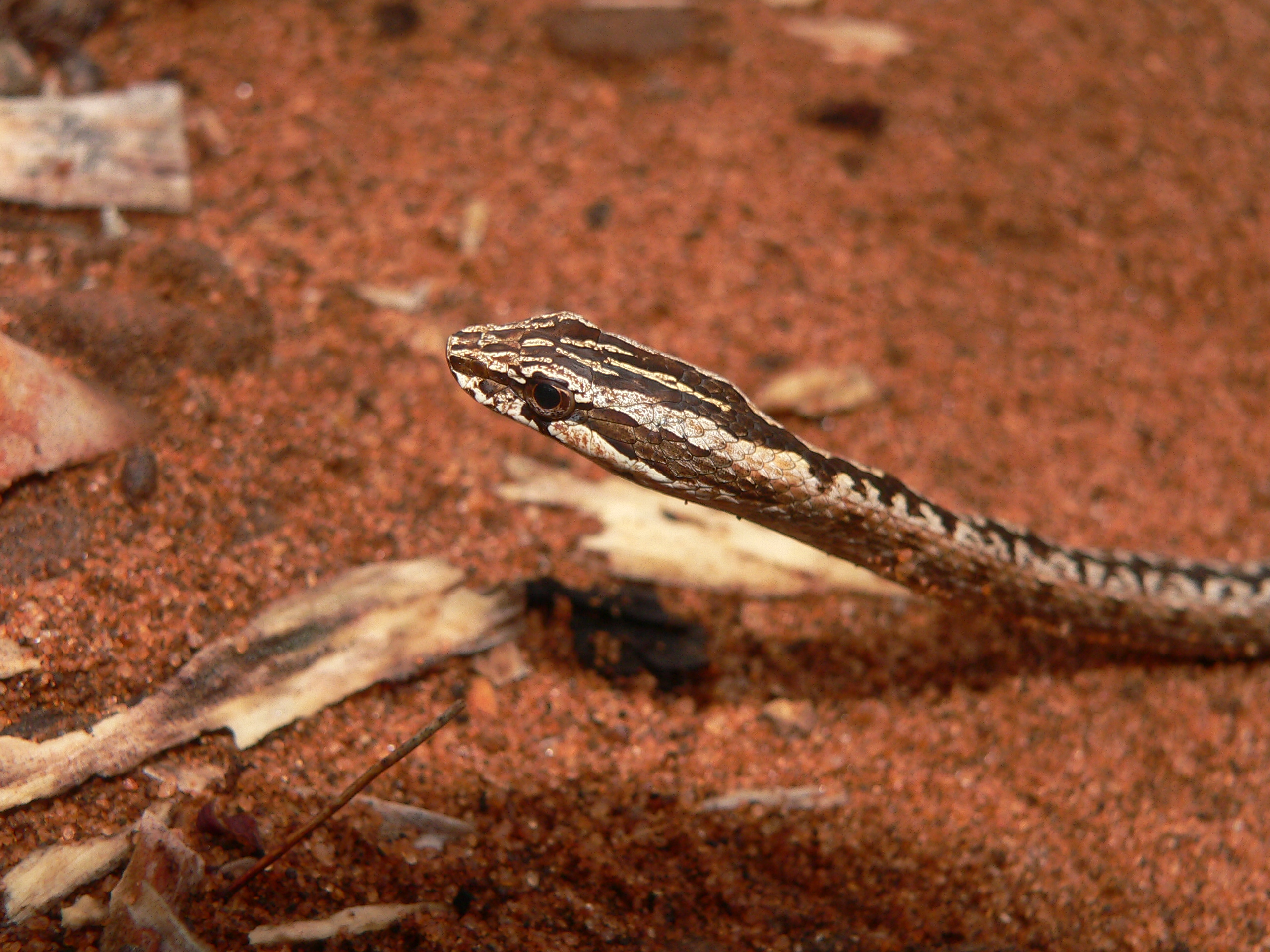
- Mimophis mahfalensis

Scientific classification
- Kingdom: Animalia
- Phylum: Chordata
- Class: Reptilia
- Order: Squamata
- Suborder: Serpentes
- Family: Psammophiidae
- Genus: Mimophis; Günther, 1868

Type species
- Psammophis mahfalensis Grandidier, 1867

= Mimophis =

Genus of snakes

Mimophis is a genus of snakes in the family Psammophiidae. Species in the genus are native to Madagascar. Prior to 2017, the genus comprised only a single species, Mimophis mahfalensis. A second species, Mimophis occultus, was described in 2017.

== Species ==
The following species are recognized as being valid.

- Mimophis mahfalensis (Grandidier, 1867)
- Mimophis occultus Ruane, Myers, Lo, Yuen, Welt, Juman, Futterman, Nussbaum, Schneider, Burbrink & Raxworthy, 2017

Nota bene: A binomial authority in parentheses indicates that the species was originally described in a genus other than Mimophis.
