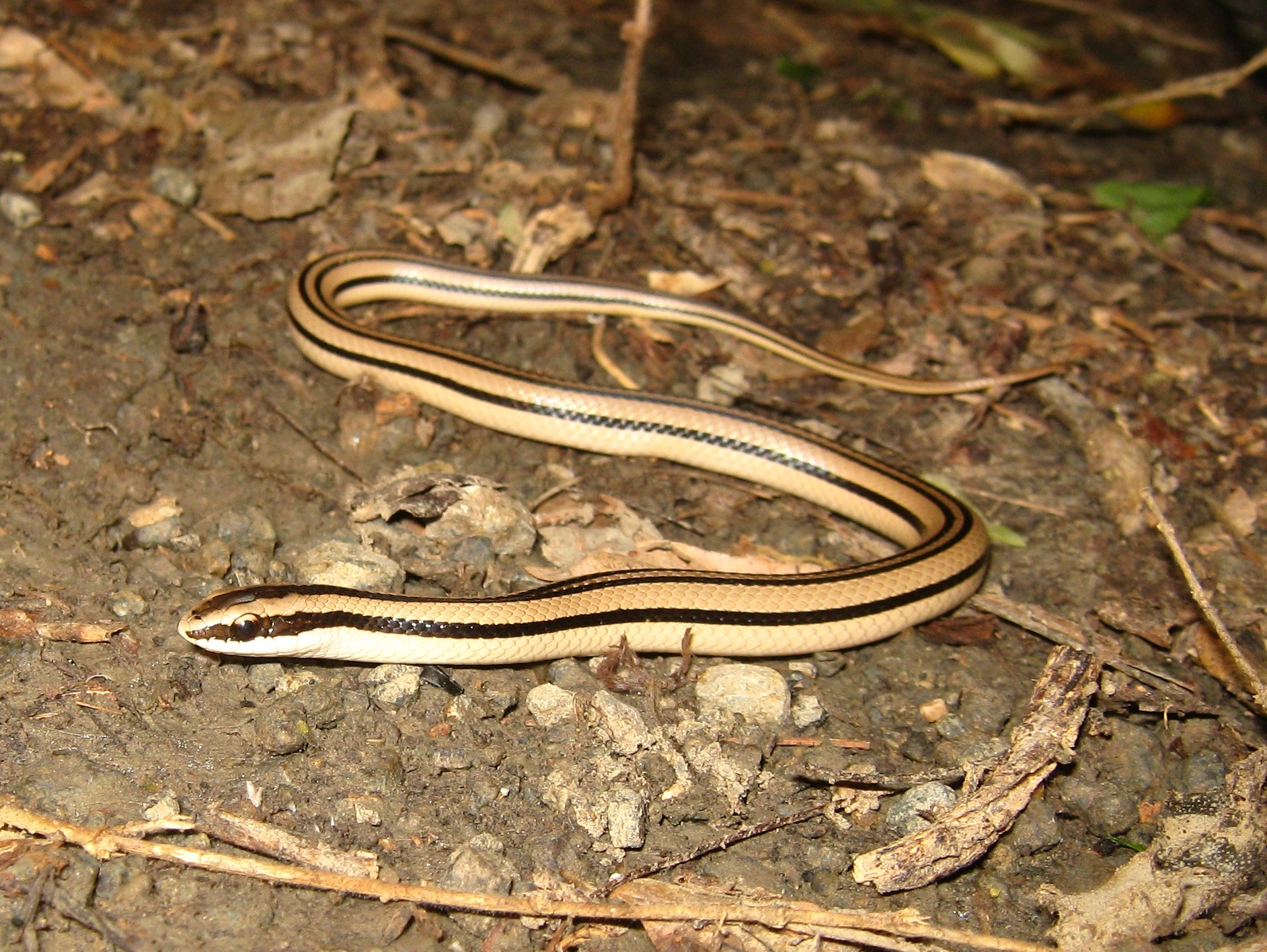

Conservation status
- Least Concern (IUCN 3.1)

Scientific classification
- Kingdom: Animalia
- Phylum: Chordata
- Class: Reptilia
- Order: Squamata
- Suborder: Serpentes
- Family: Colubridae
- Genus: Conophis
- Species: C. vittatus

Binomial name
- Conophis vittatus W. Peters, 1860
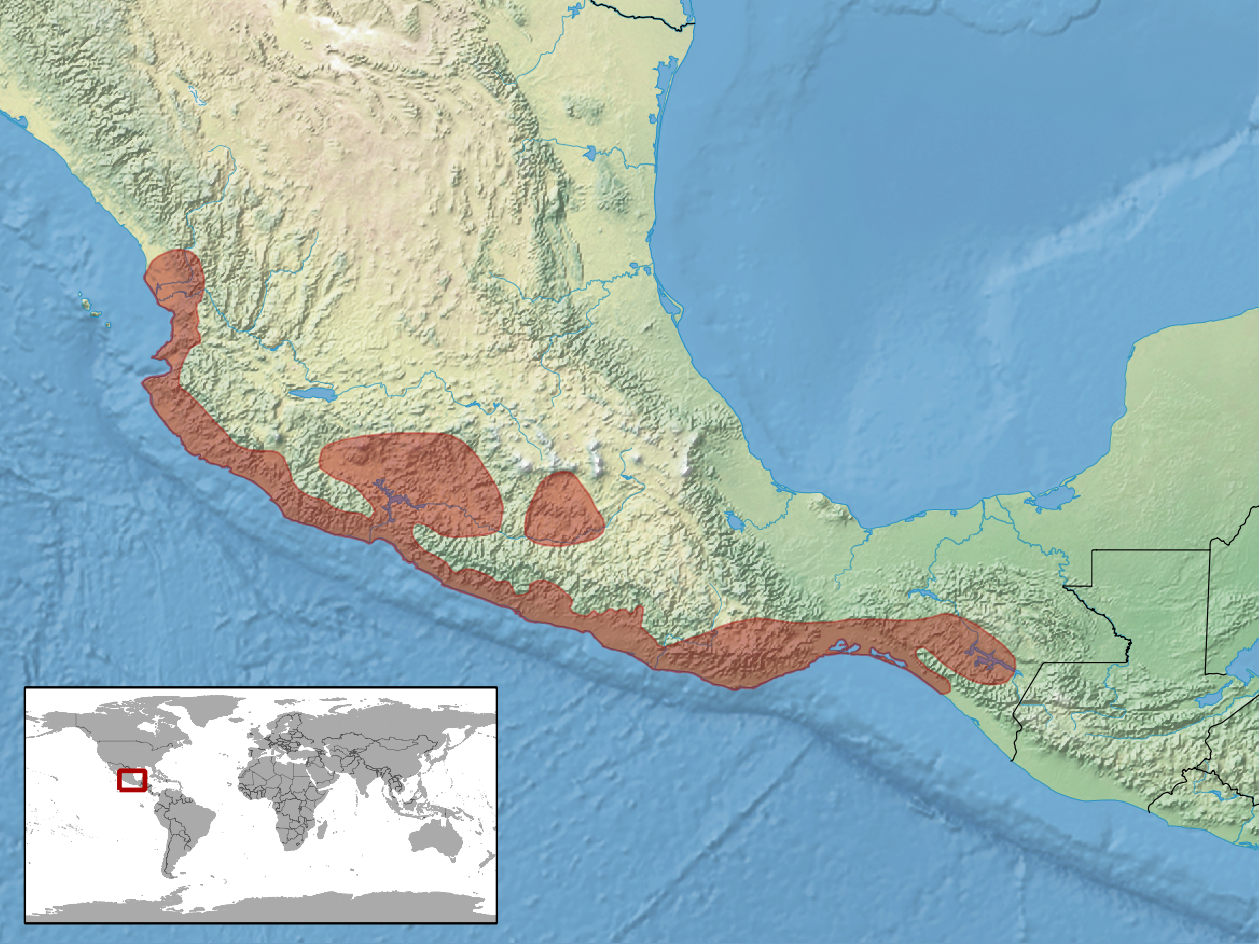

Synonyms
- Conophis sumichrastii Cope, 1876; Conophis sumichrastii viduus Cope, 1876; Conophis viduus Cope, 1876; Conophis vittatus viduus Cope, 1876

= Conophis vittatus =

Species of snake

Conophis vittatus, also known commonly as the striped road guarder and la guardacaminos rayada in local Spanish, is a species of snake in the subfamily Dipsadinae of the family Colubridae. The species is native to Mexico and Guatemala.

== Description ==
Conophis vittatus has seven upper labials, and a white chin.

== Habitat ==
Conophis vittatus is found in a variety of natural habitats including forest, shrubland, and grassland, as well as in disturbed habitats such as agricultural land and urban areas, at elevations up to 1,000 m (3,300 ft).

== Reproduction ==
Conophis vittatus is oviparous.
