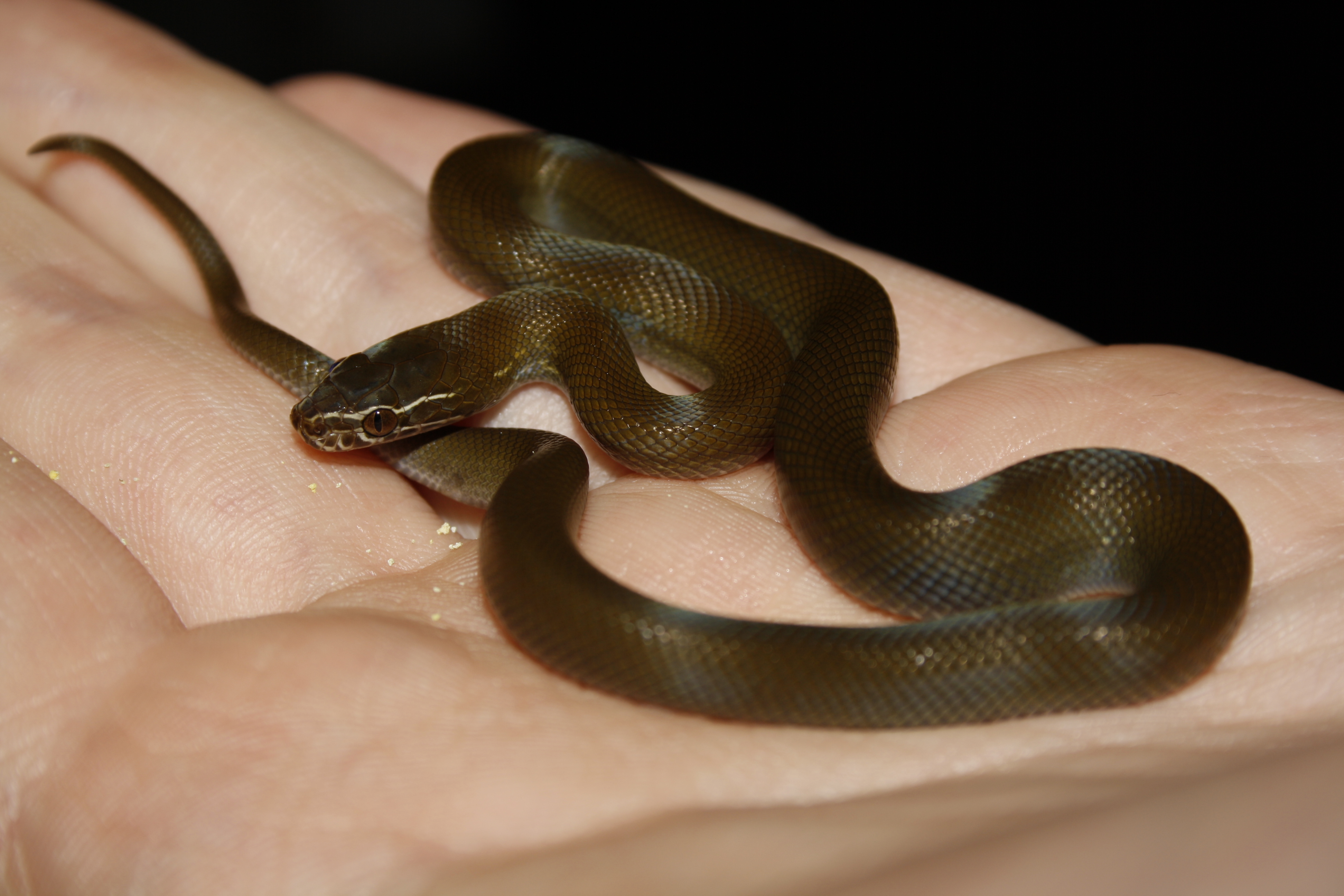

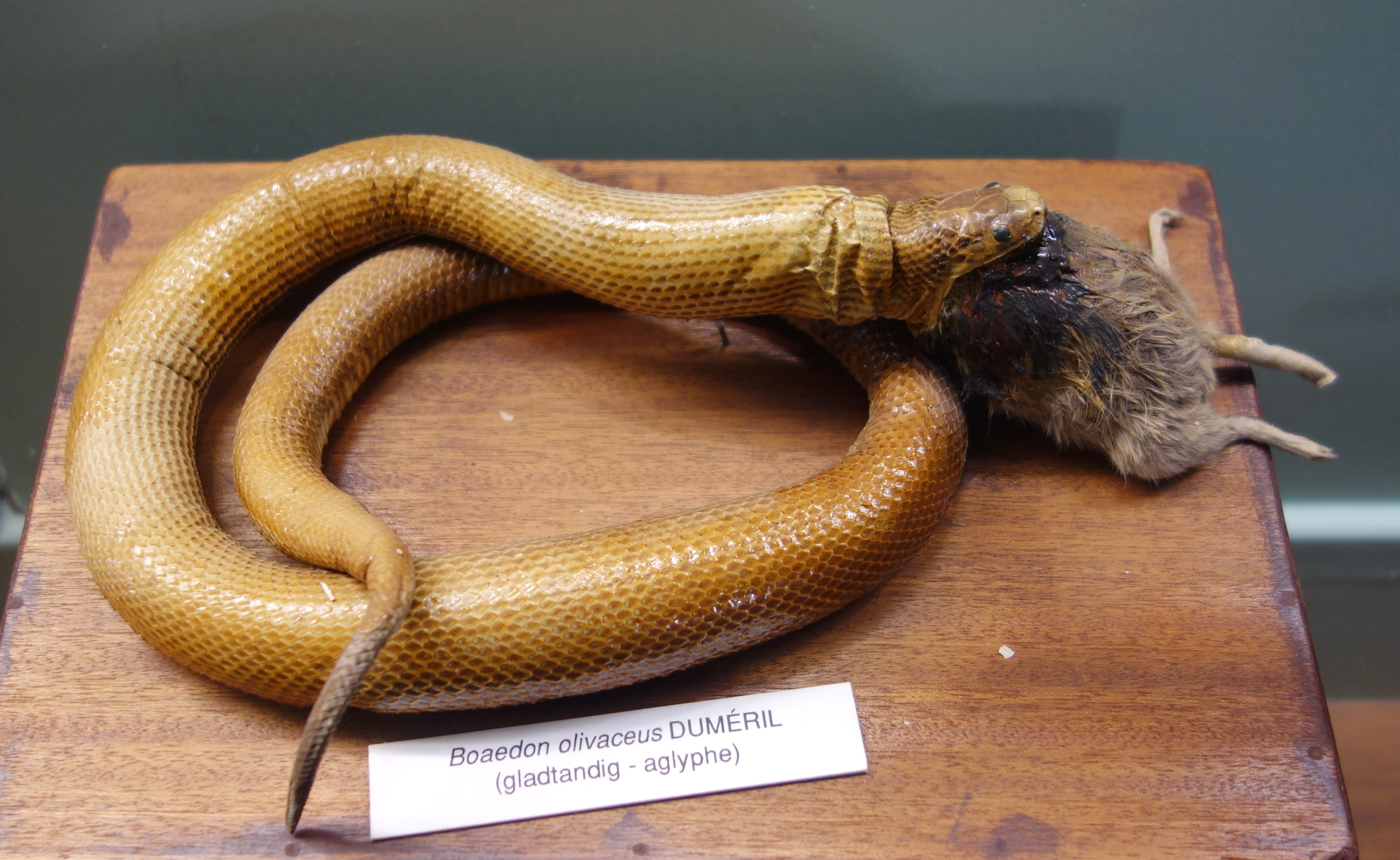

Scientific classification
- Domain: Eukaryota
- Kingdom: Animalia
- Phylum: Chordata
- Class: Reptilia
- Order: Squamata
- Suborder: Serpentes
- Family: Lamprophiidae
- Genus: Boaedon
- Species: B. olivaceus

Binomial name
- Boaedon olivaceus (Duméril, 1856)

Synonyms
- Holuropholis olivaceus Duméril, 1856; Boodon poensis Günther, 1888; Boodon olivaceus Boulenger, 1892; Boaedon olivaceus stirnensis Stucki-Stirn, 1979; Lamprophis olivaceus Broadley, 1983

= Boaedon olivaceus =

Species of snake

Boaedon olivaceus is a species of snake in the family Lamprophiidae. The species is endemic to Africa.

== Taxonomic history ==
Eli Greenbaum and colleagues described the taxonomy of this species as being "relatively stable for over a century". Auguste Duméril described this species in 1856, making it the type species of his newly-circumscribed genus Holuropholis. Charles Eugène Aubry-Lecomte collected the holotype. The junior synonym Boodon poensis was described by Albert Günther in 1888,. George Albert Boulenger synonymized the two species, classifying it in the genus Boodon. Arthur Loveridge classified it in the genus Boaedon in 1957.

In 1974, M. C. Stucki-Stirn described a subspecies B. olivaceus stirnensis, but it was synonymized with the species itself in 2014.

== Distribution ==
The type locality of this species is Gabon, and the type locality of its junior synonym B. poensis is Bioko.

It is found in Central and West and East Africa. Countries it has been recorded in include: the Democratic Republic of the Congo, Central African Republic, Gabon, Guinea, and Togo.

It is found in and near rainforests.

== Description ==
Its total length is 850 mm (33 in). It has small eyes, which can be orange, red, or reddish-brown. Its dorsum is glossy and colored dark gray or a dark, greyish-brown.
