= Conophis morai =

Conservation status
- Data Deficient (IUCN 3.1)

Scientific classification
- Kingdom: Animalia
- Phylum: Chordata
- Class: Reptilia
- Order: Squamata
- Suborder: Serpentes
- Family: Colubridae
- Genus: Conophis
- Species: C. morai

Binomial name
- Conophis morai Pérez-Higareda, López-Luna & H.M. Smith, 2002
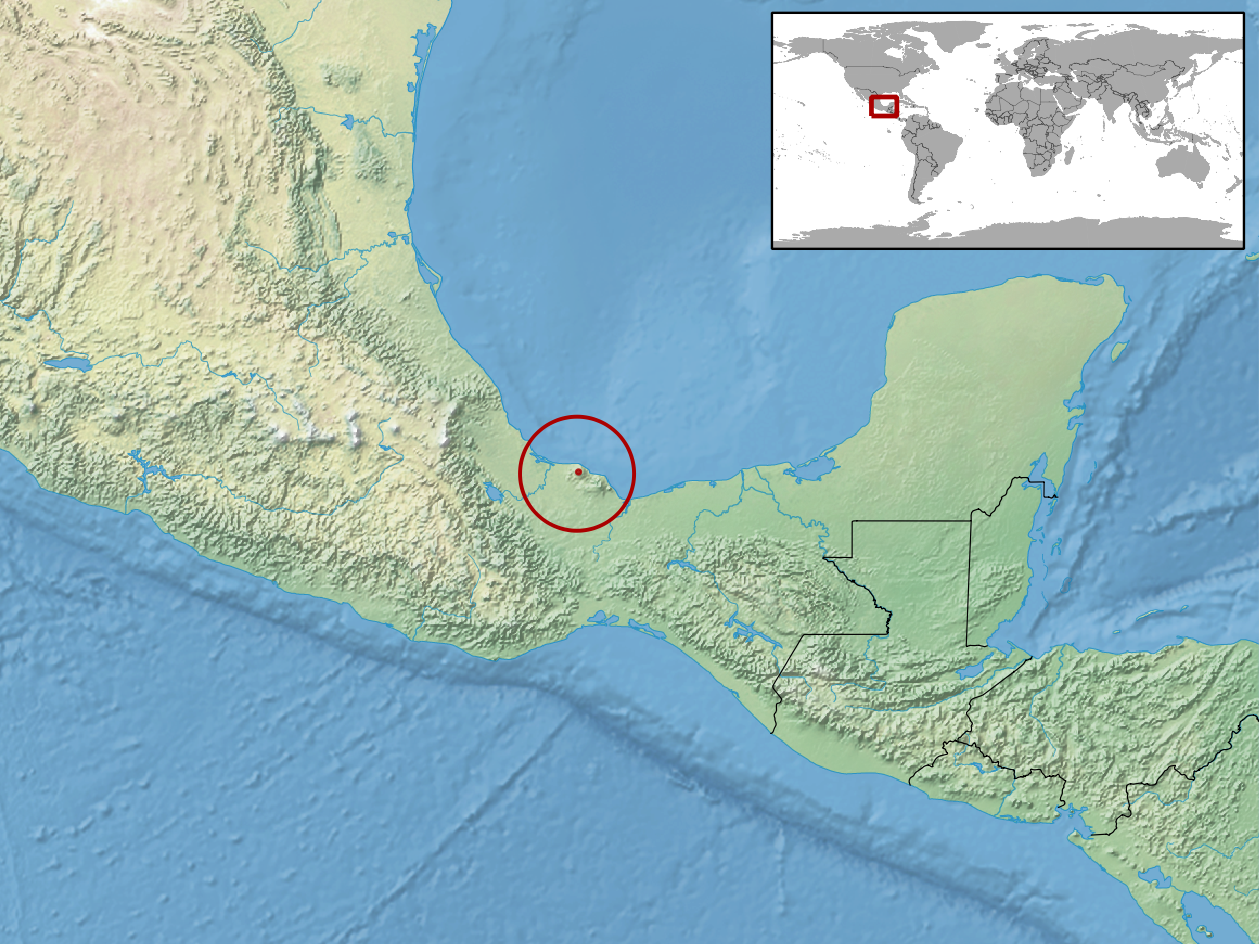

Species of snake

Conophis morai, also known commonly as Mora's road guarder, the Tuxtlan road guarder, and guarda caminos de Mora in Mexican Spanish, is a species of snake in the subfamily Dipsadinae of the family Colubridae. The species is native to Mexico.

== Etymology ==
The specific name, morai, is in honor of biologist Roberto Mora who collected the holotype.

== Geographic distribution ==
Conophis morai is endemic to the Mexican state of Veracruz.

== Habitat ==
The preferred natural habitat of Conophis morai is forest, at elevations around 1,050 m (3,440 ft).

== Reproduction ==
Conophis morai is oviparous.
