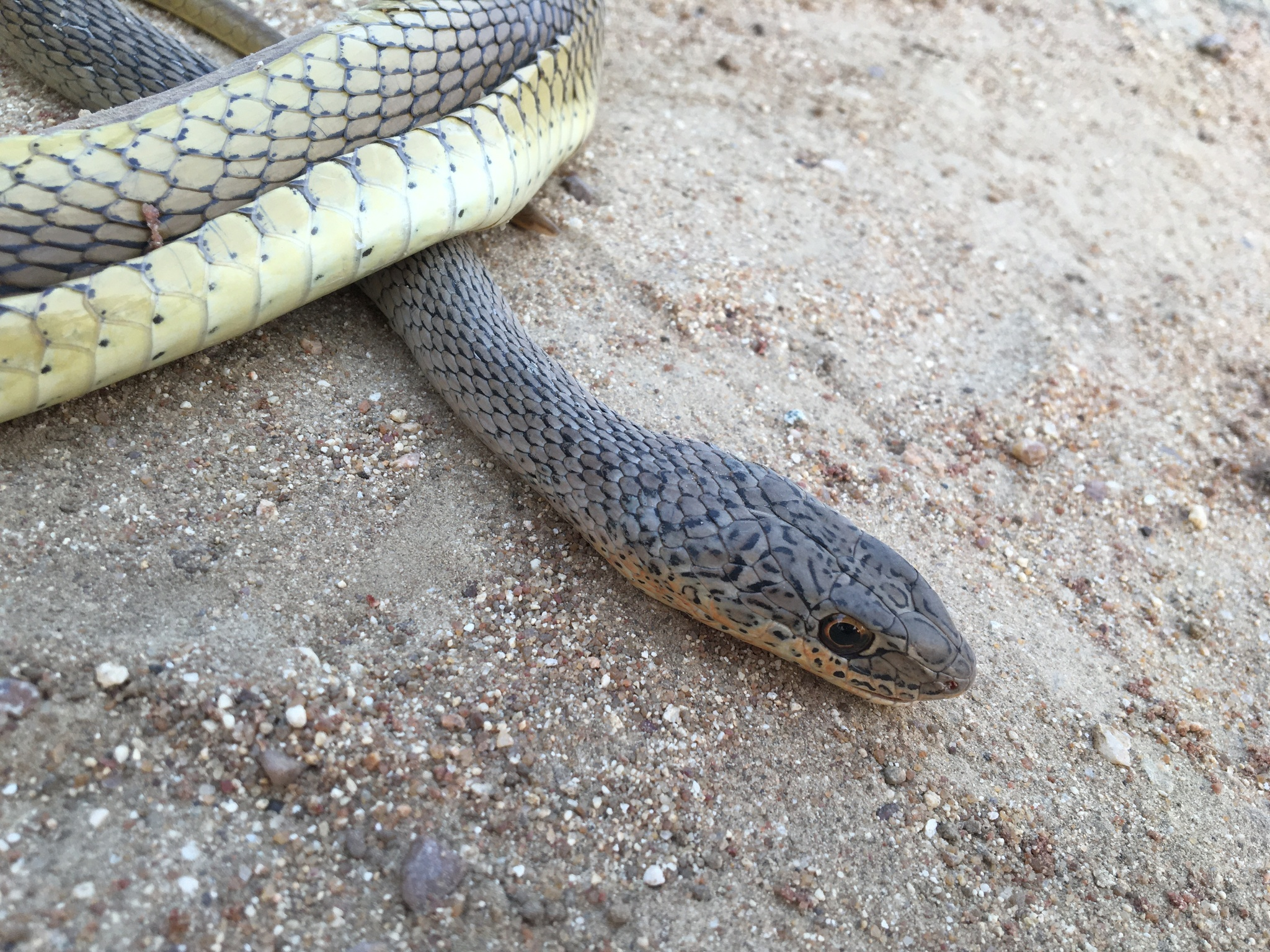

Scientific classification
- Kingdom: Animalia
- Phylum: Chordata
- Class: Reptilia
- Order: Squamata
- Suborder: Serpentes
- Family: Psammophiidae
- Genus: Psammophis
- Species: P. phillipsii

Binomial name
- Psammophis phillipsii (Hallowell, 1844)

= Psammophis phillipsii =

Species of reptile

Psammophis phillipsii, also known by its common name olive grass racer, is a species from the genus Psammophis. The species was originally described in 1844.
