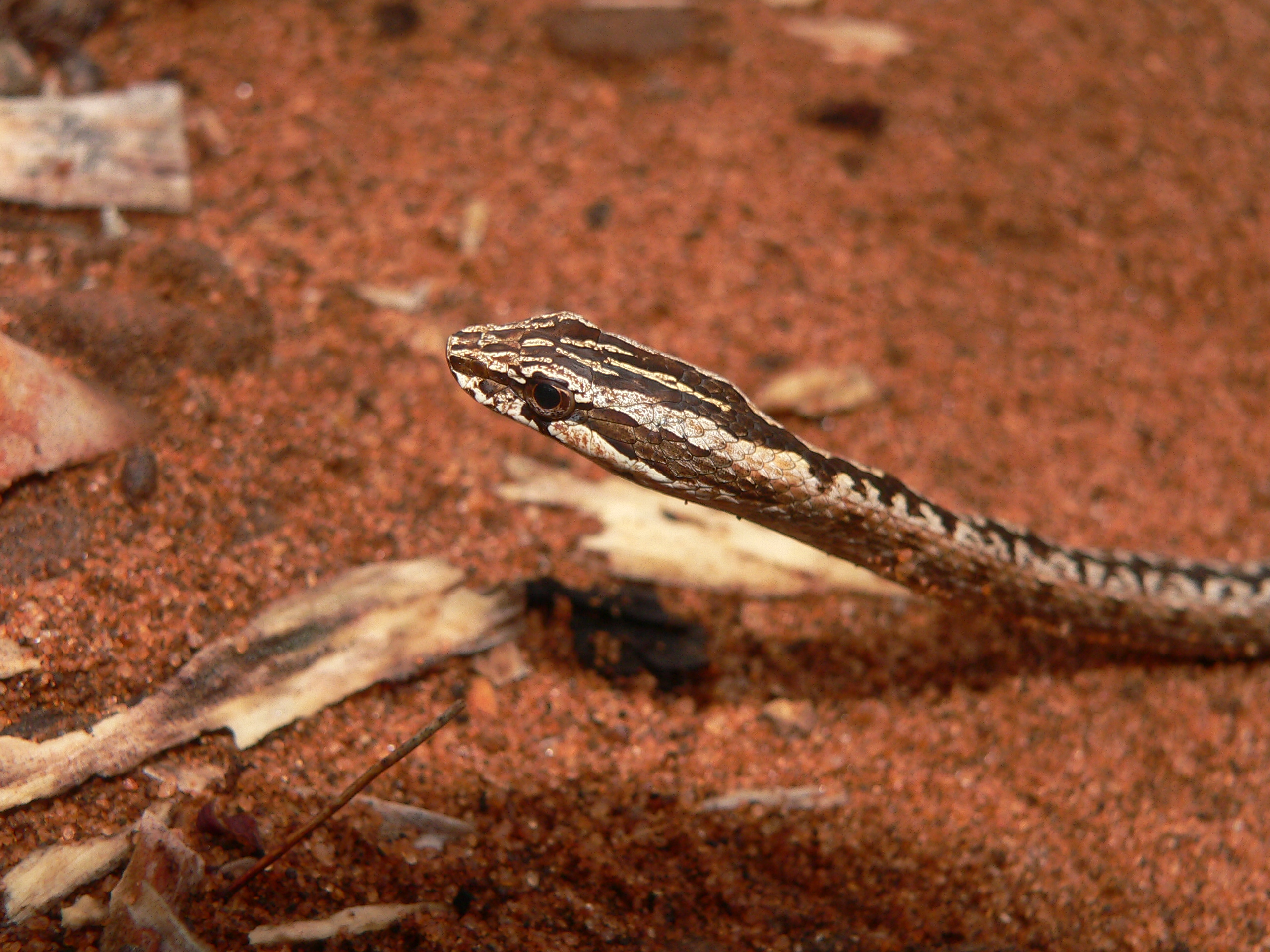

Conservation status
- Least Concern (IUCN 3.1)

Scientific classification
- Kingdom: Animalia
- Phylum: Chordata
- Class: Reptilia
- Order: Squamata
- Suborder: Serpentes
- Family: Psammophiidae
- Genus: Mimophis
- Species: M. mahfalensis

Binomial name
- Mimophis mahfalensis (Grandidier, 1867)

Synonyms
- Psammophis mahfalensis Grandidier, 1867

= Mimophis mahfalensis =

Species of snake

Mimophis mahfalensis, also known as the common big-eyed snake, is a species of snake in the family Psammophiidae. The species is endemic to Madagascar and occurs in the central and southern parts of the island. What had been considered a northern population has been split off as a separate species, Mimophis occultus.

== Subspecies ==
Two subspecies are recognized as being valid.

- Mimophis mahfalensis mahfalensis (Grandidier, 1867)
- Mimophis mahfalensis madagascariensis Günther, 1868

Nota bene: A trinomial authority in parentheses indicates that the subspecies was originally described in a genus other than Mimophis.

== Description ==
M. mahfalensis may attain a total length of 76 cm (30 in), including a tail length of 19.5 cm (7.7 in).

== Habitat ==
The preferred natural habitats of M. mahfalensis are forest, savanna, and shrubland, and it has also been found in disturbed and artificial habitats.

== Diet ==
M. mahfalensis preys upon frogs, lizards, and snakes.

== Reproduction ==
M. mahfalensis is oviparous.
