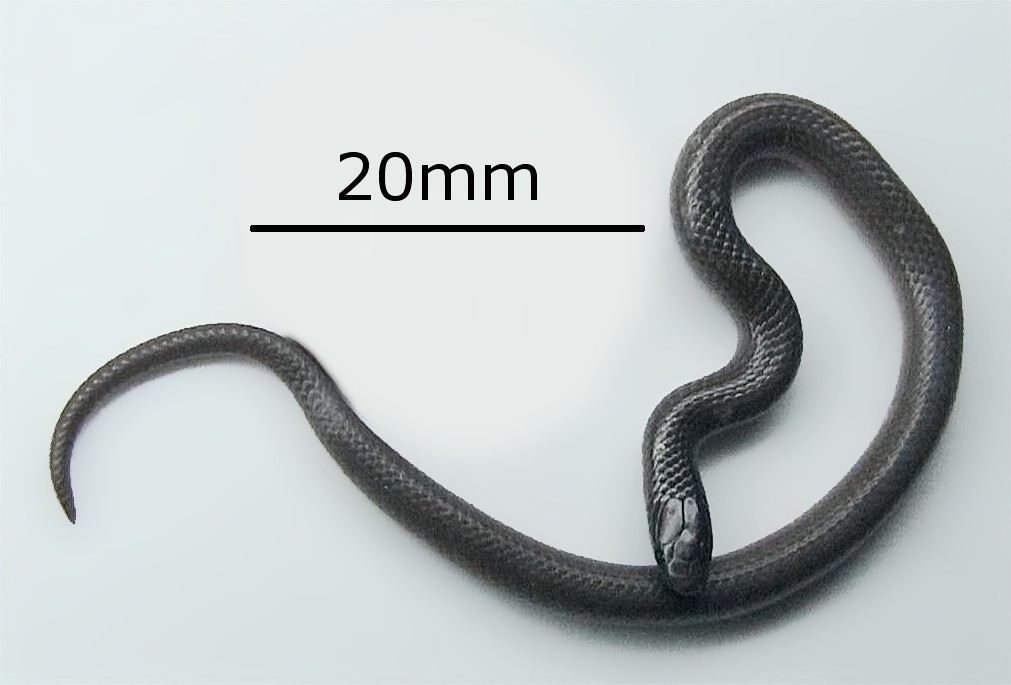

Conservation status
- Least Concern (IUCN 3.1)

Scientific classification
- Kingdom: Animalia
- Phylum: Chordata
- Class: Reptilia
- Order: Squamata
- Suborder: Serpentes
- Family: Colubridae
- Genus: Tantilla
- Species: T. gracilis

Binomial name
- Tantilla gracilis Baird & Girard, 1853

= Tantilla gracilis =

Species of snake

Tantilla gracilis (flathead snake) is a species of snake of the family Colubridae.

== Geographic range ==
The snake is found in the US states of Missouri, Texas, Kansas, Illinois, Oklahoma, Louisiana and Arkansas and in Mexico. The flathead snake is a small snake with adults growing to 18–20 cm (7–8 in). They feed on arthropods such as centipedes.
