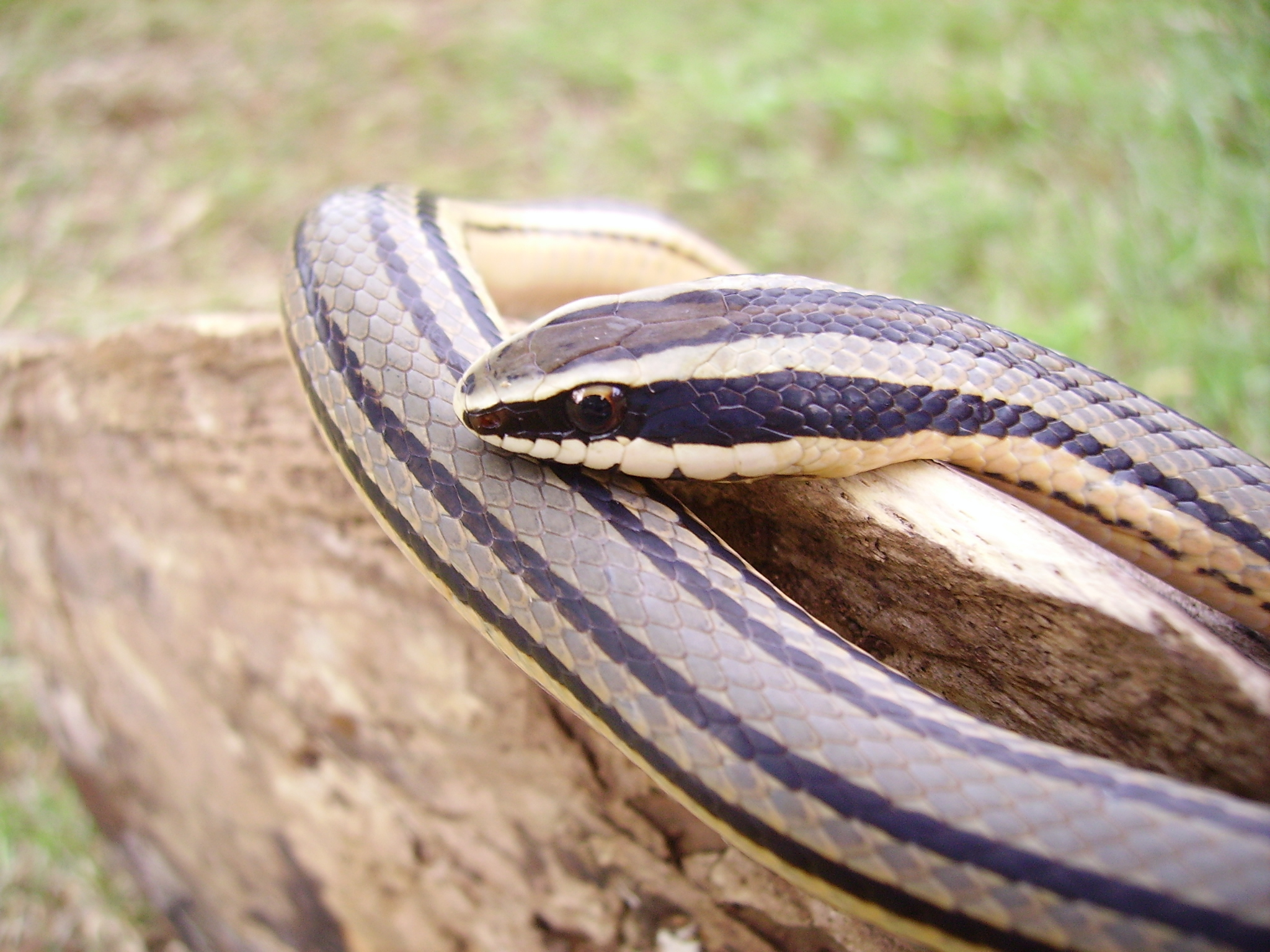

Conservation status
- Least Concern (IUCN 3.1)

Scientific classification
- Kingdom: Animalia
- Phylum: Chordata
- Class: Reptilia
- Order: Squamata
- Suborder: Serpentes
- Family: Colubridae
- Genus: Conophis
- Species: C. lineatus

Binomial name
- Conophis lineatus (A.M.C. Duméril, Bibron, & A.H.A. Duméril, 1854)
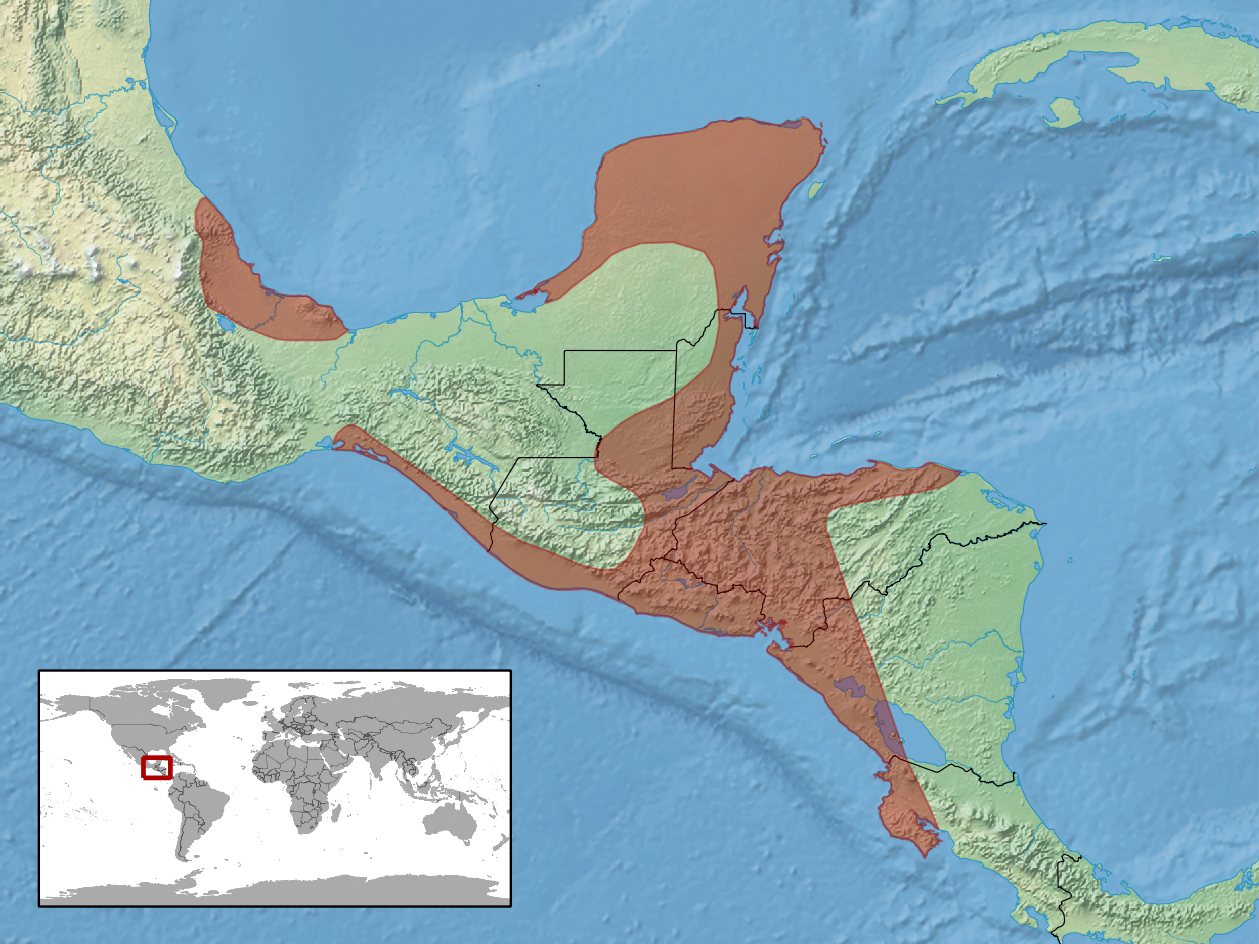

Synonyms
- Tomodon lineatum A.M.C. Duméril, Bibron & A.H.A. Duméril, 1854; Lygophis lineatus (A.M.C. Duméril, Bibron & A.H.A. Duméril, 1854); Tachymenis lineata (A.M.C. Duméril, Bibron & A.H.A. Duméril, 1854); Conophis pulcher Cope, 1869

= Conophis lineatus =

Species of snake

Conophis lineatus, also known commonly as the road guarder and la culebra guardacaminos lineada in local Spanish, is a species of mildly venomous snake in the subfamily Dipsadinae of the family Colubridae. The species is native to southern Mexico, Belize, Costa Rica, El Salvador, Guatemala, Honduras, and Nicaragua. There are two recognized subspecies.

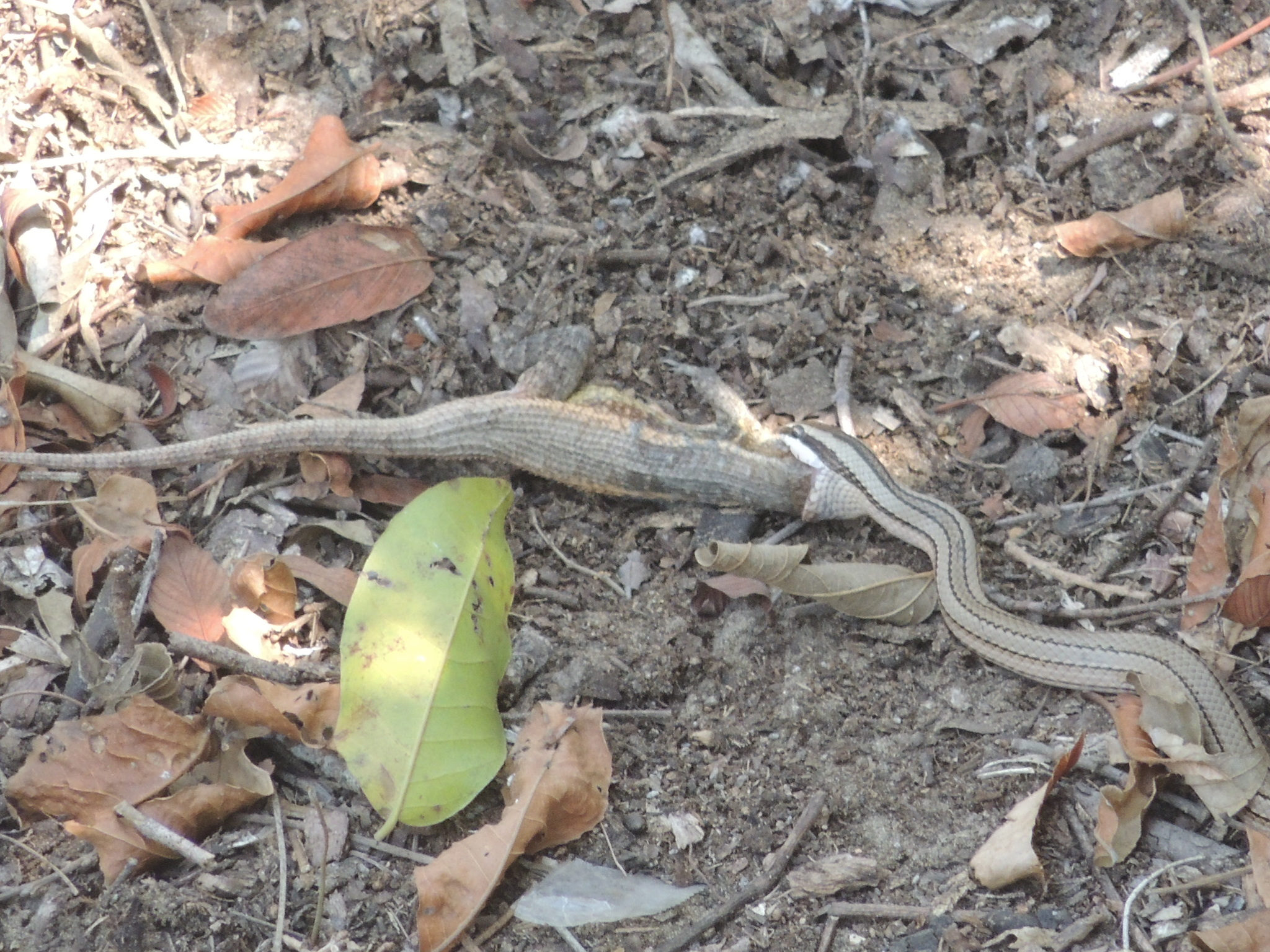
Eating a rose-bellied lizard (Sceloporus variabilis)

== Description ==
Dorsally, Conophis lineatus has 6–11 dark stripes. The areas between the stripes are tan or whitish. The lower portions of the upper labials are brown. The smooth dorsal scales are arranged in 19 rows on the neck, 19 rows at midbody, and 17 rows posteriorly.

== Habitat ==
The preferred natural habitats of Conophis lineatus are forest and savanna, but it has also been found in disturbed habitats.

== Behavior ==
Conophis lineatus is terrestrial.

== Diet ==
Conophis lineatus preys upon lizards, predominately species of the family Teiidae, and also eats eggs of ground-nesting birds.

== Venom ==
Conophis lineatus is rear-fanged and mildly venomous. Bites to humans cause pain, swellling, and bruising, with symptoms lasting as long as two months.

== Reproduction ==
Conophis lineatus is oviparous.

== Subspecies ==
Two subspecies of Conophis lineatus are recognized as being valid, including the nominotypical subspecies.

- Conophis lineatus concolor Cope, 1867
- Conophis lineatus lineatus (A.M.C. Duméril, Bibron & A.H.A. Duméril, 1854)
