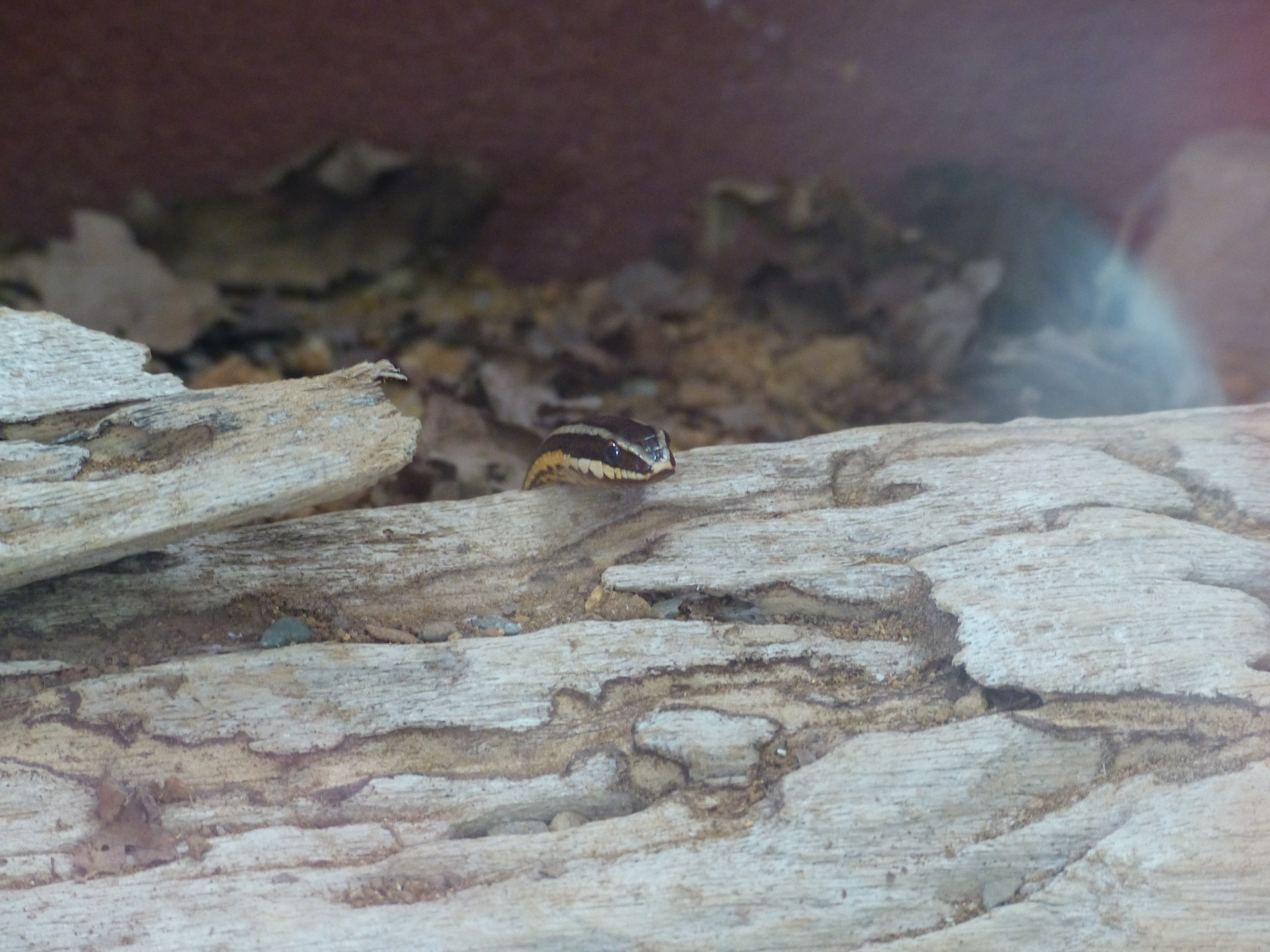
- Conophis lineatus

Scientific classification
- Kingdom: Animalia
- Phylum: Chordata
- Class: Reptilia
- Order: Squamata
- Suborder: Serpentes
- Family: Colubridae
- Subfamily: Dipsadinae
- Genus: Conophis; W. Peters, 1860

= Conophis =

Genus of snakes

Conophis is a genus of snakes in the subfamily Dipsadinae of the family Colubridae. The genus is native to Mexico and Central America.

== Species, geographic ranges and common names ==
The genus Conophis contains the following three species which are recognized as being valid.

- Conophis lineatus (A.M.C. Duméril, Bibron & A.H.A. Duméril, 1854) – Belize, Costa Rica, Guatemala, Honduras, Mexico, Nicaragua – road guarder, guarda caminos centroamericana
- Conophis morai Pérez-Higareda, López-Luna & H.M. Smith, 2002 – Mexico – Mora's road guarder, Tuxtlan road guarder, guarda caminos de Mora
- Conophis vittatus W. Peters, 1860 – Guatemala, Mexico – striped road guarder, guarda caminos listada

Nota bene: Binomial authorities in parentheses indicates that the species was originally described in a genus other than Conophis.

== Behavior and Ecology ==
Conophis species are primarily diurnal (active during the day) and terrestrial (ground-dwelling). Their diet consists mainly of:

- Lizards
- Small mammals
- Other snakes
- Frogs and toads.

They are oviparous, laying eggs to reproduce.
