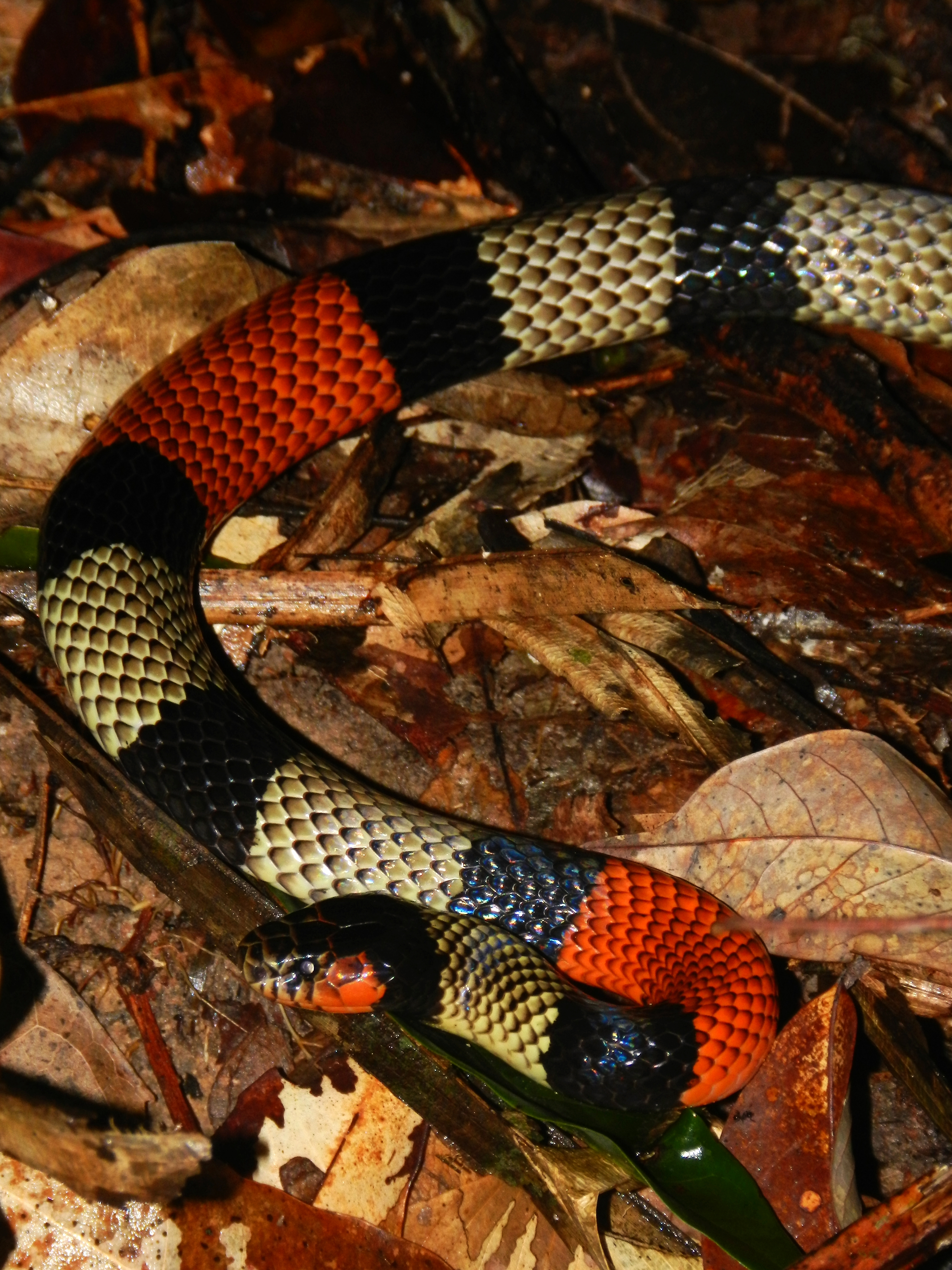

Conservation status
- Least Concern (IUCN 3.1)

Scientific classification
- Kingdom: Animalia
- Phylum: Chordata
- Class: Reptilia
- Order: Squamata
- Suborder: Serpentes
- Family: Elapidae
- Genus: Micrurus
- Species: M. spixii

Binomial name
- Micrurus spixii Wagler, 1824
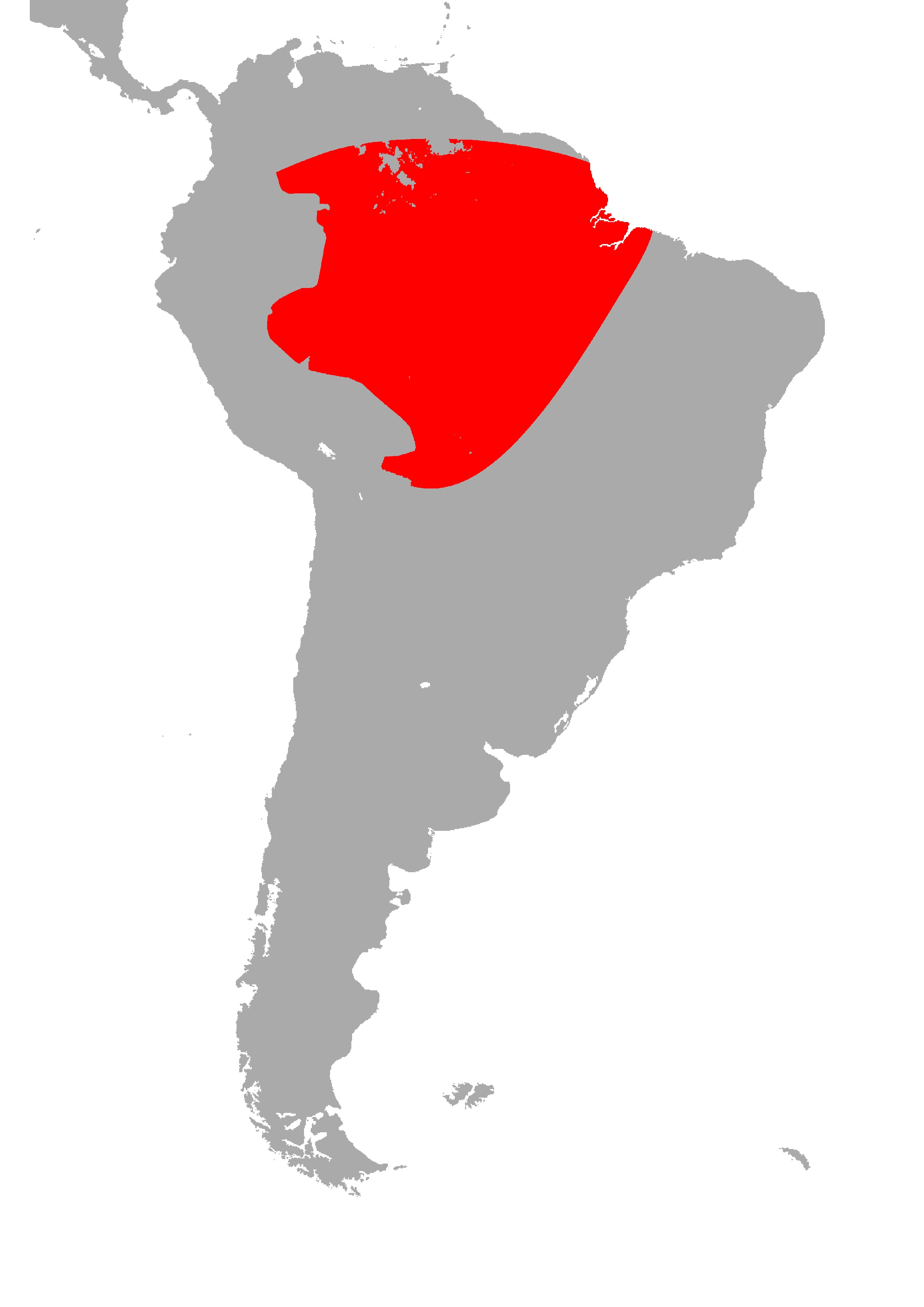

Synonyms
- Elaps spixii (Wagler, 1824); Elaps ehrhardti L. Müller, 1926

= Micrurus spixii =

Species of snake

Micrurus spixii, also known commonly as the Amazon coral snake or the Amazonian coral snake, is a species of venomous snake in the family Elapidae. The species is native to northern South America.

== Etymology ==
The specific name, spixii, is in honor of German biologist Johann Baptist von Spix.

== Description ==
Micrurus spixii is the largest species in its genus. Adults usually have a total length (tail included) of 0.8–1.2 m (2.6–3.9 ft). The maximum recorded total length is 1.6 m (5.2 ft).

The color pattern consists of triads of black rings enclosing lighter rings of white, yellow, or greenish gray. The triads are separated by red rings. The black rings are the narrowest, and the red rings are the fewest.

Males have 206–217 ventrals and 19–24 subcaudals, and females have 212–222 ventrals and 19–23 subcaudals.

== Geographic distribution ==
Micrurus spixii is found in Bolivia, northwestern Brazil, Colombia, Ecuador, and Venezuela.

== Habitat ==
The preferred natural habitats of Micrurus spixii are forest and savanna, at elevations from sea level to 800 m (2,600 ft).

== Behavior ==
Micrurus spixii is terrestrial, foraging in the leaf litter of the forest or savanna.

== Diet ==
Micrurus spixii preys upon long-bodied reptiles such as snakes, amphisbaenians, and some species of lizards.

== Reproduction ==
Micrurus spixii is oviparous.

== Mimicry ==
Micrurus spixii is mimicked by Simophis rhinostoma.

== Taxonomy ==
Micrurus spixii is the type species of the genus Micrurus.
