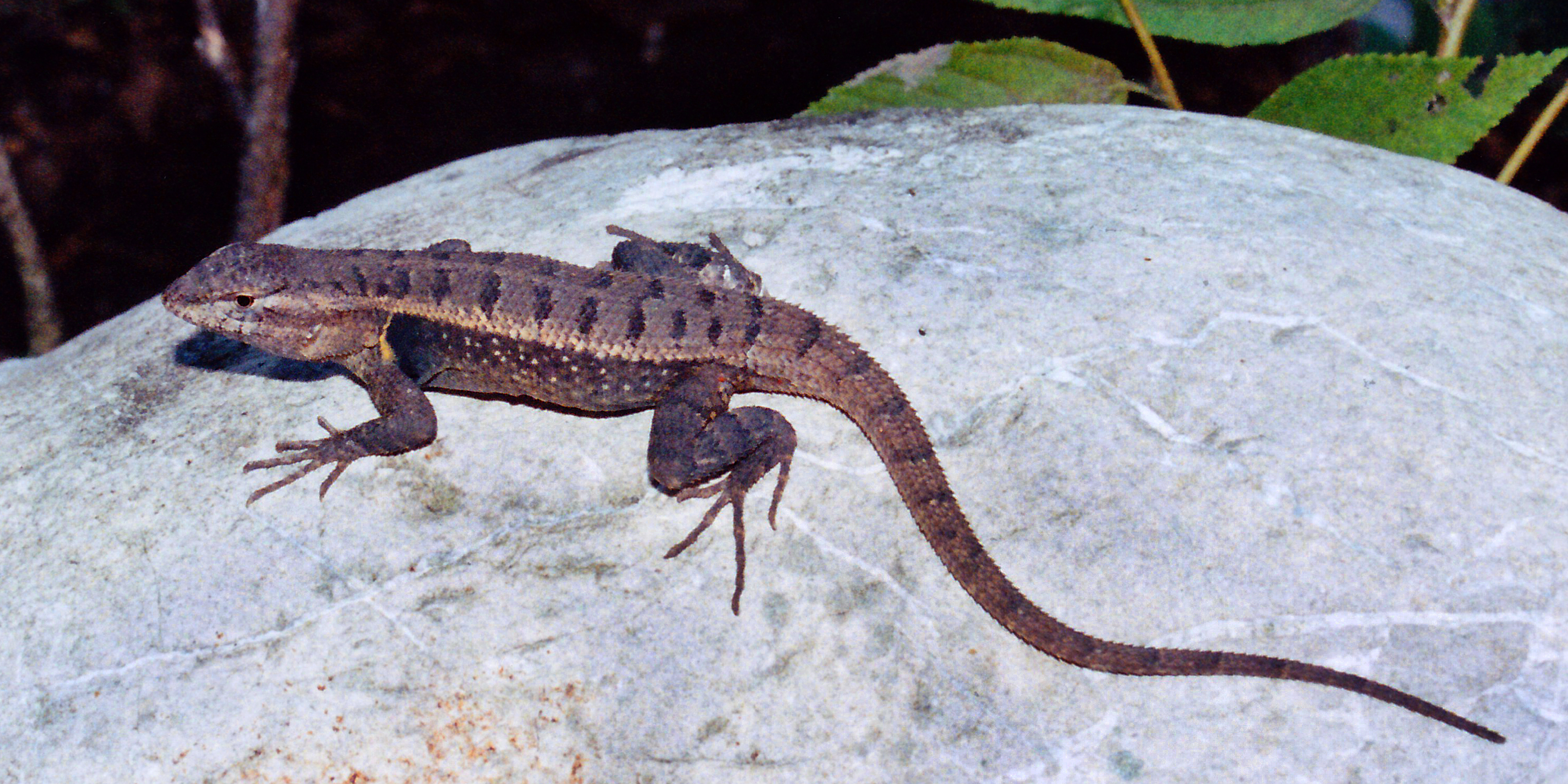

Conservation status
- Least Concern (IUCN 3.1)

Scientific classification
- Kingdom: Animalia
- Phylum: Chordata
- Class: Reptilia
- Order: Squamata
- Suborder: Iguania
- Family: Phrynosomatidae
- Genus: Sceloporus
- Species: S. variabilis

Binomial name
- Sceloporus variabilis Wiegmann, 1834

Synonyms
- Sceloporus variabilis Wiegmann, 1834; Tropidolepis variabilis — A.M.C. Duméril & Bibron, 1837; Sceloporus variabilis — Boulenger, 1885

= Sceloporus variabilis =

Species of lizard

Sceloporus variabilis, commonly known as the rose-bellied lizard, is a species of lizard in the family Phrynosomatidae. The species is found from Central America to southern Texas.

== Geographic distribution ==
Sceloporus variabilis can be found from southern Texas to northern Costa Rica, often in more arid regions.

== Habitat ==
Sceloporus variabilis is found in a variety of habitats including ocean beaches, grassland, shrubland, and forest, at elevations from sea level to 2,500 m (8,200 ft).

== Description ==
Sceloporus variabilis is one of the smaller species of the genus Sceloporus. Adults may attain a snout-to-vent length (SVL) of 54 mm (2.1 in). With an unbroken tail, it may reach a maximum total length of 140 mm (5.5 in).

Dorsally, it is tan or olive, with a double series of dark brown spots. There are two yellowish dorsolateral stripes, one at each side of the back. Males are darker on the side below the dorsolateral stripe. Ventrally, it is dirty white or yellowish. Males have a large pink blotch on each side of the belly, which is bordered with dark blue, and they also have a black mark on the axilla.

The supraoculars are small, and they are bordered medially by a row of small scales, which prevent them from contacting the median head shields. The dorsal scales are keeled, pointed, and spiny. There are 58–69 dorsal scales from the interparietal shield to the base of the tail. A postfemoral pocket is present. Males have 10–14 femoral pores.

== Diet ==
Sceloporus variabilis preys upon invertebrates.

== Reproduction ==
Sceloporus variabilis is oviparous.
