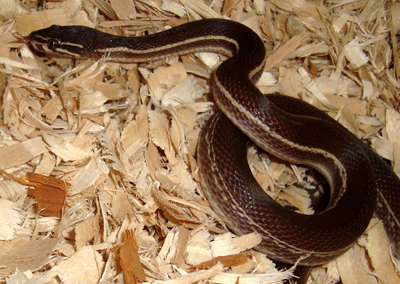
- In captivity

Scientific classification
- Domain: Eukaryota
- Kingdom: Animalia
- Phylum: Chordata
- Class: Reptilia
- Order: Squamata
- Suborder: Serpentes
- Family: Lamprophiidae
- Genus: Boaedon
- Species: B. lineatus

Binomial name
- Boaedon lineatus (Duméril & Bibron, 1854)

= Boaedon lineatus =

Striped house snake

Species of snake

Boaedon lineatus, the striped house snake, is a species of lamprophiid from all throughout Africa. This species has a wide range stretching from Tanzania through Central Africa as far as Uganda. They are kept as pets with increasing regularity, often captured and exported for the pet trade. Until November 2010, this species was grouped in the genus Lamprophis, but a paper published by Kelly et al. reclassified this species in the genus Boaedon.

== Appearance ==
This species is highly variable in appearance, their colour varying from deep black through light reddish brown and often greenish. Their eyes are large & 'bug-like' with vertically elliptical pupils. Stripes stretch from the rostral scale above the mouth through the eye to the rear of the head where they typically terminate. The species gains its name due to the thick, bold white/cream stripes which stretch laterally along the length of the body, these occasionally terminate after around two thirds of the body & may be broken or very pale. Uncommonly these stripes are totally absent. Striped house snakes are highly sexually dimorphic, females growing far larger than males, reaching lengths of around 100 centimetres (39 in) males generally smaller rarely exceeding 60 centimetres (24 in). As with all members in the genus Boaedon these snakes are highly iridescent, having an oil-on-water sheen in certain lights.

== Behaviour and diet ==
In the wild, this species is known to frequent human habitation, opportunistically feeding on the rodents that gather around human waste. They are known to feed on chicks & small lizards also. They are known to breed year-round and, unlike in captivity, breed once per year. Hatchlings are usually around 15 centimetres (5.9 in) in length. These are nocturnal in nature and are known to occur at 1000 feet above sea level.

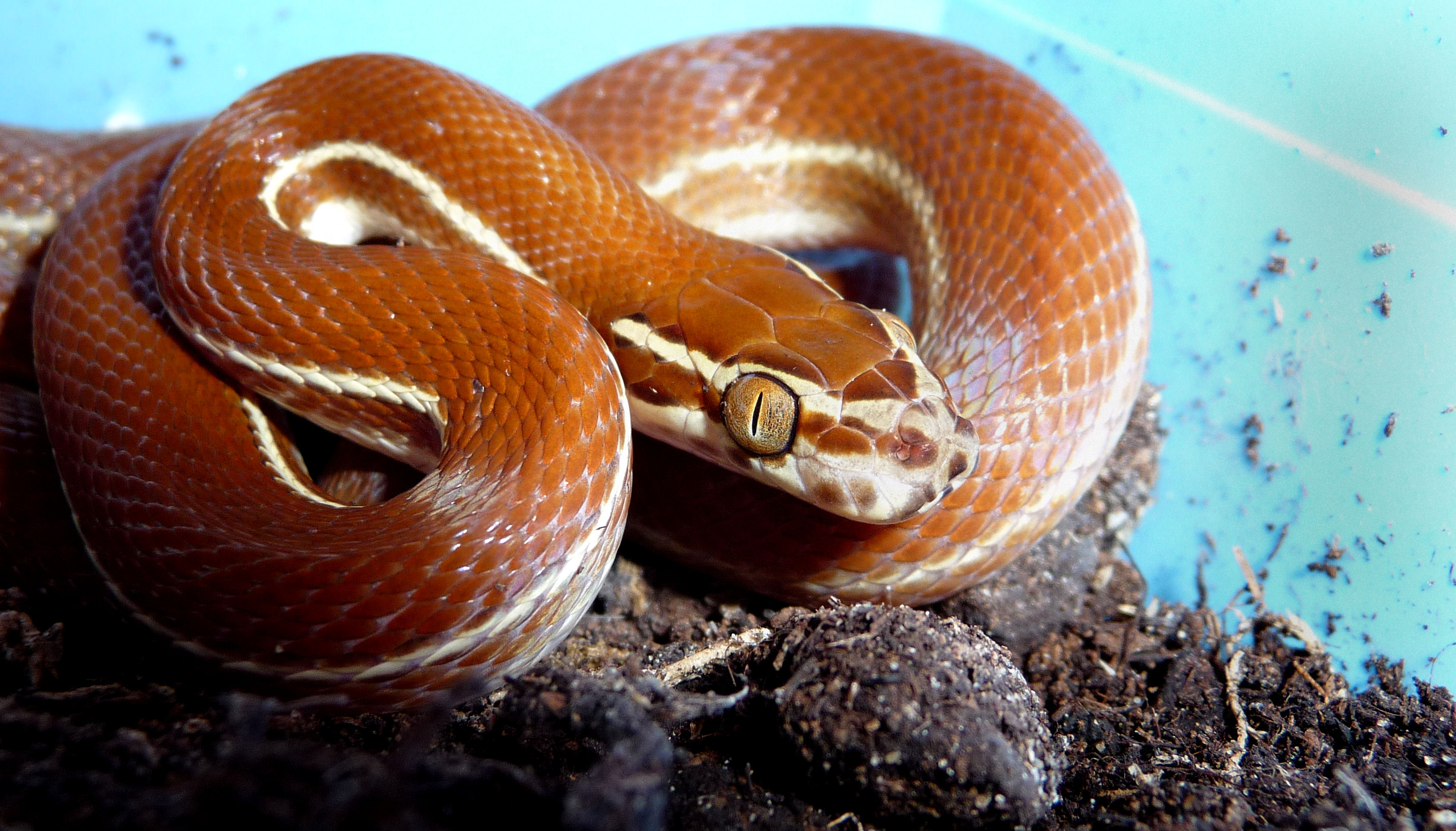
Boaedon lineatus showing red colouration typical of some localities.

== In captivity ==
This species is increasingly more common in captivity with more individuals beginning to keep and breed them. They are often imported from Tanzania as Wild Caught or Captive Farmed individuals. No known genetically inheritable mutations are currently available. This species fares well in captivity, with some TLC they feed well on defrosted rodents & breed, laying 3–6 clutches of around 3–10 eggs per year. Care is basic & in time, as they become more readily available, this species should grow in popularity.
