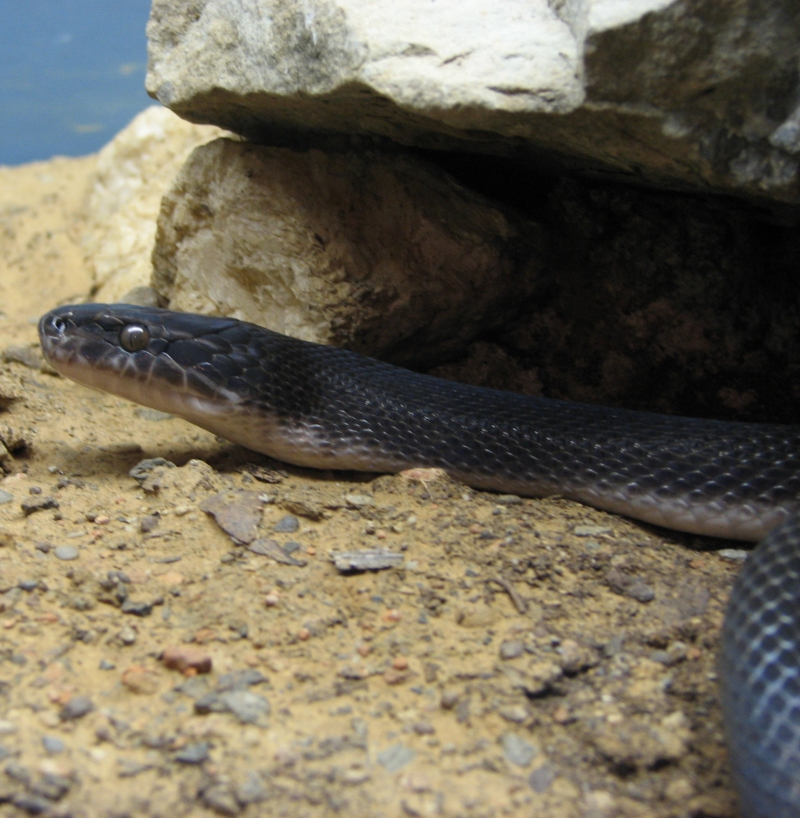

Conservation status
- Least Concern (IUCN 3.1)

Scientific classification
- Kingdom: Animalia
- Phylum: Chordata
- Class: Reptilia
- Order: Squamata
- Suborder: Serpentes
- Family: Lamprophiidae
- Genus: Boaedon
- Species: B. fuliginosus

Binomial name
- Boaedon fuliginosus Boulenger, 1893)

= African house snake =

Species of snake

The African house snake (Boaedon fuliginosus) is a species of snake of the family Lamprophiidae. Harmless to humans, it is widely kept and bred in captivity as a pet by herpetoculturists due to its small size, placid demeanor and easy care requirements.

== Geographic range ==
The snake is found in Africa, mainly preferring relatively drier areas as habitat.
