= List of dangerous snakes =

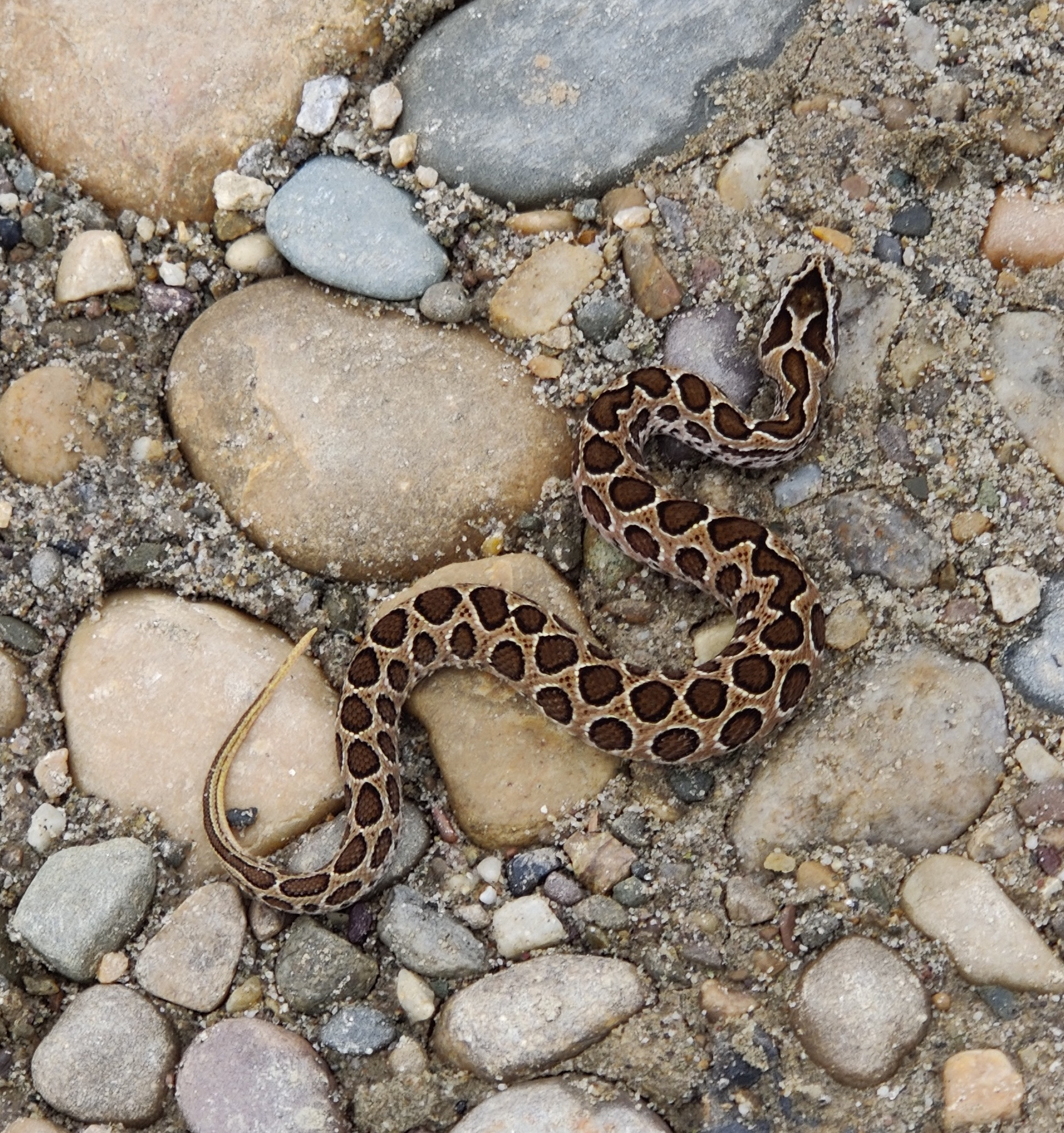
Medically significant human snakebite cases on the Indian subcontinent are usually a result of an encounter with one of the "big four", such as this Russell's viper

As of 2025, there are 3,971 known snake species worldwide, with around 600 venomous species. This is an overview of the snakes that pose a significant health risk to humans, through snakebites or other physical trauma.

The varieties of snakes that most often cause serious snakebites depend on the region of the world. In Africa, the most dangerous species include black mambas, puff adders, and carpet vipers. In the Middle East, the species of greatest concern are carpet vipers and elapids; in Central and South America, Bothrops (including the terciopelo or fer-de-lance) and Crotalus (rattlesnakes) are of greatest concern. In South Asia, it has historically been believed that Indian cobras, common kraits, Russell's viper, and carpet vipers were the most dangerous species; however, other snakes may also cause significant problems in this region. While several species of snakes may cause more bodily harm than others, any one of these venomous snakes is still very capable of causing a human fatality should a bite go untreated, regardless of venom capabilities or behavioral tendencies.

== Most venomous species ==
The median lethal dose (LD_{50}) of a venom is the dose required to kill half the members of a tested population after a specified test duration. A lower LD_{50} number indicates increased toxicity.

There are four methods for administering the LD_{50} test:

Subcutaneous: Venom is injected into the fatty layer beneath the skin.
Intravenous: Venom is injected directly into a vein.
Intramuscular: Venom is injected into a muscle.
Intraperitoneal: Venom is injected into the abdominal cavity.

The most commonly tested methods are subcutaneous and intravenous injections, using mice. Subcutaneous is the most applicable to actual bites: Only large Bitis or extremely large Bothrops or Crotalus specimens are able to deliver a bite that is truly intramuscular, and intravenous injections are extremely rare in actual bites. Mixing dry venom with 0.1% bovine serum albumin in saline gives more consistent test results than mixing with saline alone.

Wayne C Hodgson et al. stated in 2002: "Historically, the lethality of snake venoms has been based on murine LD50 studies. Due to ethical reasons, these studies are being superseded by in vitro studies. Instead, the time taken to produce 90% inhibition of nerve-mediated twitches (i.e. t90) in skeletal muscle preparations can be determined".

World's most venomous snakes
Snake	Region	subcutaneous injection LD_{50} 0.1% bovine serum albumin in Saline	subcutaneous injection LD_{50} Saline	intravenous injection LD_{50}
Inland taipan	Inland, central Australia	0.01 mg/kg	0.025 mg/kg	0.013 mg/kg
Dubois' sea snake	Tropical oceanic waters	N/A	0.044 mg/kg	N/A
Eastern brown snake	Australia, Papua New Guinea, Indonesia	0.041 mg/kg	0.053 mg/kg	0.01 mg/kg
Yellow-bellied sea snake	Tropical oceanic waters	N/A	0.067 mg/kg	N/A
Central Ranges taipan	Inland, central Australia	N/A	0.075 mg/kg	N/A
Peron's sea snake	Gulf of Siam, Strait of Taiwan, Coral sea islands, and other places	N/A	0.079 mg/kg	N/A
Coastal taipan	Australia	0.064 mg/kg	0.099 mg/kg	0.013 mg/kg (0.002 mg/kg for pure taipoxin)
Many-banded krait	Hong Kong, Mainland China, Taiwan, Vietnam, Laos, Burma	N/A	0.09 mg/kg	0.113 mg/kg
Black-banded sea krait	Eastern coast of the Malay Peninsula and Brunei, and in Halmahera, Indonesia.	N/A	0.111 mg/kg	N/A
Beaked sea snake	Tropical Indo-Pacific	0.164 mg/kg	0.1125 mg/kg	N/A
Black tiger snake	Australia	0.099 mg/kg	0.131 mg/kg	N/A
Western tiger snake	Australia	0.124 mg/kg	0.194 mg/kg	N/A

== Medically significant species ==
Mortality (often determined by measured toxicity on mice) is a commonly used indicator of the danger of any given venomous snake, but important too are efficiency of venom delivery, venom yield, and behavior upon encountering humans. Given these additional, practical concerns, many snake experts have cited the black mamba and the coastal taipan as the world's most dangerous snakes – even though their venoms, drop for drop, are not the most lethal. Both species are elapids, and in several aspects of morphology, ecology and behavior, the coastal taipan is strongly convergent with the black mamba.

=== Black mamba ===
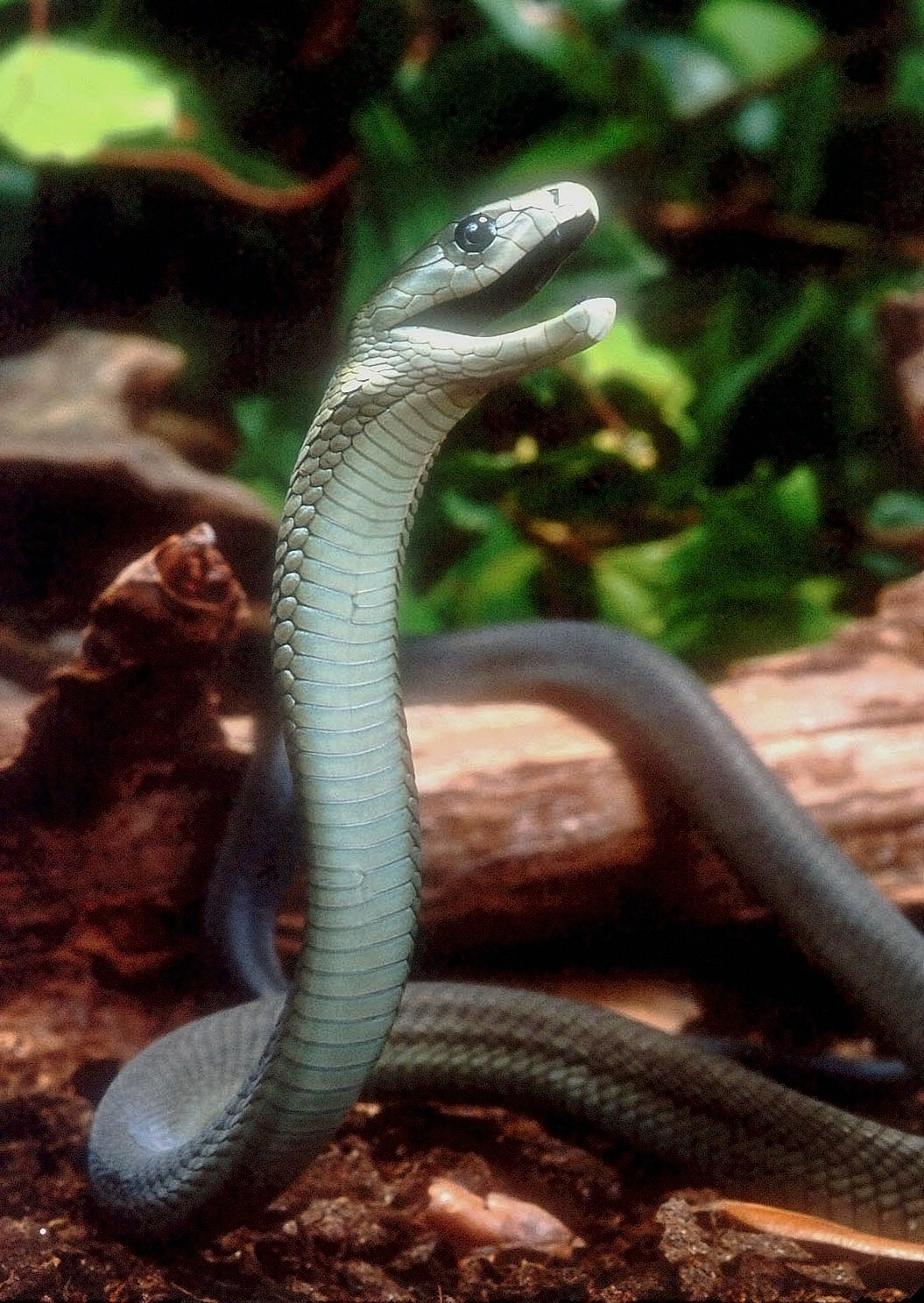
Black mamba (Dendroaspis polylepis)

The black mamba (Dendroaspis polylepis) is a large and highly venomous snake species native to much of Sub-Saharan Africa. It is the second-longest venomous snake species in the world and is the fastest-moving land snake, capable of moving at 4.3 to 5.4 metres per second (16–20 km/h, 10–12 mph). Its venom is highly toxic and bites on humans are rapidly fatal. The black mamba is classified as a snake of medical importance by the World Health Organization. (Note: Snakes of Medical Importance include those with highly dangerous venom resulting in high rates of morbidity and mortality, or those that are common agents in snakebite.)

This species of snake shows tenacity, fearlessness, and aggression when cornered or threatened, during breeding season, or when defending its territory. They are also known to have up to a 100% rate of envenomation; the probability of dry bites (no venom injected) in black mamba strikes is almost non-existent. The venom of the black mamba is a protein of low molecular weight and as a result is able to spread rapidly within the bitten tissue. The venom is the most rapid-acting venom of any snake species and consists mainly of highly potent neurotoxins; it also contains cardiotoxins, fasciculins, and calciseptine.

Based on the median lethal dose (LD_{50}) values in mice, the black mamba LD_{50} from all published sources is as follows:

- (SC) subcutaneous (most applicable to real bites): 0.32 mg/kg, 0.28 mg/kg.
- (IV) intravenous: 0.25 mg/kg, 0.011 mg/kg.
- (IP) intraperitoneal: 0.30 mg/kg (average), 0.941 mg/kg. 0.05 mg/kg (the last quote does not make it clear if it is either intravenous or intraperitoneal).

It is estimated that only 10 to 15 mg will kill a human adult; however, its bites deliver about 120 mg of venom on average, although they may deliver up to 400 mg of venom in a single bite. Severe neurotoxicity invariably ensues rapidly. This is because of several factors, including the high potency of the venom, and the unusual composition of synergistic toxins contained within the venom, which bring on severe symptoms of envenomation and death much faster than any other snake venom. In addition, the snake itself possesses the most advanced, evolved, and efficient venom delivery apparatus among all venomous snakes, and the most advanced and evolved dentition of all elapids. Black mambas possess the longest fangs of any elapid, which average around 13.1 millimeters (0.52 in), but may grow as long as 22 millimeters (0.87 in). Another feature that distinguishes the dentition and venom delivery apparatus of this species from all other elapids, as well as other species of venomous snake including those of the family Viperidae, is that the fangs are positioned well forward at the most anterior position possible in its mouth – right up in the front of the upper jaw.

The proteins in black mamba venom are of low molecular weight, low viscosity, and the venom's high activity in terms of hyaluronidases, which is also essential in facilitating dispersion of venom toxins throughout tissue (spreading the venom through the body) by catalyzing the hydrolysis of hyaluronan, a constituent of the extracellular matrix (ECM), hyaluronidase lowers the viscosity of hyaluronan, and Dendroaspin natriuretic peptide (DNP), a newly discovered component of mamba venom, is the most potent natriuretic peptide and is unique to the genus Dendroaspis, or mambas. It is a polypeptide analogous to the human atrial natriuretic peptide; it is responsible for causing diuresis through natriuresis and dilating the vessel bloodstream, which results in, among other effects, acceleration of venom distribution in the body of the victim, thereby increasing tissue permeability. These advanced and highly evolved physical and biological features combined with this species' large size, territorial behavior, and quickness make the black mamba a terrifying adversary. Neurological, respiratory, and cardiovascular symptoms rapidly begin to manifest, usually within less than ten minutes. Common symptoms are rapid onset of dizziness, drowsiness, headache, coughing or difficulty breathing, convulsions, and an erratic heartbeat. Other common symptoms which come on rapidly include neuromuscular symptoms, shock, loss of consciousness, hypotension, pallor, ataxia, excessive salivation (oral secretions may become profuse and thick), limb paralysis, nausea and vomiting, ptosis, fever, and severe abdominal pain. Local tissue damage appears to be relatively infrequent and of minor severity in most cases of black mamba envenomation. Edema is typically minimal. Acute kidney injury has been reported in a few cases of black mamba bites in humans as well as in animal models. Death is due to suffocation resulting from paralysis of the respiratory muscles.

Untreated black mamba bites have a mortality rate of 100%. Antivenom therapy is the mainstay of treatment for black mamba envenomation. A polyvalent antivenom produced by the South African Institute for Medical Research (SAIMR) is used to treat all black mamba bites from different localities. Because of the availability of antivenom, a bite from a black mamba no longer results in certain death, but in order for the antivenom therapy to be successful, vigorous treatment and large doses of antivenom must be administered rapidly post-envenomation. In case studies of black mamba envenomation, respiratory paralysis has occurred in less than 15 minutes. Envenomation by this species invariably causes severe neurotoxicity because black mambas often strike repeatedly in a single lunge. The doses of antivenom required are often massive (10–30+ vials) for bites from this species. Although antivenom saves many lives, mortality due to black mamba envenomation is still at 14%, even with antivenom treatment. In addition to antivenom treatment, endotracheal intubation and mechanical ventilation are required for supportive therapy.

=== Coastal taipan ===
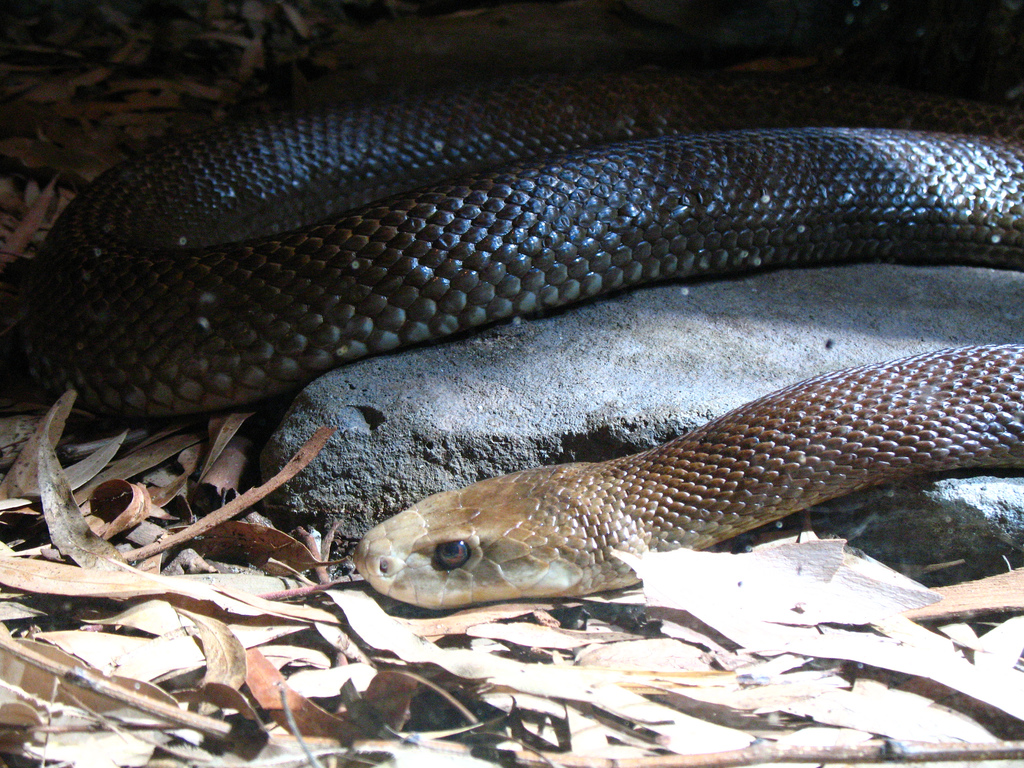
Coastal taipan (Oxyuranus scutellatus) at Taronga Zoo

The coastal taipan (Oxyuranus scutellatus) is a large, highly venomous elapid, whose range includes the southern parts of the island of New Guinea and extends in an arc along the east coast of Australia from northeastern New South Wales through Queensland and across the northern parts of the Northern Territory to northern Western Australia. This snake can be highly aggressive when cornered and will actively defend itself. They are extremely nervous and alert snakes, and any movement near them is likely to trigger an attack. When threatened, this species adopts a loose striking stance with its head and forebody raised. It inflates and compresses its body laterally (not dorso-ventrally like many other species) and may also spread the back of its jaws to give the head a broader, lance-shaped appearance. In this position the snake will strike without much provocation, inflicting multiple bites with extreme accuracy and efficiency. The muscular lightweight body of the taipan allows it to hurl itself forwards or sideways and reach high off the ground, and such is the speed of the attack that a person may be bitten several times before realizing the snake is there.

This snake is considered to be one of the most venomous in the world. Ernst and Zug et al. (1996) and the Australian venom and toxin database both list an LD_{50} value of 0.106 mg/kg for subcutaneous injection. Engelmann and Obst (1981) list a value of 0.12 mg/kg SC, with an average venom yield of 120 mg per bite and a maximum record of 400 mg. To demonstrate just how deadly this species is, an estimate was made on the number of mice and adult human fatalities it is capable of causing in a single bite that yields the maximum dose of 400 mg. Based on the study by Ernst and Zug et al. 1996, which listed the LD_{50} of the coastal taipan at 0.106 mg SC and a venom yield of 400 mg, this would be sufficient to kill 208,019 mice and 59 adult humans in a single bite that delivers 400 mg of venom. The venom apparatus of this species is well developed. The fangs are the longest of any Australian elapid snake, being up to 1.2 cm (0.5 in) long, and are able to be brought forward slightly when a strike is contemplated. Coastal taipans can inject large amounts of highly toxic venom deep into the tissue. Its venom contains primarily taicatoxin, a highly potent neurotoxin known to cause hemolytic and coagulopathic reactions.

The venom affects the nervous system and the blood's ability to clot, and bite victims may experience headache, nausea and vomiting, collapse, convulsions (especially in children), paralysis, internal bleeding, myolysis (destruction of muscle tissue) and kidney damage. In a single study done in Papua New Guinea, 166 patients with enzyme immunoassay-proven bites by Papuan taipans (Oxyuranus scutellatus canni) were studied in Port Moresby, Papua New Guinea. Of the 166 bite victims, 139 (84%) showed clinical evidence of envenoming: local signs were trivial, but the majority developed hemostatic disorders and neurotoxicity. The blood of 77% of the patients was incoagulable and 35% bled spontaneously, usually from the gums. Microhematuria was observed in 51% of the patients. Neurotoxic symptoms (ptosis, ophthalmoplegia, bulbar paralysis, and peripheral muscular weakness) developed in 85%. Endotracheal intubation was required in 42% and mechanical ventilation by 37%. Electrocardiographic (ECG or EKG) abnormalities were found in 52% of a group of 69 unselected patients. Specific antivenom raised against Australian taipan venom was effective in stopping spontaneous systemic bleeding and restoring blood coagulability but, in most cases, it neither reversed nor prevented the evolution of paralysis even when given within a few hours of the bite. However, early antivenom treatment was associated statistically with decreased incidence and severity of neurotoxic signs. The low case fatality rate of 4.3% is attributable mainly to the use of mechanical ventilation, a technique rarely available in Papua New Guinea. Earlier use of increased doses of antivenoms of improved specificity might prove more effective. The onset of symptoms is often rapid, and a bite from this species is a life-threatening medical emergency. Prior to the introduction of specific antivenom by the Commonwealth Serum Laboratories in 1956, a coastal taipan bite was nearly always fatal. In case of severe envenomation, death can occur as early as 30 minutes after being bitten, but average death time after a bite is around 3–6 hours and it is variable, depending on various factors such as the nature of the bite and the health state of the victim. Envenomation rate is very high: over 80% of bites inject venom. The mortality rate among untreated bite victims is nearly 100%.

=== The Big Four ===
The Big Four are the four venomous snake species responsible for causing the most snake bite cases on the Indian subcontinent (mostly in India). The Big Four snakes cause more snakebites than other species because they are more abundant in highly populated areas. They are the Indian cobra (Naja naja), common krait (Bungarus caeruleus), Russell's viper (Daboia russelii) and the saw-scaled viper (Echis carinatus). The species were originally given the name "The Big Four" by physicians, herpetologists, and other wildlife experts as they were the main focus of medical research during the production of antivenom.

==== Indian cobra ====
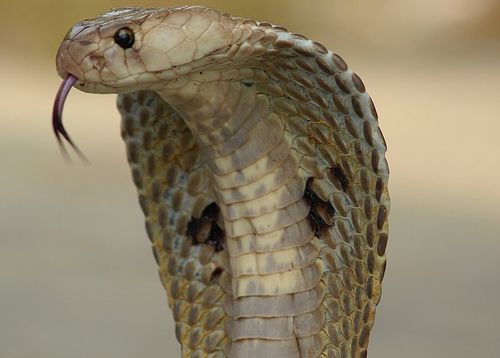
Indian cobra (Naja naja)

The Indian cobra (Naja naja) is a moderately venomous species, but has a rapid-acting venom. In mice, the SC LD_{50} for this species is 0.80 mg/kg and the average venom yield per bite is between 169 and 250 mg. Though it is responsible for many bites, only a small percentage are fatal if proper medical treatment and antivenom are given. The mortality rate for untreated bite victims can vary from case to case, depending upon the quantity of venom delivered and by the individual involved. According to one study, it is approximately 15–20% but in another study, with 1,224 bite cases, the mortality rate was only 6.5%. Estimated fatalities as a result of this species is approximately 15,000 per year, but they are responsible for an estimated 100,000–150,000 non-fatal bites per year.

==== Common krait ====
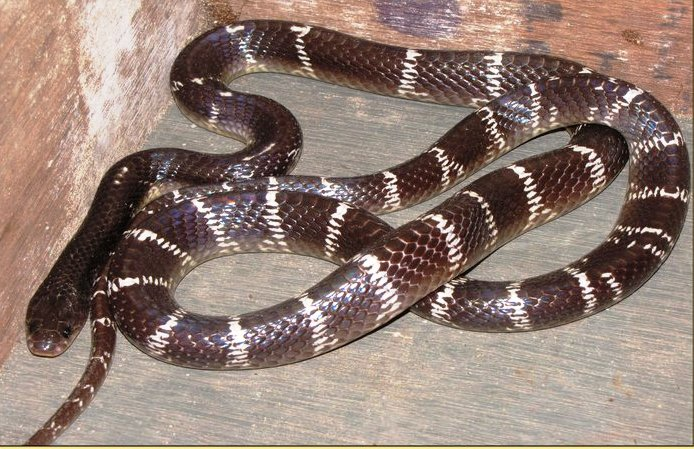
Common krait (Bungarus caeruleus)

The common krait (Bungarus caeruleus) is often considered to be the most dangerous snake species in India. Its venom consists mostly of powerful neurotoxins which induce muscle paralysis. Clinically, its venom contains presynaptic and postsynaptic neurotoxins. Due to the fact that krait venom contains many presynaptic neurotoxins, patients bitten will often not respond to antivenom because once paralysis has developed it is not reversible. This species causes an estimated 10,000 fatalities per year in India alone. There is a 70–80% mortality rate in cases where there is no possible or poor and ineffective treatment (e.g., no use of mechanical ventilation, low quantities of antivenom, poor management of possible infection). Average venom yield per bite is 10 mg (Brown, 1973), 8 to 20 mg (dry weight) (U.S. Dept. Navy, 1968), and 8 to 12 mg (dry weight) (Minton, 1974). The lethal adult human dose is 2.5 mg. In mice, the LD_{50} values of its venom are 0.365 mg/kg SC, 0.169 mg/kg IV and 0.089 mg/kg IP.

==== Russell's viper ====
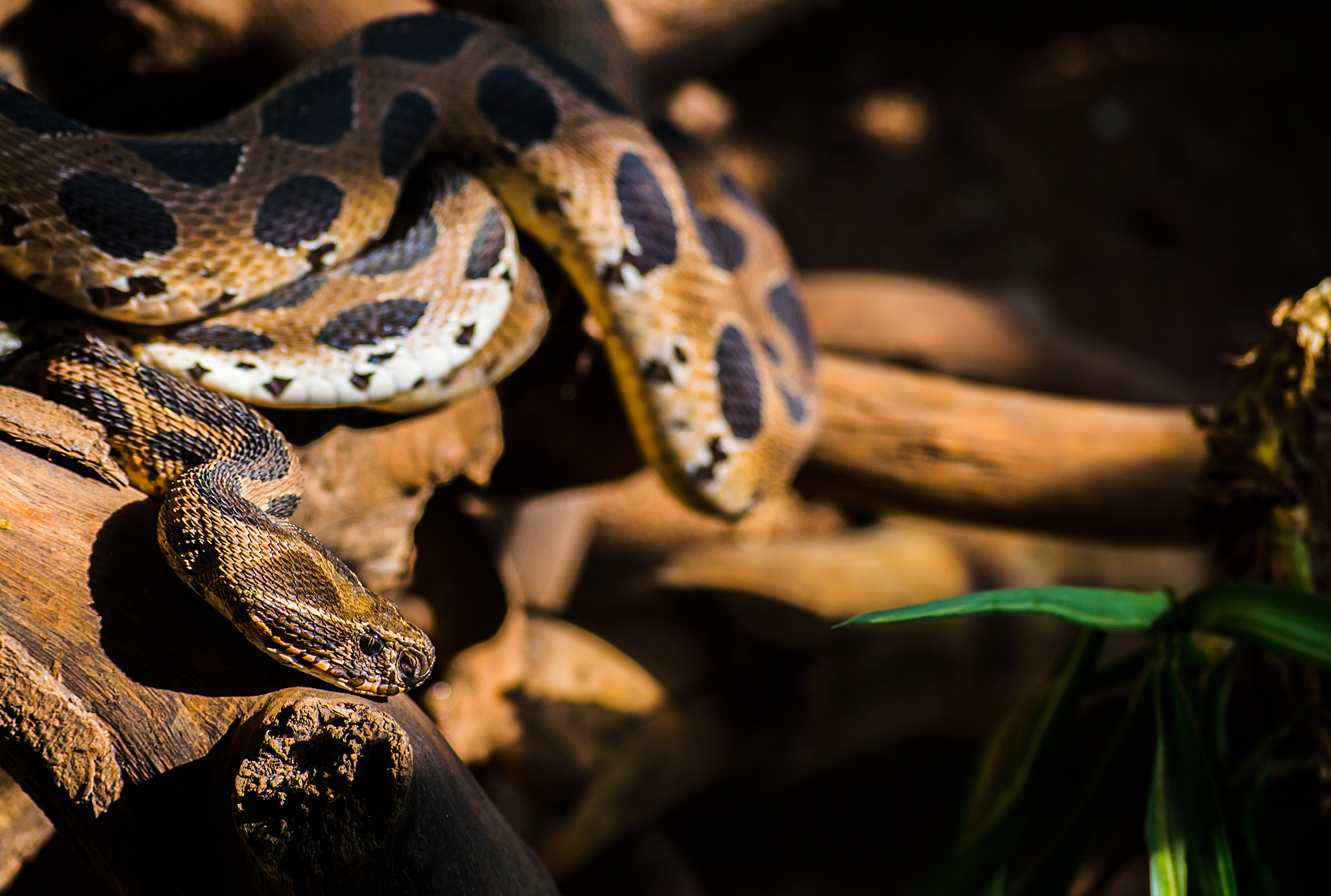
Russell's viper (Daboia russelii)

Russell's viper (Daboia russelii) produces one of the most excruciatingly painful bites of all venomous snakes. Internal bleeding is common. Bruising, blistering and necrosis may appear relatively quickly as well. The Russell's viper, although usually slow and sluggish and shunning humans in general, may resort to striking at a lightning speed when provoked beyond a certain limit. This species is responsible for more human fatalities in India than any other snake species, causing an estimated 25,000 fatalities annually. The LD_{50} in mice is 0.133 mg/kg intravenous, 0.40 mg/kg intraperitoneal, and about 0.75 mg/kg subcutaneous. For most humans, a lethal dose is approximately 40–70 mg. The quantity of venom produced by individual specimens is considerable, with reported venom yields for adult specimens ranging from 130–250 mg to 150–250 mg to 21–268 mg. For 13 juveniles with an average length of 79 cm, the average venom yield was 8–79 mg (mean 45 mg).

==== Saw-scaled viper ====
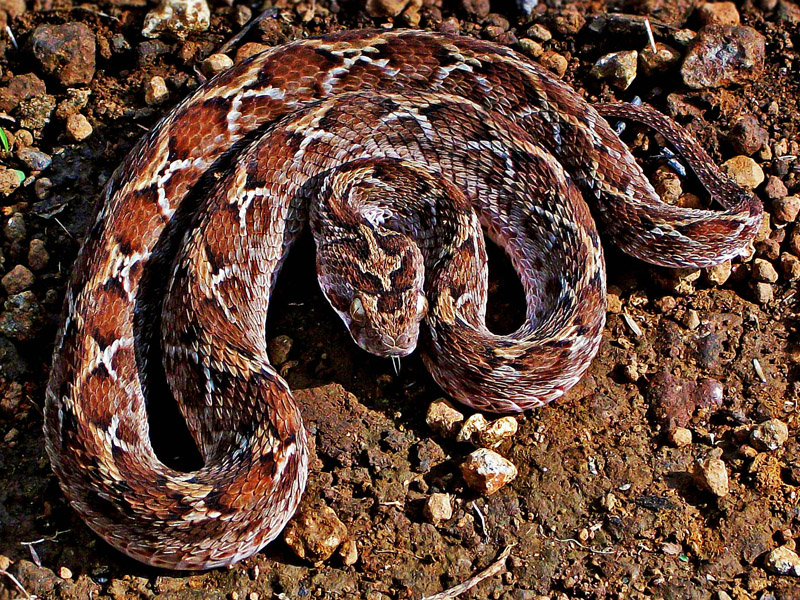
Saw-scaled viper (Echis carinatus)

The saw-scaled viper (Echis carinatus) is small, but its unpredictability, aggressive temper, and lethal venom potency make it very dangerous. This species is one of the fastest striking snakes in the world, and mortality rates for those bitten are very high. In India alone, the saw-scaled viper is responsible for an estimated 5,000 human fatalities annually. However, because it ranges from Pakistan, India (in rocky regions of Maharashtra, Rajasthan, Uttar Pradesh and Punjab), Sri Lanka, parts of the Middle East and Africa north of the equator, is believed to cause more human fatalities every year than any other snake species. In drier regions of the African continent, such as the Sahel and savannas, the saw-scaled vipers inflict up to 90% of all bites. The rate of envenomation is over 80%. The saw-scaled viper also produces a particularly painful bite. This species produces on the average of about 18 mg of dry venom by weight, with a recorded maximum of 72 mg. It may inject as much as 12 mg, whereas the lethal dose for an adult human is estimated to be only 5 mg.

Envenomation results in local symptoms as well as severe systemic symptoms that may prove fatal. Local symptoms include swelling and intense pain, which appear within minutes of a bite. In very bad cases the swelling may extend up the entire affected limb within 12–24 hours and blisters form on the skin. Of the more dangerous systemic symptoms, hemorrhage and coagulation defects are the most striking. Hematemesis, melena, hemoptysis, hematuria and epistaxis also occur and may lead to hypovolemic shock. Almost all patients develop oliguria or anuria within a few hours to as late as 6 days post bite. In some cases, kidney dialysis is necessary due to acute kidney injury, but this is not often caused by hypotension. It is more often the result of intravascular hemolysis, which occurs in about half of all cases. In other cases, ARF is often caused by disseminated intravascular coagulation.

=== Terciopelo ===
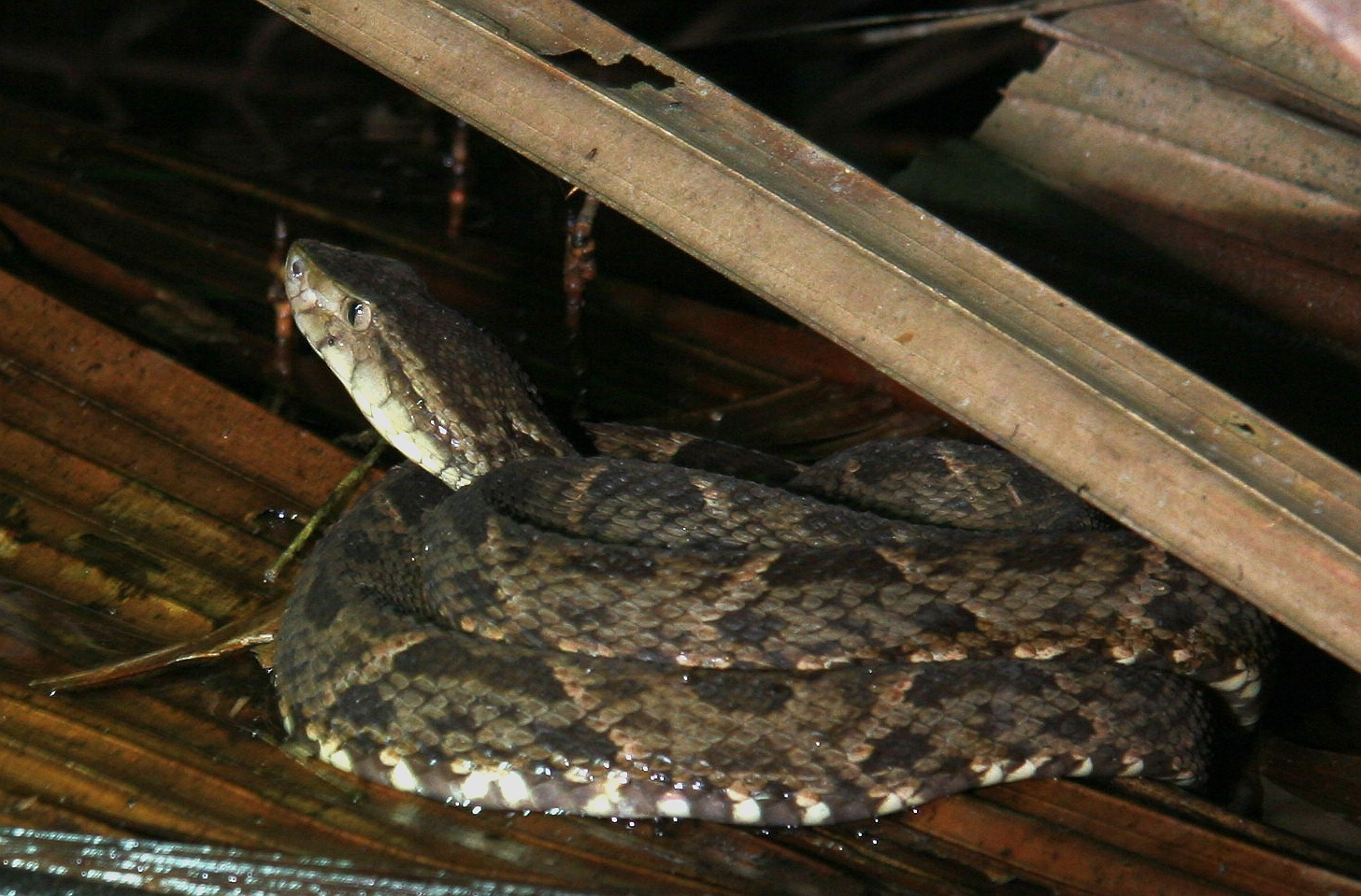
Terciopelo (Bothrops asper)

The Terciopelo (Bothrops asper) has been described as excitable and unpredictable when disturbed. They can, and often will, move very quickly, usually opting to flee from danger, but can suddenly reverse direction to vigorously defend themselves. Adult specimens, when cornered and fully alert, should be considered dangerous. In a review of bites from this species suffered by field biologists, Hardy (1994) referred to it as the "ultimate pit viper". Venom yield (dry weight) averages 458 mg, with a maximum of 1530 mg (Bolaños, 1984) and an LD_{50} in mice of 2.844 mg/kg IP. This species is an important cause of snakebite within its range. It is considered the most dangerous snake in Costa Rica, responsible for 46% of all bites and 30% of all hospitalized cases; before 1947, the fatality rate was 7%, but this has since declined to almost 0% (Bolaños, 1984), mostly due to the Clodomiro Picado Research Institute, responsible for the production of antivenom. In the Colombian states of Antioquia and Chocó, it causes 50–70% of all snakebites, with a sequelae rate of 6% and a fatality rate of 5% (Otero et al., 1992). In the state of Lara, Venezuela, it is responsible for 78% of all envenomations and all snakebite fatalities. One of the reasons so many people are bitten is its association with human habitation, and many bites occur indoors.

=== King cobra ===
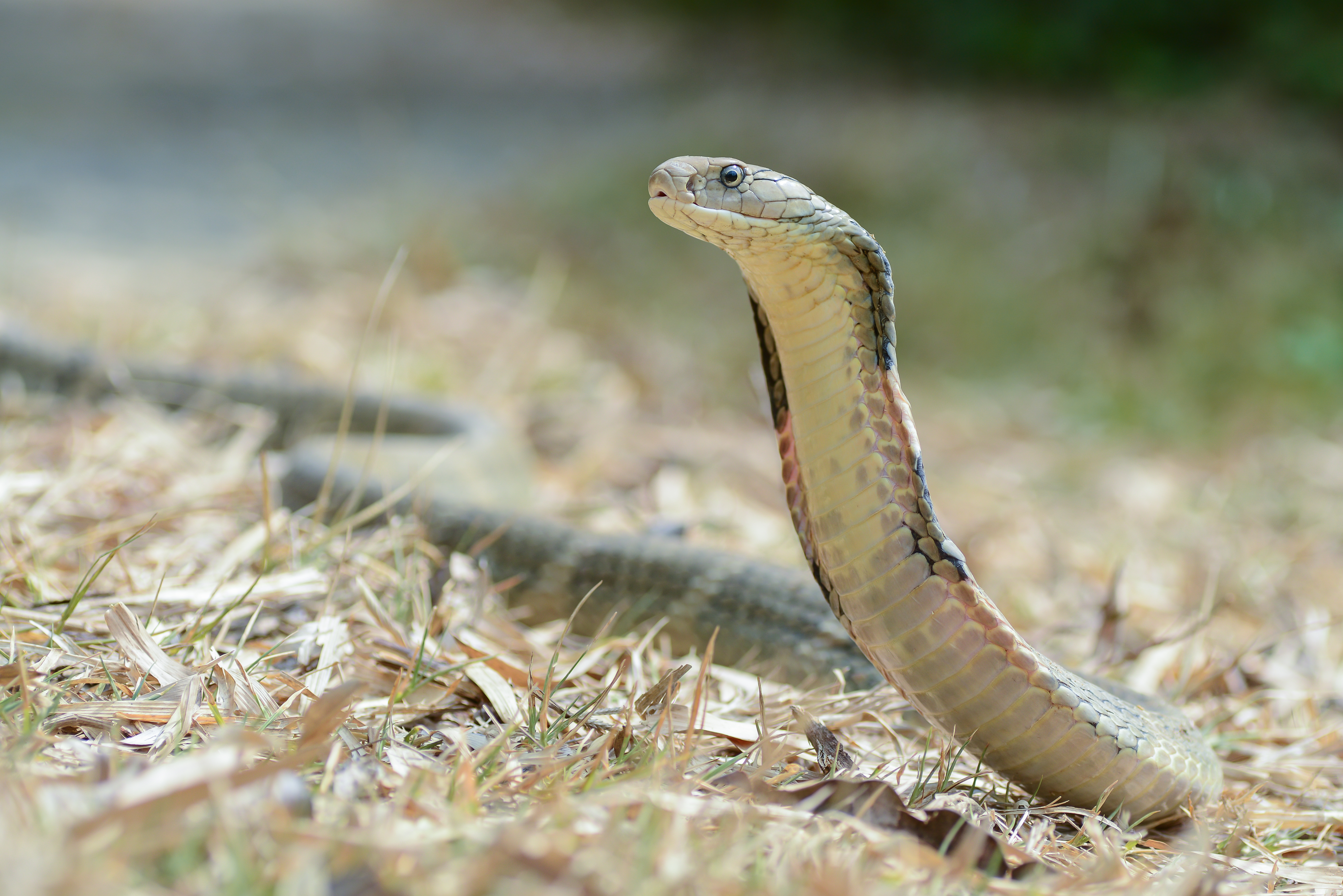
King cobra (Ophiophagus hannah), Kaeng Krachan National Park

The king cobra (Ophiophagus hannah) is the longest venomous snake in the world, and it can inject very high volumes of venom in a single bite. The venom LD_{50} is 1.80 mg/kg SC according to Broad et al. (1979). The mean value of subcutaneous LD_{50} of five wild-caught king cobras in Southeast Asia was determined to be 1.93 mg/kg. Between 350 and 500 mg (dry weight) of venom can be injected at once (Minton, 1974). In another study by Broad et al. (1979), the average venom quantity was 421 mg (dry weight of milked venom). The maximum venom yield is approximately 1000 mg (dry weight).

The king cobra has a fearsome reputation. When annoyed, it spreads a narrow hood and growls loudly, but some scientists claim that their aggressiveness is grossly exaggerated. In most of the local encounters with live, wild king cobras, the snakes appear to be of rather placid disposition, and they usually end up being killed or subdued with hardly any histrionics. These support the view that wild king cobras generally have a mild temperament, and despite their frequent occurrence in disturbed and built-up areas, are adept at avoiding humans. Naturalist Michael Wilmer Forbes Tweedie felt that "this notion is based on the general tendency to dramatise all attributes of snakes with little regard for the truth about them. A moment's reflection shows that this must be so, for the species is not uncommon, even in populated areas, and consciously or unconsciously, people must encounter king cobras quite frequently. If the snake were really habitually aggressive records of its bite would be frequent; as it is they are extremely rare." Mortality rates vary sharply depending on many factors. In cases where envenomation is severe, death can be rapid.

=== Many-banded krait ===
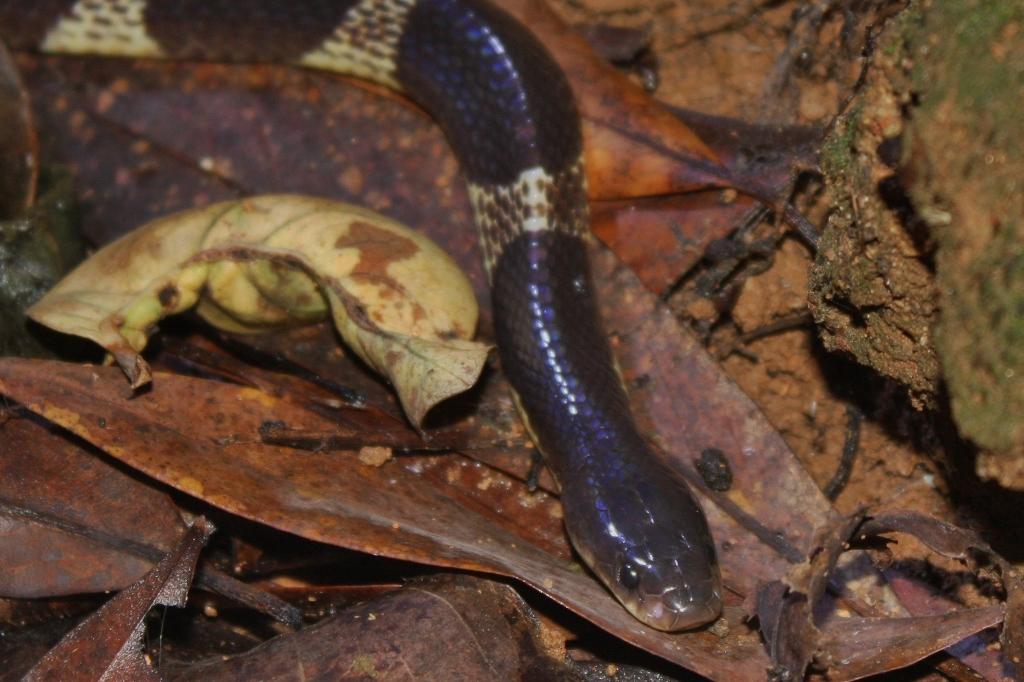
Many-banded krait (Bungarus multicinctus)

The many-banded krait (Bungarus multicinctus) is the second most venomous krait species known, based on toxinological studies conducted on mice. The venom of the many-banded krait consists of both pre- and postsynaptic neurotoxins (known as α-bungarotoxins and β-bungarotoxins, among others). Due to poor response to antivenom therapy, mortality rates are very high in cases of envenomation – up to 50% of cases that receive antivenom are still fatal. Case fatality rates of the many-banded krait envenoming reach 77–100% without treatment. The average venom yield from specimens kept on snake farms was between 4.6 and 18.4 mg per bite. In another study, the average venom yield was 11 mg (Sawai, 1976).

The venom is possibly the most toxic of any Bungarus (krait) species and possibly the most toxic of any snake species in Asia, with LD_{50} values of 0.09 mg/kg–0.108 mg/kg SC, 0.113 mg/kg IV and 0.08 mg/kg IP on mice. Based on several LD_{50} studies, the many-banded krait is among the most venomous land snakes in the world. The Taiwan National Poison Control Center reports that the chief cause of death from snakebite during the decade (2002–2012) was respiratory failure, with 80% of these caused by bites from the many-banded krait.

=== Malayan krait ===
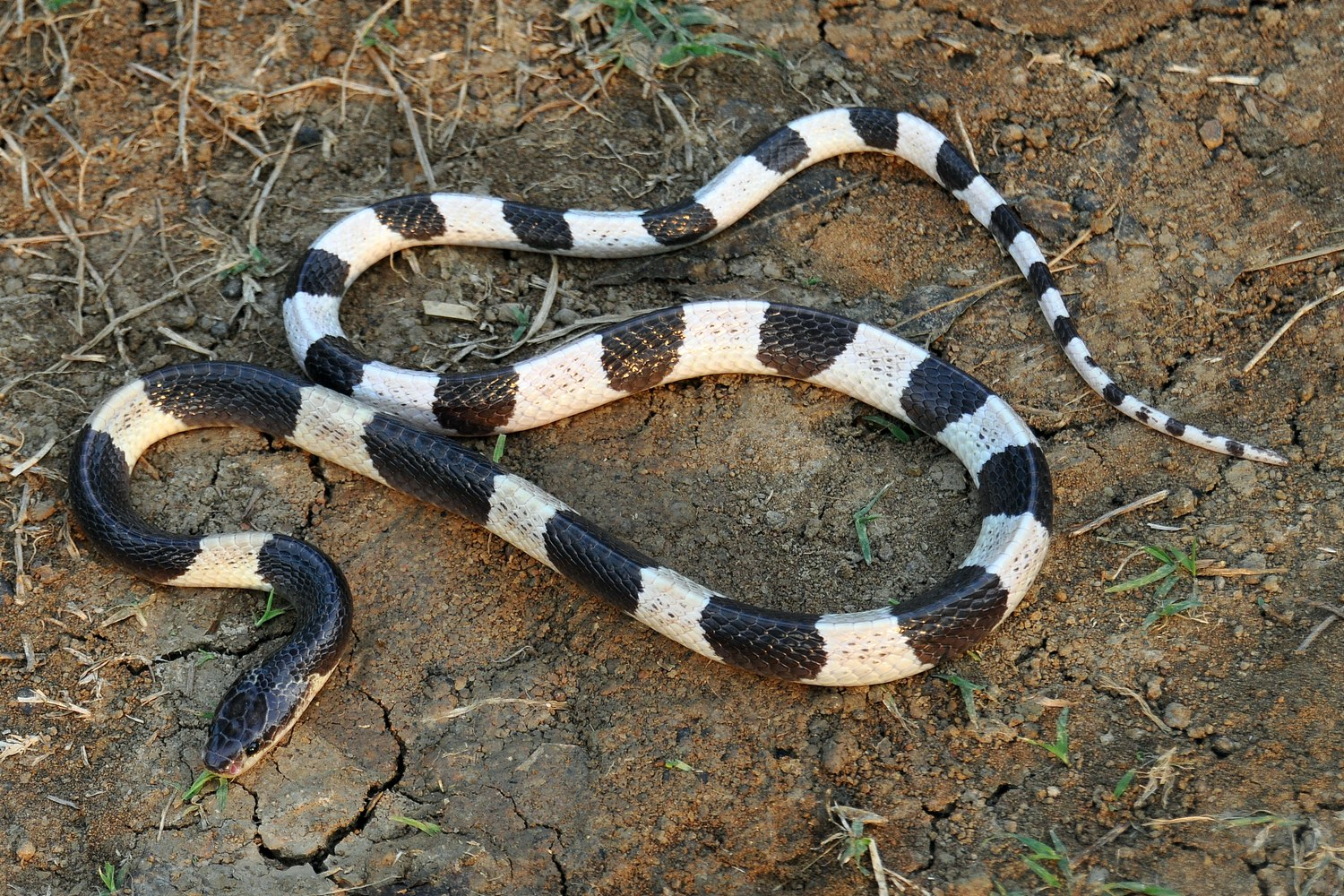
Malayan krait (Bungarus candidus)

The Malayan krait (Bungarus candidus) is another dangerously venomous species of krait. In mice, the IV LD_{50} for this species is 0.1 mg/kg. Envenomation rate among this species is very high and the untreated mortality is 70%, although even with antivenom and mechanical ventilation the mortality rate is at 50%.

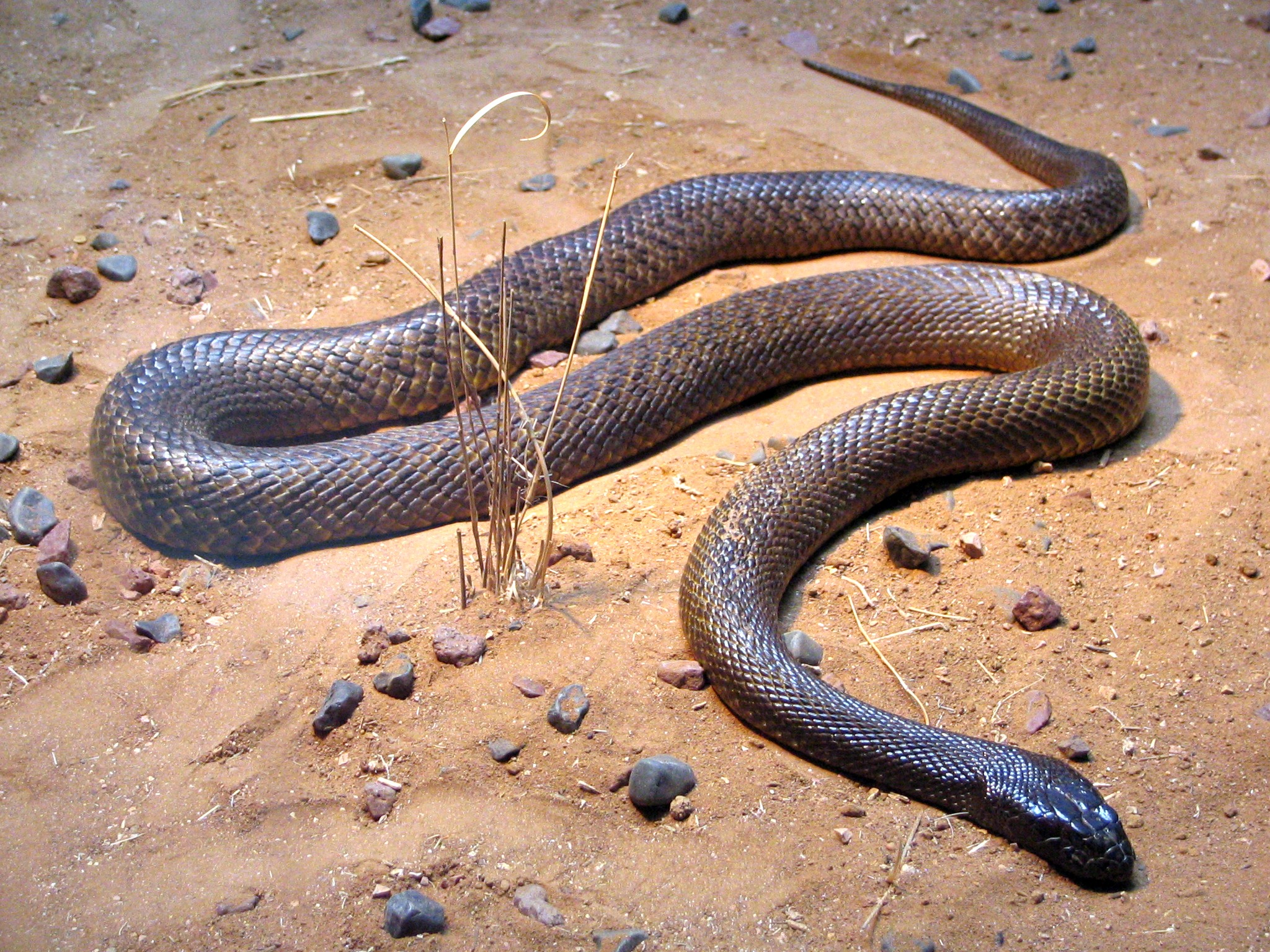
Inland taipan (Oxyuranus microlepidotus)

=== Inland taipan ===
The inland taipan (Oxyuranus microlepidotus) is considered the most venomous snake in the world with a murine LD_{50} value of 0.025 mg/kg SC. Ernst and Zug et al. 1996 list a value of 0.01 mg/kg SC, which makes it the most venomous snake in the world in their study too. They have an average venom yield of 44 mg. Bites from this species have a mortality rate of 80% if left untreated, although it is very rare for this species to bite. This species is known to be a very shy, reclusive and a laid-back snake that will nearly always slither away from disturbance. It is not an aggressive species and rarely strikes. No recorded incidents have been fatal since the advent of the monovalent (specific) antivenom therapy.

=== Eastern brown snake ===
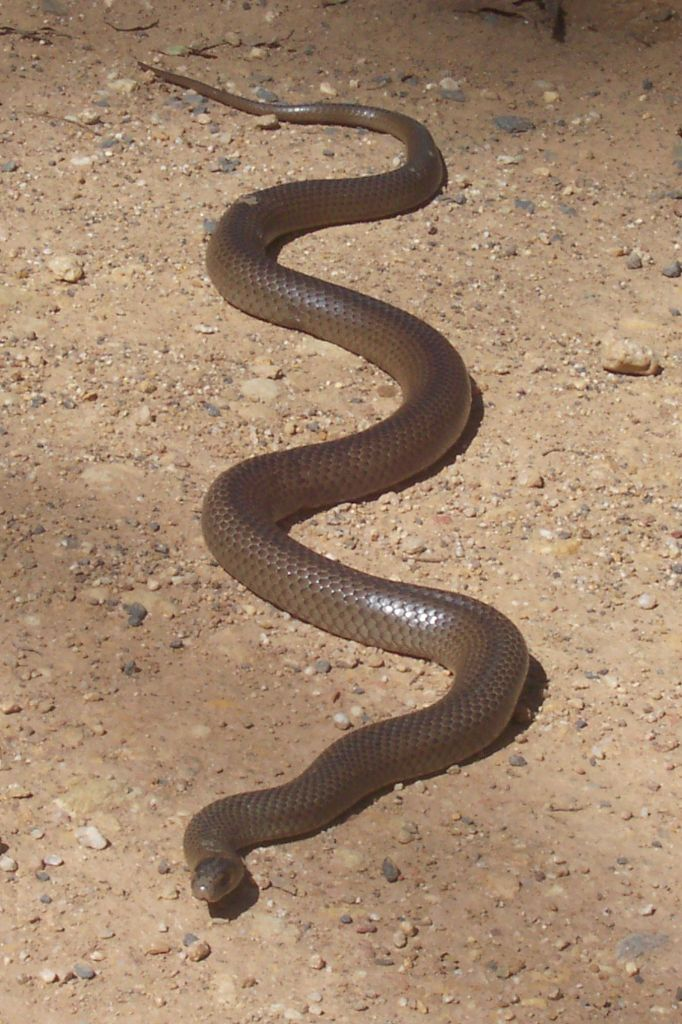
Eastern brown snake (Pseudonaja textilis)

The eastern brown snake (Pseudonaja textilis) has a venom LD_{50} value of 0.053 mg SC (Brown, 1973) and a value of 0.0365 mg SC (Ernst and Zug et al. 1996). Average venom yield is 2–6 mg (Meier and White, 1995). Average venom yield (dry weight) is between 5–10 mg (Minton, 1974). Maximum venom yield for this species is 155 mg. This species is legendary for its bad temper, aggression, and for its speed. This species is responsible for more deaths every year in Australia than any other group of snakes. Australia reports on average well under 10 snake bite deaths per year due to high levels of snake awareness and education, quality medical facilities and personnel and the availability of anti venom.

=== Common death adder ===
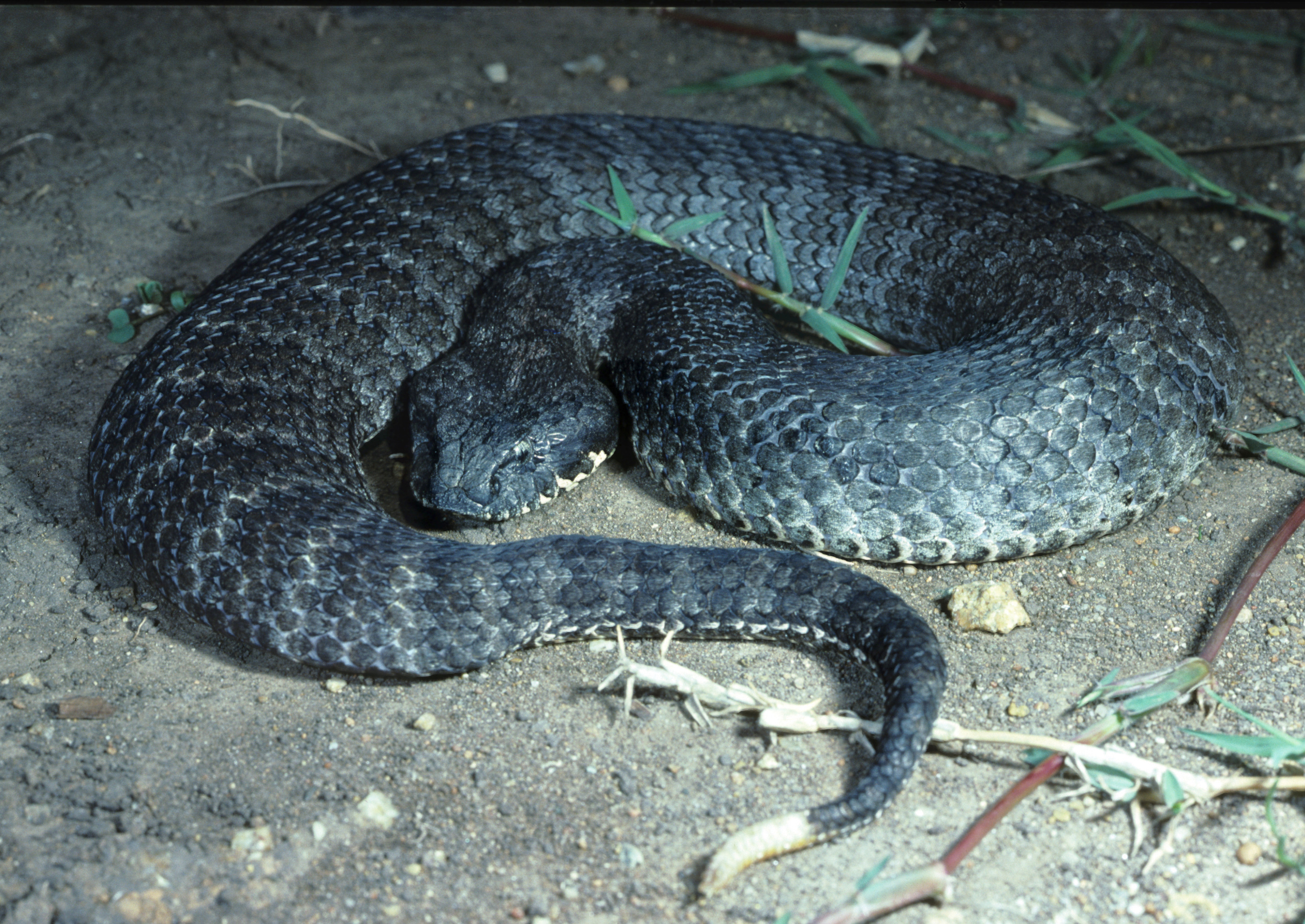
Common death adder (Acanthophis antarcticus)

The common death adder (Acanthophis antarcticus) is a highly venomous snake species with a 50–60% untreated mortality rate. It is also the fastest striking venomous snake in the world. A death adder can go from a strike position, to strike and envenoming their prey, and back to strike position again, in less than 0.15 seconds. The SC LD_{50} value is 0.4 mg/kg and the venom yield per bite can range anywhere from 70–236 mg. Unlike other snakes that flee from approaching humans crashing through the undergrowth, common death adders are more likely to sit tight and risk being stepped on, making them more dangerous to the unwary bushwalker. They are said to be reluctant to bite unless actually touched.

=== Tiger snake ===
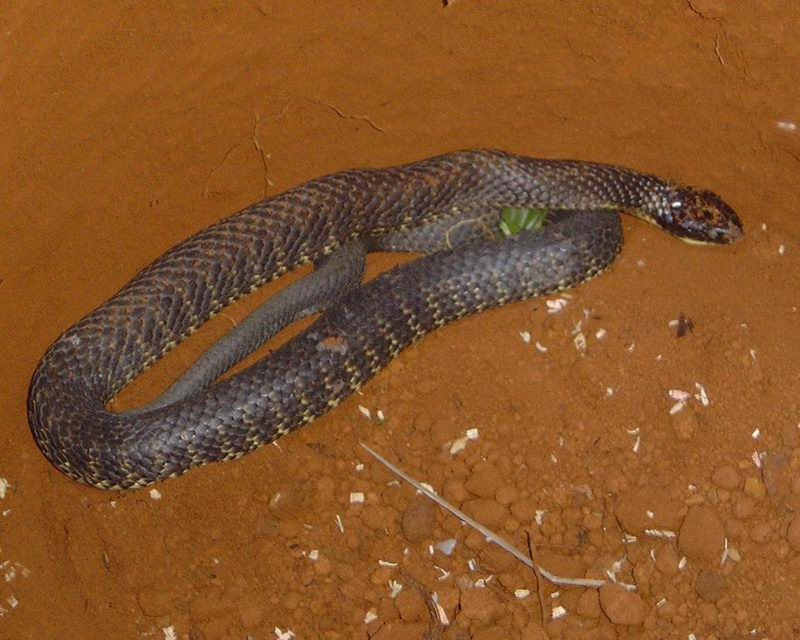
Tiger snake (Notechis spp.)

The tiger snake (Notechis scutatus) is highly venomous. Its venom possesses potent neurotoxins, coagulants, haemolysins and myotoxins and the venom is quick-acting with rapid onset of breathing difficulties and paralysis. The untreated mortality rate from tiger snake bites is reported to be between 40 and 60%. It is a major cause of snakebites and occasional snakebite deaths in Australia.

The African tiger snake (Telescopus semiannulatus), 60–70 cm long, on the other hand, is rear-fanged and only mildly venomous and not dangerous to humans.

=== Green mambas ===
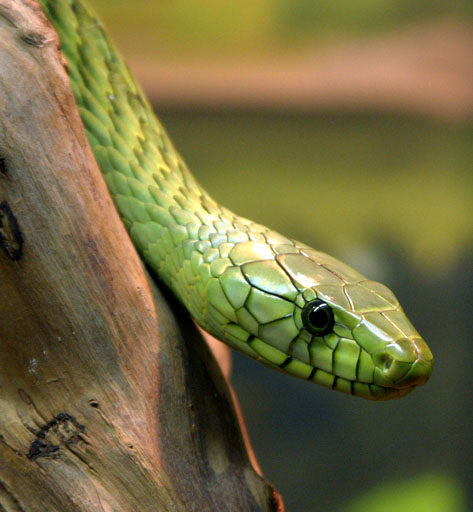
Western green mamba (Dendroaspis viridis)

Green mambas (western, eastern, and Jameson's) are all highly venomous snakes that can be highly aggressive and unpredictable in disposition. They can suddenly go from a state of relative calm to an extremely agitated and dangerous state. All three species have a tendency to strike repeatedly with little provocation, although they are generally much less aggressive than their larger cousin, the black mamba. All three species of green mamba are highly arboreal, alert, extremely quick, and agile. Although the potency of their venom is similar to the more venomous cobra species, mamba venom is much more rapid-acting and the dendrotoxins contained in mamba venom is generally more devastating in nature to the central nervous system, causing more severe neurotoxicity in more rapid fashion.

The western green mamba (Dendroaspis viridis) is highly venomous and aggressive with a LD_{50} of 0.7 mg/kg SC and the average venom yield per bite is approximately 100 mg. The mortality rate of untreated bites is unknown but is thought to be very high (>80%).

The eastern green mamba (Dendroaspis angusticeps) has an average venom yield per bite of 80 mg according to Engelmann and Obst (1981). The subcutaneous LD_{50} for this species ranges from 0.40 mg/kg to 3.05 mg/kg depending on different toxicology studies, authority figures and estimates. The mortality rate of untreated bites is unknown but is thought to be very high (70–75%). Generally the calmest and most shy of the green mamba species, the Eastern green will still strike repeatedly if cornered or agitated.

Jameson's mamba (Dendroaspis jamesoni) is known to be quite aggressive and defensive. The average venom yield per bite for this species is 80 mg, but some specimens may yield as much as 120 mg in a single bite. The SC LD_{50} for this species according to Brown (1973) is 1.0 mg/kg, while the IV LD_{50} is 0.8 mg/kg. Envenomation by Jameson's mamba can be deadly in as little as 30 to 120 minutes after being bitten, if proper medical treatment is not attained. The mortality rate of untreated bites is not exactly known, but it's said to be very high (>80%).

=== True cobras ===
The cobras (Naja spp.) are a medically important group of snakes due to the number of bites and fatalities they cause across their geographical range. The genus Naja consists of 20 to 22 species, but has undergone several taxonomic revisions in recent years, so sources vary greatly. They range throughout Africa (including some parts of the Sahara where Naja haje can be found), Southwest Asia, Central Asia, South Asia, East Asia, and Southeast Asia. The most recent revision, listed 28 species after the synonymisation of Boulengerina and Paranaja with Naja. But unlike some other members of the family Elapidae (the species of the genus Bungarus, genus Oxyuranus, genus Pseudohaje, and especially genus Dendroaspis), half of the bites by many species of both African and Asian origin of the genus Naja are "dry bites" (a dry bite is a bite by a venomous snake in which no venom is released). Roughly 45–50% of bites by most cobra species are dry bites and thus don't cause envenomation.

Some of the species that are known and documented to deliver dry bites in a majority of cases include Naja naja, Naja kaouthia, Naja sputatrix, Naja siamensis, Naja haje, Naja annulifera, Naja anchietae, and Naja nigricollis. Some species will inject venom in the majority of their bites, but still deliver high number of dry bites (40–45%) include: Naja sumatrana, Naja melanoleuca, Naja atra, Naja mossambica and Naja katiensis. Within this genus, there are a few species in which dry bites are very rare. Envenoming occurs in at least 75–80% of bite cases involving these species. The species that typically cause envenomation in the majority of their bites include some of the more dangerous and venomous species of this genus: Naja oxiana, Naja philippinensis, Naja nivea, and Naja samarensis. There are many more species within the genus that have not yet been subject to much research and studies, and as a result, very little is known about their behaviour, venom, diet, habitat, and general temperaments. Some of these species include Naja sagittifera, Naja annulata, Naja christyi, and many others.

==== Caspian cobra ====
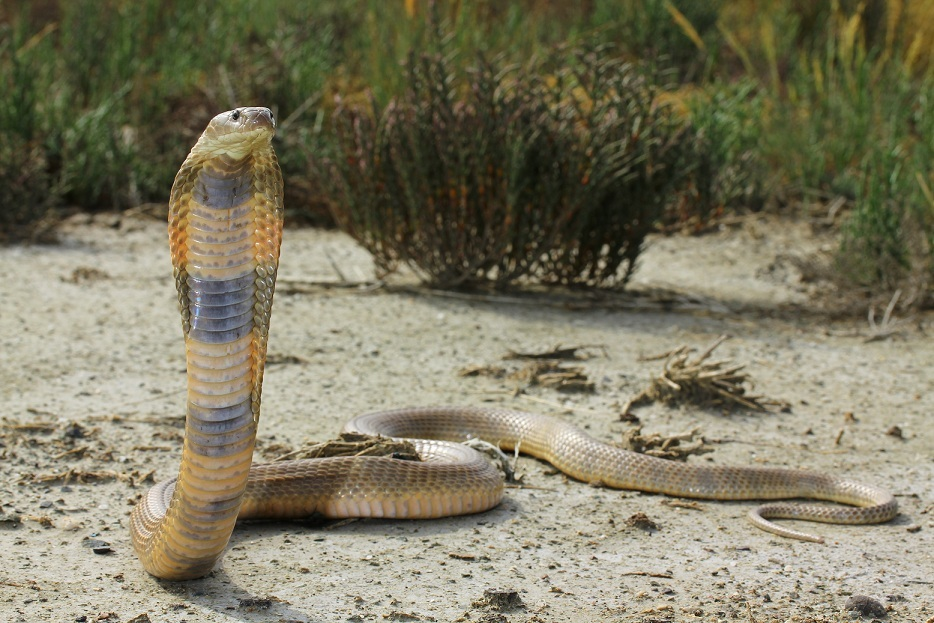
Caspian cobra (Naja oxiana)

The most medically important species of snake bites in Central Asia is the Caspian cobra (Naja oxiana). It is the most venomous species of cobra in the world, slightly ahead of the Philippine cobra based on a toxinological study from 1992 found in the Indian Journal of Experimental Biology, in which this species produced the highest potency venom among cobras. The venom of this species has the most potent composition of toxins found among any cobra species known. It is made up of primarily highly potent neurotoxins but it also has cytotoxic activity (tissue-death, necrosis) and cardiotoxins. Two forms of "cytotoxin II" (cardiotoxin) were found in the venom of this species. The crude venom of this species produced the lowest known lethal dose (LCLo) of 0.005 mg/kg, the lowest among all cobra species, derived from an individual case of poisoning by intracerebroventricular injection. According to Brown (1973), the subcutaneous LD_{99–100} value is 0.4 mg/kg, while Ernst and Zug et al. list a value of 0.21 mg/kg SC and 0.037 mg/kg IV. Latifi (1984) listed a subcutaneous value of 0.2 mg/kg (0.09–0.26 mg/kg). In another study, where venom was collected from a number of specimens in Iran, the Subcutis LD_{50} in lab mice was 0.078 mg/kg. Average venom yield per bite for this species is between 75 and 125 mg (dry weight), but it may yield up to 590 mg (dry weight) in a single bite.

The bite of this species may cause severe pain and swelling, along with severe neurotoxicity. Weakness, drowsiness, ataxia, hypotension, and paralysis of throat and limbs may appear in less than one hour after the bite. Without medical treatment, symptoms rapidly worsen and death can occur rapidly after a bite due to respiratory failure. An adult woman bitten by this species in northwestern Pakistan suffered severe neurotoxicity and died while en route to the closest hospital nearly 50 minutes after envenomation. Between 1979 and 1987, 136 confirmed bites were attributed to this species in the former Soviet Union. Of the 136, 121 received antivenom, and only four died. Of the 15 who did not receive antivenom, 11 died. This species is an abundant snake in northeastern Iran and is responsible for a very large number of snakebite mortalities. Antivenom is not as effective for envenomation by this species as it is for other Asiatic cobras within the same region, like the Indian cobra (Naja naja) and due to the dangerous toxicity of this species' venom, massive amounts of antivenom are often required for patients. As a result, a monovalent antivenom serum is being developed by the Razi Vaccine and Serum Research Institute in Iran. The untreated mortality rate for this species is 70–75%, which is the highest among all cobra species of the genus Naja.

==== Forest cobra ====
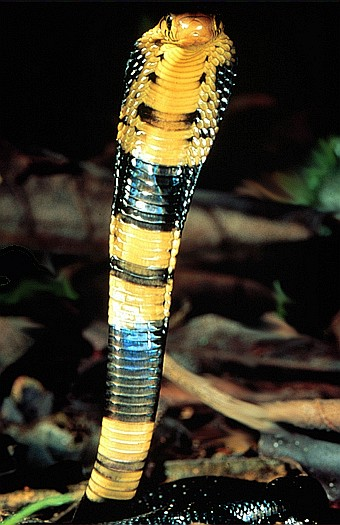
Forest cobra (Naja melanoleuca), Kakamega Forest, Kenya

The forest cobra (Naja melanoleuca) is the largest true cobra of the genus Naja and is a bad-tempered and irritable snake when cornered or molested as handled in captivity. According to Brown (1973) this species has a murine IP LD_{50} value of 0.324 mg/kg, while the IV LD_{50} value is 0.6 mg/kg. Ernst and Zug et al. 1996 list a value of 0.225 mg/kg SC. The venom yield per bite ranges drastically among sources: a maximal dose of 500 mg has been recorded while another venom yield project on two individuals obtained an average dose of 571 mg (dry venom) with a maximum of 1102 mg from 59 times of milking. The forest cobra is one of the least frequent causes of snake bite among the African cobras. This is largely due to its forest-dwelling habits. It is the largest of the Naja cobras and the venom is considered highly toxic. If the snake becomes cornered or is agitated, it can quickly attack the aggressor, and if a large amount of venom is injected, a rapidly fatal outcome is possible. Clinical experience with forest cobras has been very sparse, and few recorded bites have been documented. However, in 2008, around the area of Friguiagbé in Guinea, there were 375 bites attributed to the forest cobra and of those 79 were fatal. Most of the fatal bites were patients who received no medical treatment. Deaths from respiratory failure have been reported, but most victims will survive if prompt administration of antivenom is undertaken as soon as clinical signs of envenomation have been noted.

==== Philippine cobra ====
Philippine cobra (naja philippinensis)

The Philippine cobra (Naja philippinensis) is one of the most venomous cobra species in the world based on murine LD_{50} studies. The average subcutaneous LD_{50} for this species is 0.20 mg/kg. The lowest LD_{50} reported value for this snake is 0.14 mg/kg SC, while the highest is 0.48 mg/kg SC. and the average venom yield per bite is 90–100 mg. The venom of the Philippine cobra is a potent postsynaptic neurotoxin which affects respiratory function and can cause neurotoxicity and respiratory paralysis, as the neurotoxins interrupt the transmission of nerve signals by binding to the neuromuscular junctions near the muscles. Research has shown its venom is purely a neurotoxin, with no apparent necrotizing components and no cardiotoxins. These snakes are capable of accurately spitting their venom at a target up to 3 metres (9.8 ft) away. Bites from this species produce prominent neurotoxicity and are considered especially dangerous. A study of 39 patients envenomed by the Philippine cobra was conducted in 1988. Neurotoxicity occurred in 38 cases and was the predominant clinical feature. Complete respiratory failure developed in 19 patients, and was often rapid in onset; in three cases, apnea occurred within just 30 minutes of the bite. There were two deaths, both in patients who were moribund upon arrival at the hospital. Three patients developed necrosis, and 14 individuals with systemic symptoms had no local swelling at all. Both cardiotoxicity and reliable nonspecific signs of envenoming were absent. Bites by the Philippine cobra produce a distinctive clinical picture characterized by severe neurotoxicity of rapid onset and minimal local tissue damage.

==== Cape cobra ====
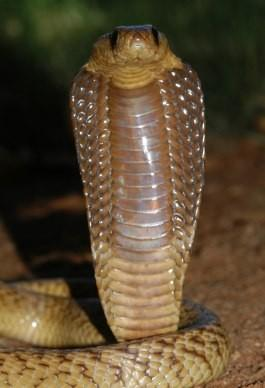
Cape cobra (Naja nivea)

The Cape cobra (Naja nivea) is regarded as one of the most dangerous species of cobra in Africa, by virtue of its potent venom and frequent occurrence around houses. The venom of this snake tends to be thick and syrupy in consistency and dries into shiny pale flakes, not unlike yellow sugar. The Cape cobras venom is made up of potent postsynaptic neurotoxins and might also contain cardiotoxins, that affect the respiratory system, nervous system, and the heart. The mouse SC LD_{50} for this species' venom is 0.72, while the IV and IP LD_{50} values are 0.4 mg/kg and 0.6 mg/kg, respectively.

The average venom yield per bite is 100 to 150 mg according to Minton. The mortality rate for untreated bites is not exactly known, but is thought to be high. This can be because of various factors including the amount of venom injected, psychological state of the bitten subject and the penetration of one or both fangs. Mechanical ventilation and symptom management is often enough to save a victim's life, but cases of serious Cape cobra envenomation will require antivenom. When death does occur, it normally takes anywhere from an hour (in severe cases) to ten hours (or more) and it is often as a result of respiratory failure, because of the onset of paralysis. The antivenom used in case of a bite is a polyvalent antivenom produced by the South African Institute of Medical Research (SAIMR).

=== Jararaca ===
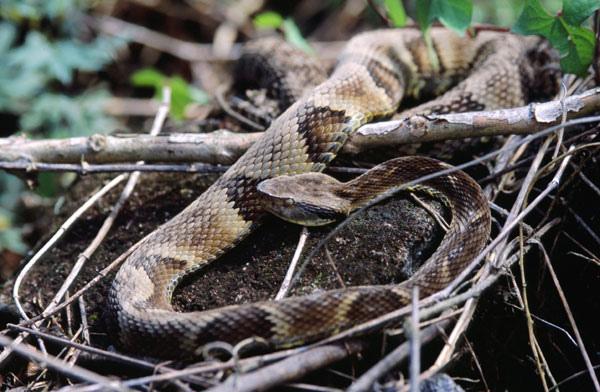
Jararaca (Bothrops jararaca)

The jararaca (Bothrops jararaca) is a species that is often abundant within its range, where it is an important cause of snakebite. It is the best-known venomous snake in the wealthy and heavily populated areas of southeastern Brazil, where it was responsible for 52% (3,446 cases) of snakebites between 1902 and 1945, with a 0.7% mortality rate (25 deaths). The average venom yield is 25–26 milligrams (0.39–0.40 gr) with a maximum of 300 milligrams (4.6 gr) of dried venom. The venom is slightly more toxic than that of the terciopelo or fer-de-lance (B. asper). In mice, the median lethal dose (LD_{50}) is 1.2–1.3 mg/kg IV, 1.4 mg/kg IP and 3.0 mg/kg SC. The lethal dose for a 60 kg adult human is 70 mg.

=== South American bushmaster ===
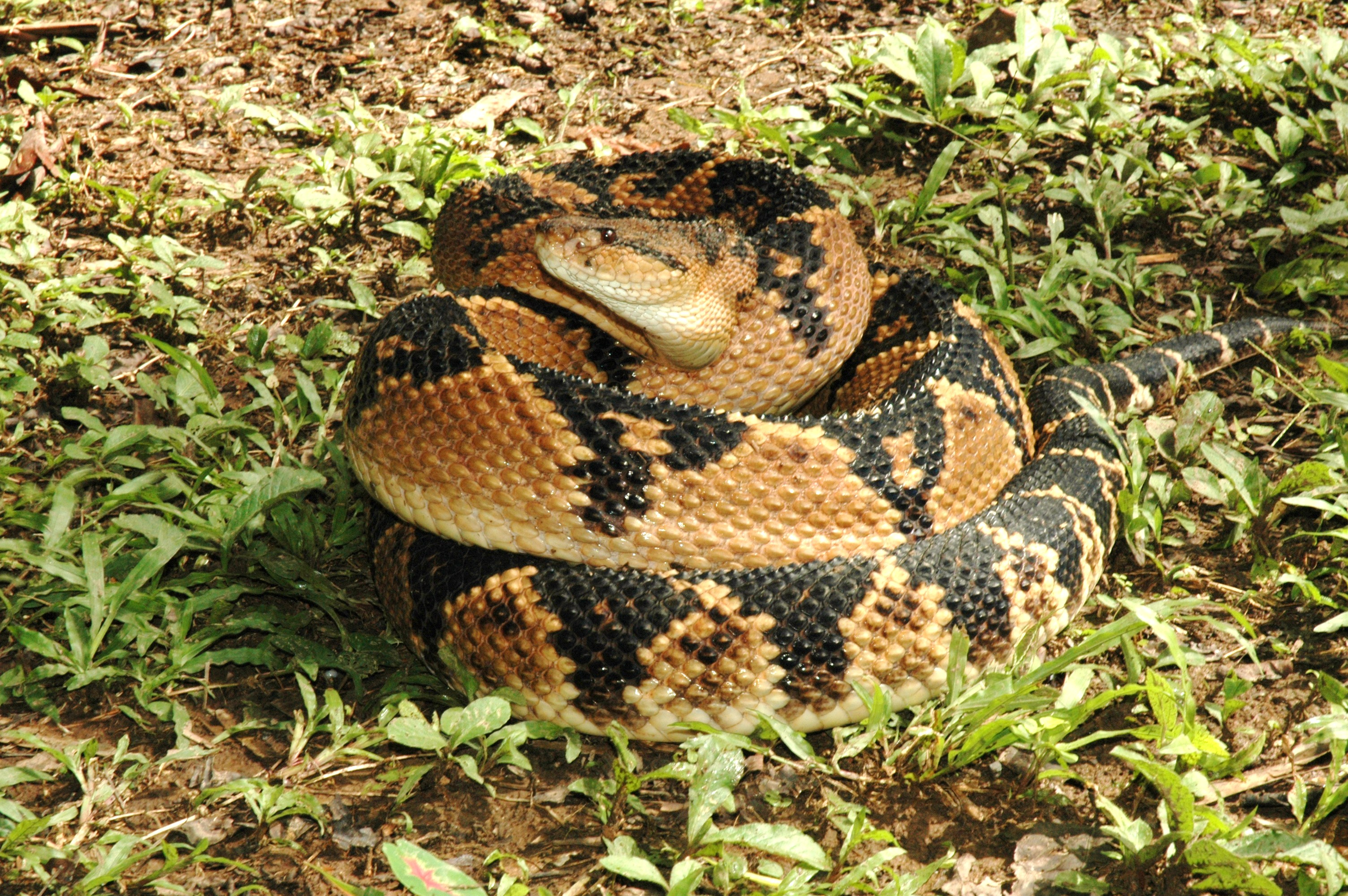
South American bushmaster (Lachesis muta muta)

The South American bushmaster (Lachesis muta muta) is the longest species of venomous snake in the Western Hemisphere and the longest pit viper in the world. It is native to parts of South America, especially the equatorial forests east of the Andes. They are active at dusk or after dark and they are very secretive and elusive. This species is large, fast and has a reputation for being particularly aggressive when cornered. Some reports suggest that this species produces a large amount of venom that is weak compared to some other vipers. Others, however, suggest that such conclusions may not be accurate. These animals are badly affected by stress and rarely live long in captivity. This makes it difficult to obtain venom in useful quantities and good condition for study purposes. For example, Bolaños (1972) observed that venom yield from his specimens fell from 233 mg to 64 mg while they remained in his care. As the stress of being milked regularly has this effect on venom yield, it is reasoned that it may also affect venom toxicity. This may explain the disparity described by Hardy and Haad (1998) between the low laboratory toxicity of the venom and the high mortality rate of bite victims. However, wild specimens have an average venom yield per bite of 280–450 mg (dry weight) (U.S. Dept. Navy, 1968). According to (Sanchez et al., 1992), who used wild specimens from Pará, Brazil, the average venom yield per bite was 324 mg, with a range of 168–552 mg (dry weight). Brown (1973) gives the following LD_{50} values for mice: 1.5 mg/kg IV, 1.6–6.2 mg/kg IP, 6.0 mg/kg SC. He also notes a venom yield of 200–411 mg. Human envenoming by this species, although infrequent, can be rather severe due to the large volumes of venom injected. Envenomation is characterized by pronounced local tissue damage and systemic dysfunctions, including massive internal bleeding.

=== Gaboon viper ===
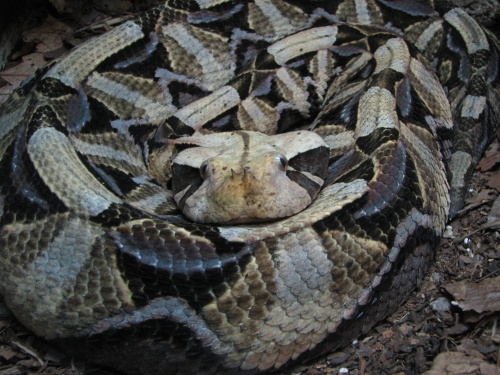
Gaboon viper (Bitis gabonica)

The Gaboon viper (Bitis gabonica), although generally docile and sluggish, has the longest fangs of any venomous snake. Their venom glands are enormous; each bite produces the largest quantities of venom of any venomous snake. Yield is probably related to body weight, as opposed to milking interval. Brown (1973) gives a venom yield range of 200–1000 mg (of dried venom), A range of 200–600 mg for specimens 125–155 cm in length has also been reported. Spawls and Branch (1995) state from 5 to 7 ml (450–600 mg) of venom may be injected in a single bite. Based on how sensitive monkeys were to the venom, Whaler (1971) estimated 14 mg of venom would be enough to kill a human being: equivalent to 0.06 ml of venom, or 1/50 to 1/1000 of what can be obtained in a single milking. Marsh and Whaler (1984) wrote that 35 mg (1/30 of the average venom yield) would be enough to kill a man of 70 kilograms (150 lb).

A study by Marsh and Whaler (1984) reported a maximum yield of 9.7 ml of wet venom, which translated to 2400 mg of dried venom. They attached "alligator" clip electrodes to the angle of the open jaw of anesthetized specimens (length 133–136 cm, girth 23–25 cm, weight 1.3–3.4 kg), yielding 1.3–7.6 ml (mean 4.4 ml) of venom. Two to three electrical bursts within a space of five seconds apart were enough to empty the venom glands. The snakes used for the study were milked seven to 11 times over a 12-month period, during which they remained in good health and the potency of their venom remained the same. In addition, Gaboon vipers produce the most painful bite of any venomous snake in the world. A bite causes very rapid and conspicuous swelling, intense pain, severe shock and local blistering. Other symptoms may include uncoordinated movements, defecation, urination, swelling of the tongue and eyelids, convulsions and unconsciousness. Blistering, bruising and necrosis is often very extensive. There may be sudden hypotension, heart damage and dyspnoea. The blood may become incoagulable with internal bleeding that may lead to haematuria and haematemesis. Local tissue damage may require surgical excision and possibly amputation. Healing may be slow and fatalities during the recovery period are not uncommon.

=== Chinese cobra ===
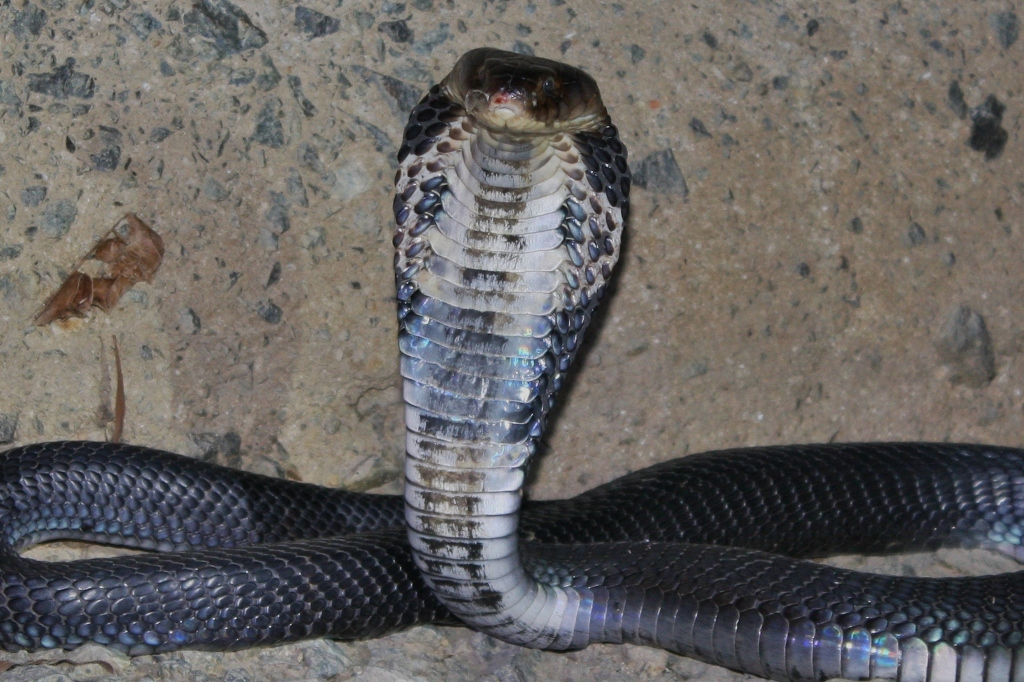
Chinese cobra (Naja atra)

The Chinese cobra (Naja atra) is a highly venomous member of the true cobras (genus Naja). Its venom consists mainly of postsynaptic neurotoxins and cardiotoxins. Four cardiotoxin-analogues I, II, III, and IV, account for about 54% of the dry weight of the crude venom and have cytotoxic properties. The LD_{50} values of its venom in mice are 0.29 mg/kg IV, and 0.29 – 0.53 mg/kg SC. The average venom yield from a snake of this species kept at a snake farm was about 250.8 mg (80 mg dry weight). According to Minton (1974), this cobra has a venom yield range of 150 to 200 mg (dry weight). Brown listed a venom yield of 184 mg (dry weight). It is one of the most prevalent venomous snakes in mainland China and Taiwan, which has caused many snakebite incidents to humans.

=== Monocled cobra ===
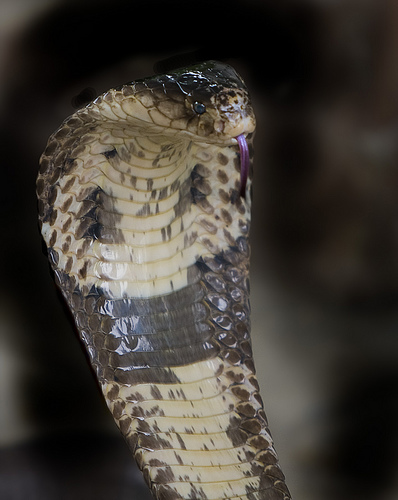
Monocled cobra (Naja kaouthia)

The monocled cobra (Naja kaouthia) is a medically important species as it is responsible for a considerable number of bites throughout its range. The major toxic components in the Monocled cobras venom are postsynaptic neurotoxins, which block the nerve transmission by binding specifically to the nicotinic acetylcholine receptor, leading to flaccid paralysis and even death by respiratory failure. The major α-neurotoxin in Naja kaouthia venom is a long neurotoxin, α-cobratoxin; the minor α-neurotoxin is different from cobrotoxin in one residue. The neurotoxins of this particular species are weak. The venom of this species also contains myotoxins and cardiotoxins. The median lethal dose (LD_{50}) is 0.28–0.33 mg per gram of mouse body weight. In case of IV the LD_{50} is 0.373 mg/kg, and 0.225 mg/kg in case of IP. The average venom yield per bite is approximately 263 mg (dry weight). The monocled cobra causes the highest fatality due to snake venom poisoning in Thailand.

Envenomation usually presents predominantly with extensive local necrosis and systemic manifestations to a lesser degree. Drowsiness, neurological and neuromuscular symptoms will usually manifest earliest; hypotension, flushing of the face, warm skin, and pain around bite site typically manifest within one to four hours following the bite; paralysis, ventilatory failure or death could ensue rapidly, possibly as early as 60 minutes in very severe cases of envenomation. However, the presence of fang marks does not always imply that envenomation actually occurred.

=== Egyptian cobra ===
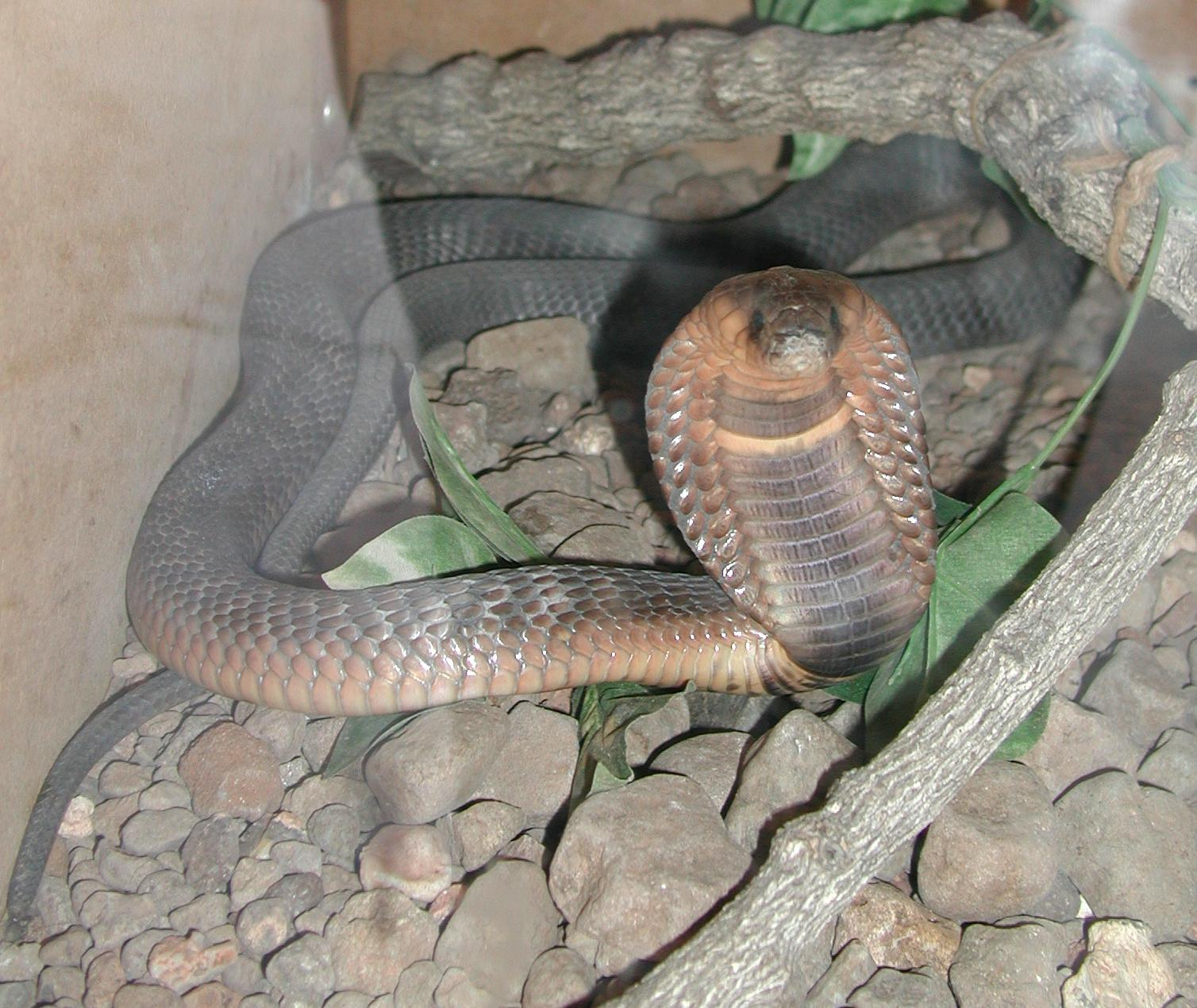
Egyptian cobra (Naja haje)

The Egyptian cobra (Naja haje) is another species of cobra that causes a significant number of bites and human fatalities throughout its range. The venom of the Egyptian cobra consists mainly of neurotoxins and cytotoxins. The average venom yield is 175 to 300 mg in a single bite, and the murine subcutaneous LD_{50} value is 1.15 mg/kg. This species has large fangs and can produce large quantities of venom. Envenomation by this snake is a very serious medical emergency.

=== Water cobras ===
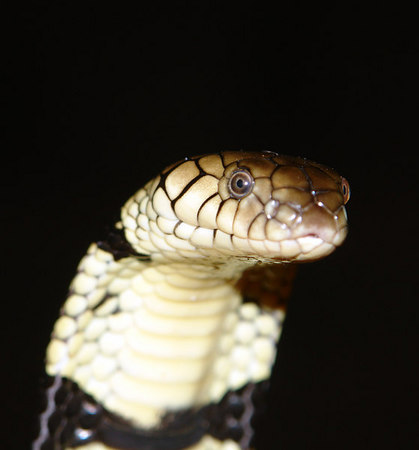
Banded water cobra (Naja annulata)

The water cobras found in central and western Africa are an extremely venomous cobra species (Naja). These species were formerly under the genus Boulengerina. The banded water cobra (Naja annulata) and the Congo water cobra (Naja christyi) are dangerously venomous. The banded water cobra has one subspecies which is known as Storms water cobra (Naja annulata stormsi). Their venoms are extremely potent neurotoxins. A toxicological study listed the intraperitoneal (IP) LD_{50} of N. annulata at 0.143 mg/kg. Brown (1973) listed the intravenous LD_{50} for N. a. annulata at 0.2 mg/kg. The same study listed the intraperitoneal (IP) LD_{50} of N. christyi at 0.12 mg/kg. The venoms of these little-known elapids have the lowest intraperitoneal LD_{50} of any Naja species studied thus far and have high concentrations of potent postsynaptic neurotoxins. Serious and dangerous envenomation can result from a bite from either of these snakes. There is at least one case of human envenomation caused by the Congo water cobra (N. christyi). Symptoms of the envenomation were mild. There is no specific antivenom currently produced for either of these two species.

=== Black cobra ===
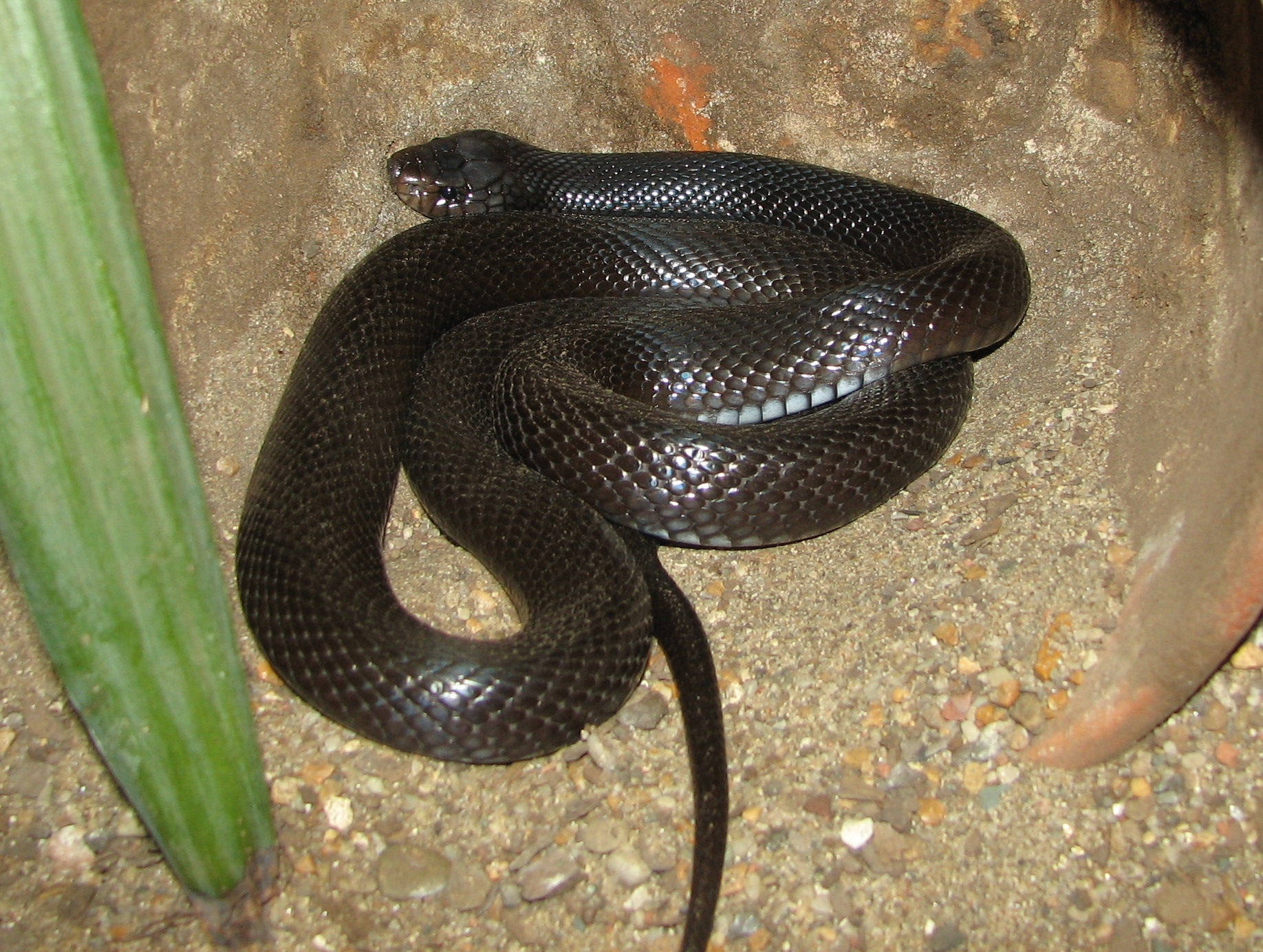
Black desert cobra (Walterinnesia aegyptia)

The black desert cobra (Walterinnesia aegyptia) is a highly venomous snake species found in the Middle East. The subcutaneous LD_{50} for the venom of this species is 0.40 mg/kg. For comparison, the Indian cobra's (naja naja) subcutaneous LD_{50} is 0.80 mg/kg, while the Cape cobra's (naja nivea) subcutaneous LD_{50} is 0.72 mg/kg. This makes the black desert cobra a more venomous species than both. The venom is strongly neurotoxic and also has mild hemotoxic factors. Envenomation usually causes some combination of local pain, swelling, fever, general weakness, headache, & vomiting. This is not a typically aggressive snake, but it will strike and hiss loudly when provoked. It can strike at a distance of two-thirds of its body length. It does not usually spread a hood nor hold up its body up off the ground like true cobras do. Envenomation by this species should be considered a serious medical emergency. Human fatalities due to envenomation by this species have been reported.

=== Spitting cobras ===
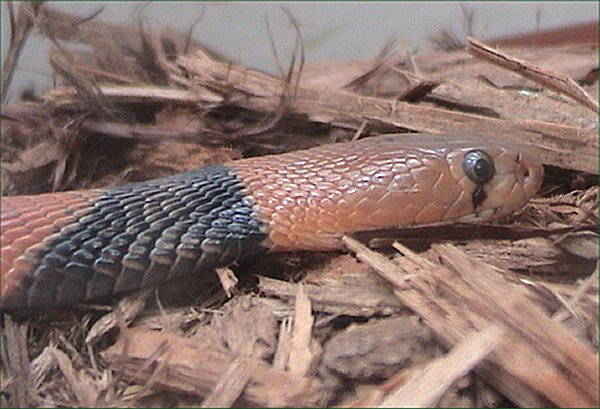
Red spitting cobra (Naja pallida), juvenile

Spitting cobras are another group of cobras that belong to the genus Naja. Spitting cobras can be found in both Africa and Asia. These cobras have the ability to eject venom from their fangs when defending themselves against predators. The sprayed venom is harmless to intact skin. However, it can cause permanent blindness if introduced to the eye and left untreated (causing chemosis and corneal swelling). The venom sprays out in distinctive geometric patterns, using muscular contractions upon the venom glands. These muscles squeeze the glands and force the venom out through forward-facing holes at the tips of the fangs. The explanation that a large gust of air is expelled from the lung to propel the venom forward has been proven wrong. When cornered, some species can "spit" their venom a distance as great as 2 m (6.6 ft). While spitting is typically their primary form of defense, all spitting cobras are capable of delivering venom through a bite as well. Most species' venom exhibit significant hemotoxic effects, along with more typical neurotoxic effects of other cobra species.

=== Samar cobra ===
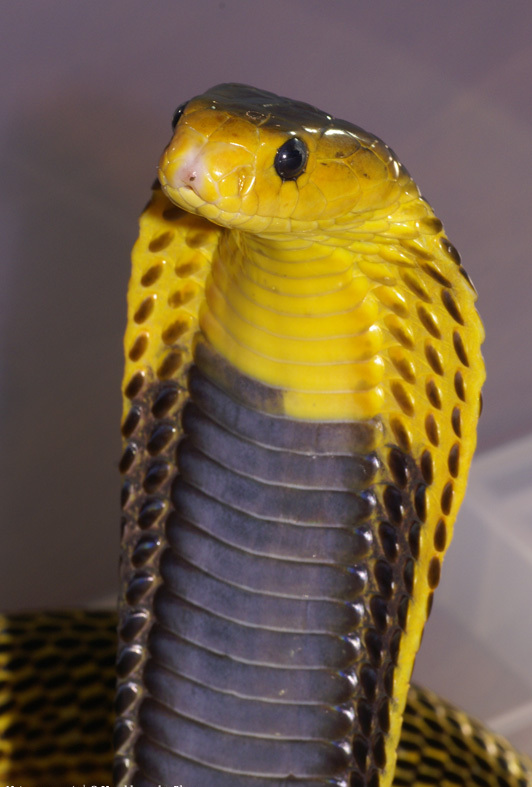
Samar cobra (Naja samarensis)

The Samar cobra (Naja samarensis) is a highly venomous species of spitting cobra that is found in the southern islands of the Philippines. Although it is a spitting cobra, this species only rarely spits its venom. It is considered to be an extremely aggressive snake that strikes with little provocation. The venom of this species is not well studied, but is known to be an extremely potent postsynaptic neurotoxin that also contains cytotoxic agents. According to Ernst & Zug et al. the murine SC LD_{50} value is 0.21 mg/kg, making it one of the most venomous true cobra species (genus Naja) in the world. Severe envenomation is likely in case of a bite and envenomation rate is high. The untreated mortality rate is not known, but is thought to be high (~60%). Envenomation results in marked local effects such as pain, severe swelling, bruising, blistering, and necrosis. Other effects include headache, nausea, vomiting, abdominal pain, diarrhea, dizziness, collapse or convulsions. There may also be moderate to severe flaccid paralysis and kidney damage. Cardiotoxicity is possible, but rare.

=== Indochinese spitting cobra ===
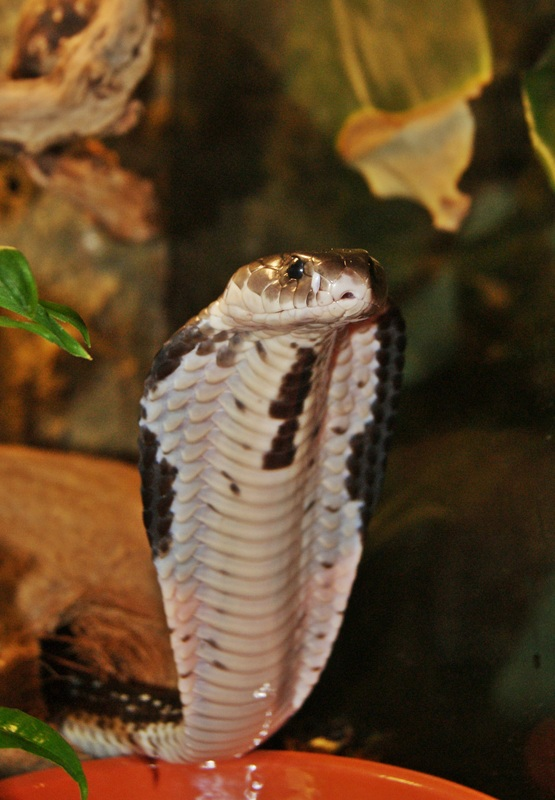
Indochinese spitting cobra (Naja siamensis)

The Indochinese spitting cobra (Naja siamensis) is a venomous spitting cobra whose venom consists of postsynaptic neurotoxins, metalloproteinases, powerful cardiotoxins, with cytolytic activity, and Phospholipase A_{2} with a diversity of activities. The LD_{50} of its venom is 1.07–1.42 mg/gram of mouse body weight. Cranial palsy and respiratory depression are reported to be more common after bites by Naja siamensis than by Naja kaouthia. Indochinese spitting cobras will use their venom for self-defense with little provocation, and as the name implies, are capable of spitting venom when alarmed, often at the face and eyes of the animal or human threatening them. A case report in the literature describes pain and irritation of the eyes, bilateral redness, excessive tear production and whitish discharge, with superficial corneal opacity but normal acuity.

=== Black-necked spitting cobra ===
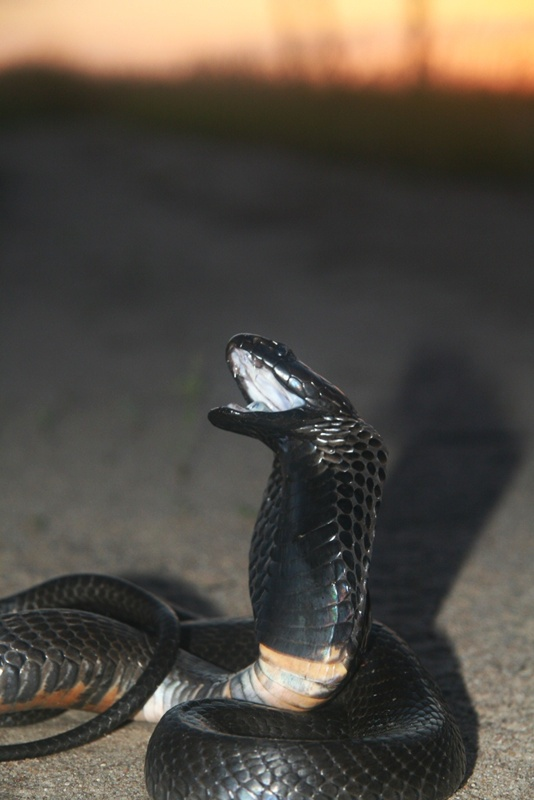
Black-necked spitting cobra (Naja nigricollis)

The black-necked spitting cobra (Naja nigricollis) is a species of spitting cobra found mostly in Sub-Saharan Africa. They possess medically significant venom, although the mortality rate for untreated bites on humans is relatively low (~5–10%). Like other spitting cobras, this species is known for its ability to project venom at a potential threat. The venom is an irritant to the skin and eyes. If it enters the eyes, symptoms include extreme burning pain, loss of coordination, partial loss of vision and permanent blindness. N. nigricollis is known for its tendency to liberally spit venom with only the slightest provocation. However, this aggressiveness is counterbalanced by it being less prone to bite than other related species.

The venom of the black-necked spitting cobra is somewhat unique among elapids in that it consists primarily of cytotoxins, but with other components also. It retains the typical elapid neurotoxic properties while combining these with highly potent cytotoxins (necrotic agents) and cardiotoxins. Bite symptoms include severe external hemorrhaging and tissue necrosis around the bite area and difficulty breathing. Although mortality rate in untreated cases is low (~5–10%), when death occurs it is usually due to asphyxiation by paralysis of the diaphragm. The LD_{50} of this species is 2 mg/kg SC and 1.15 mg/kg IV. The average venom yield per bite of this species is 200 to 350 mg (dry weight) according to Minton (1974).

=== Mozambique spitting cobra ===
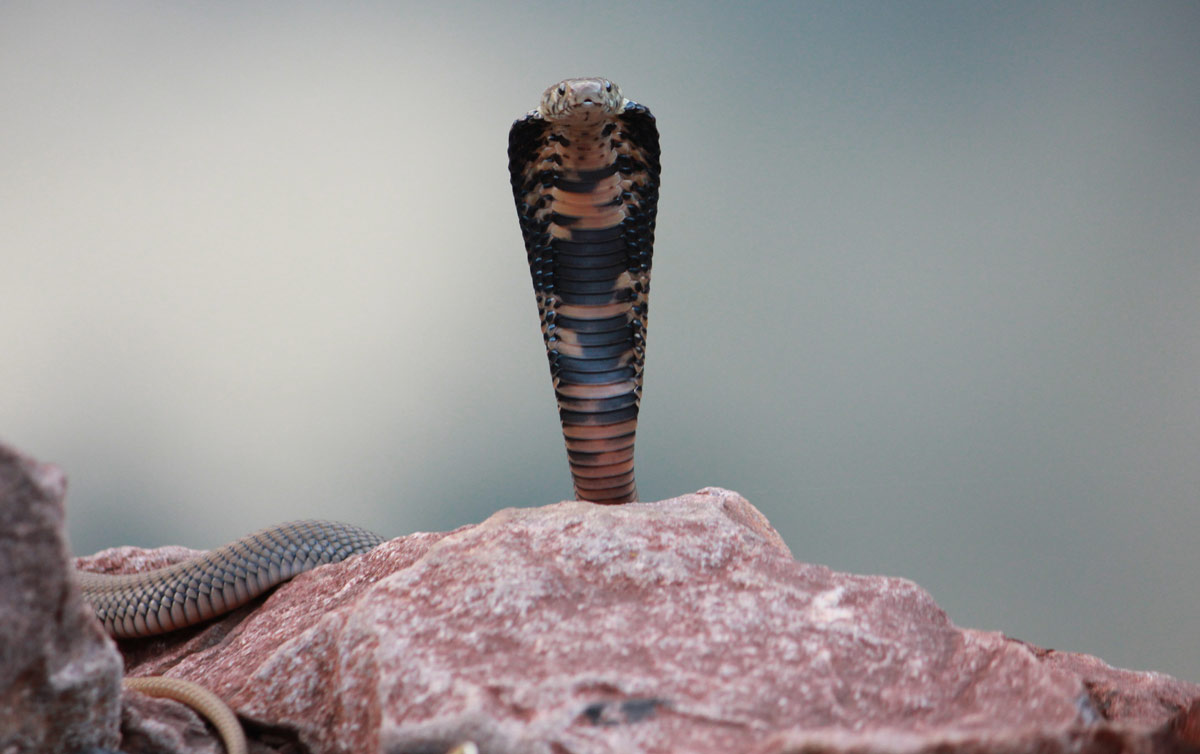
Mozambique spitting cobra (Naja mossambica)

Another medically important African spitting cobra is the Mozambique spitting cobra (Naja mossambica). This species is considered irritable and highly aggressive. The Mozambique spitting cobra is responsible for a significant number of bites throughout its range, but most are not fatal. The venom is both neurotoxic and cytotoxic.

=== Mali cobra ===
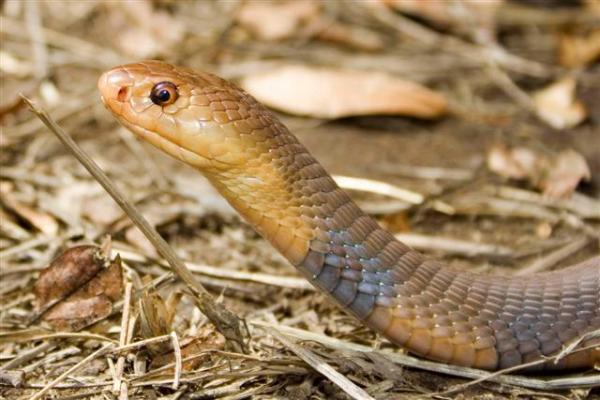
Mali cobra (Naja katiensis)

The Mali cobra (Naja katiensis) is a venomous species of spitting cobra native to western Africa. The venom of this species consists of postsynaptic neurotoxins and cardiotoxins with cytotoxic (necrotizing) activity. An average wet venom yield of 100 mg has been reported for this species. The average murine LD_{50} value of this species is 1.15 mg/kg IV, but there is an IV LD_{50} range of 0.97 mg/kg-1.45 mg/kg. The West African spitting cobra is one of the most common causes of snakebite in Senegal. Over 24 years, from 1976 to 1999, a prospective study was conducted of overall and cause-specific mortality among the population of 42 villages of southeastern Senegal. Of 4228 deaths registered during this period, 26 were caused by snakebite, four by invertebrate stings and eight by other wild or domestic animals. The average annual mortality rate from snakebite was 14 deaths per 100,000 population. Among persons aged one year or over, 0.9% (26/2880) of deaths were caused by snakebite and this cause represented 28% (26/94) of total deaths by accidents. Of 1280 snakes belonging to 34 species collected, one-third were dangerous, and the proportions of Viperidae, Elapidae and Atractaspidae were 23%, 11% and 0.6%, respectively. This species was third, responsible for 5.5% of the snakebites.

=== Rinkhals ===
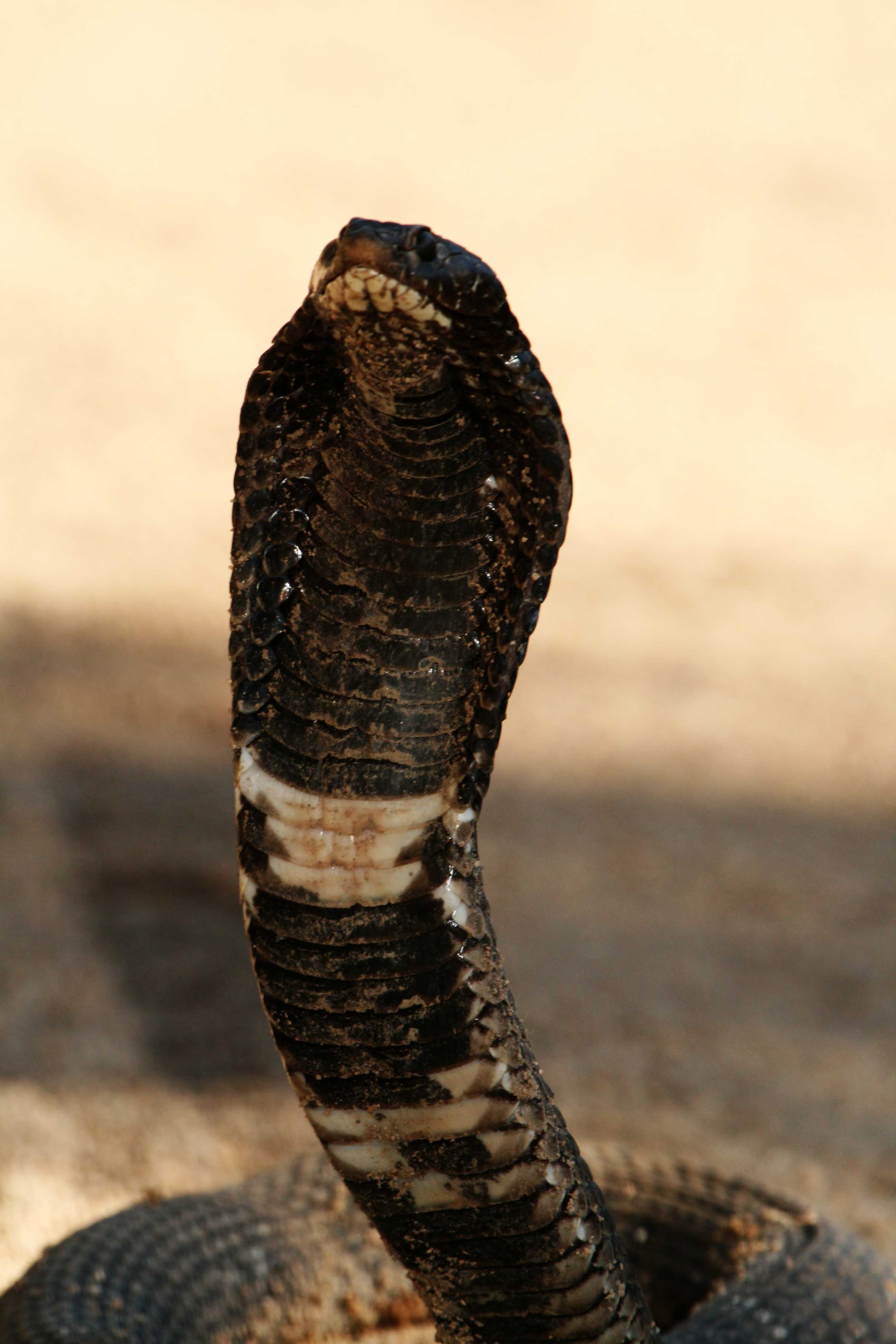
Rinkhals (Hemachatus haemachatus)

The rinkhals (Hemachatus haemachatus) is not a true cobra in that it does not belong to the genus Naja. However, it is closely related to the true cobras and is considered to be one of the true spitting cobras. The venom of this species is less viscous than that of other African elapids, naturally, as thinner fluid is easier to spit. However, the venom of the rinkhals is produced in copious amounts. Average venom yield is 80–120 mg and the murine LD_{50} is 1.1–1.6 mg/kg SC with an estimated lethal dose for humans of 50–60 mg. Actual bites from this species are fairly rare, and deaths in modern times are so far unheard of. Local symptoms of swelling and bruising is reported in about 25% of cases. General symptoms of drowsiness, nausea, vomiting, violent abdominal pain and vertigo often occur, as does a mild pyrexial reaction. Neurotoxic symptoms are however rare and have only included diplopia and dyspnoea. Ophthalmia has been reported, but has not caused as severe complications as in some of the spitters in the genus Naja (especially N. nigricollis and N. mossambica).

=== Puff adder ===
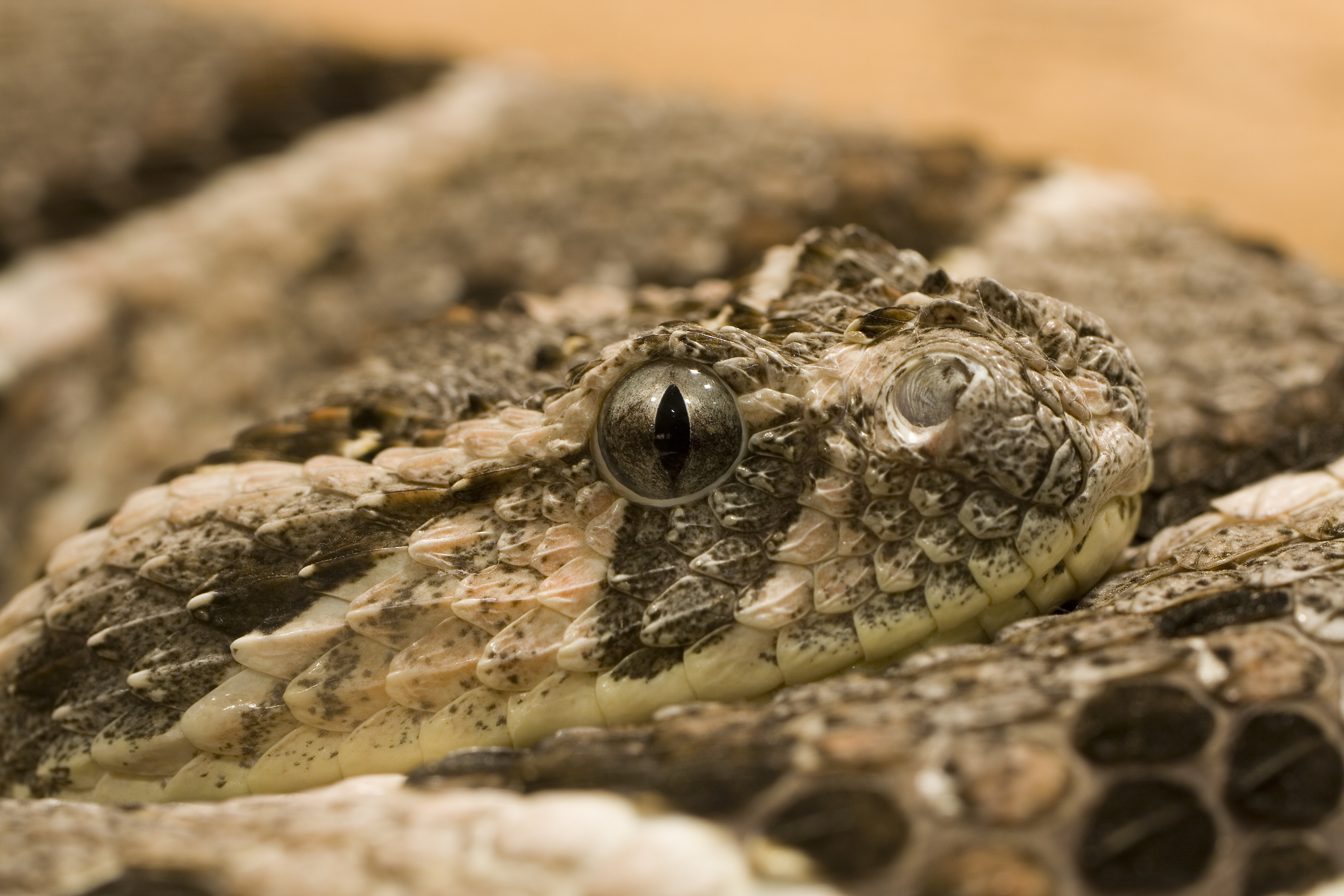
Puff adder (Bitis arietans)

The puff adder (Bitis arietans) is responsible for more fatalities than any other African snake. This is due to a combination of factors, including its wide distribution, common occurrence, large size, potent venom that is produced in large amounts, long fangs, their habit of basking by footpaths and sitting quietly when approached. The venom has cytotoxic effects and is one of the most toxic of any vipers based on LD50 studies. The LD_{50} values in mice vary: 0.4–2.0 mg/kg IV, 0.9–3.7 mg/kg IP, 4.4–7.7 mg/kg SC. Mallow et al. (2003) gives a LD_{50} range of 1.0–7.75 mg/kg SC. Venom yield is typically between 100–350 mg, with a maximum of 750 mg. Brown (1973) mentions a venom yield of 180–750 mg. About 100 mg is thought to be enough to kill a healthy adult human male, with death occurring after 25 hours. In humans, bites from this species can produce severe local and systemic symptoms. Based on the degree and type of local effect, bites can be divided into two symptomatic categories: those with little or no surface extravasation, and those with hemorrhages evident as ecchymosis, bleeding and swelling. In both cases there is severe pain and tenderness, but in the latter there is widespread superficial or deep necrosis and compartment syndrome.

Serious bites cause limbs to become immovably flexed as a result of significant hemorrhage or coagulation in the affected muscles. Residual induration, however, is rare and usually these areas completely resolve. The fatality rate depends on the severity of the bites and some other factors. Deaths are rare and occur in less than 10% of all untreated cases (usually in 2–4 days from complications following blood volume deficit and a disseminated intravascular coagulopathy), although some reports show that very severe envenomations have a 52% mortality rate. Most fatalities are associated with bad clinical management and neglect.

=== Rhinoceros viper ===
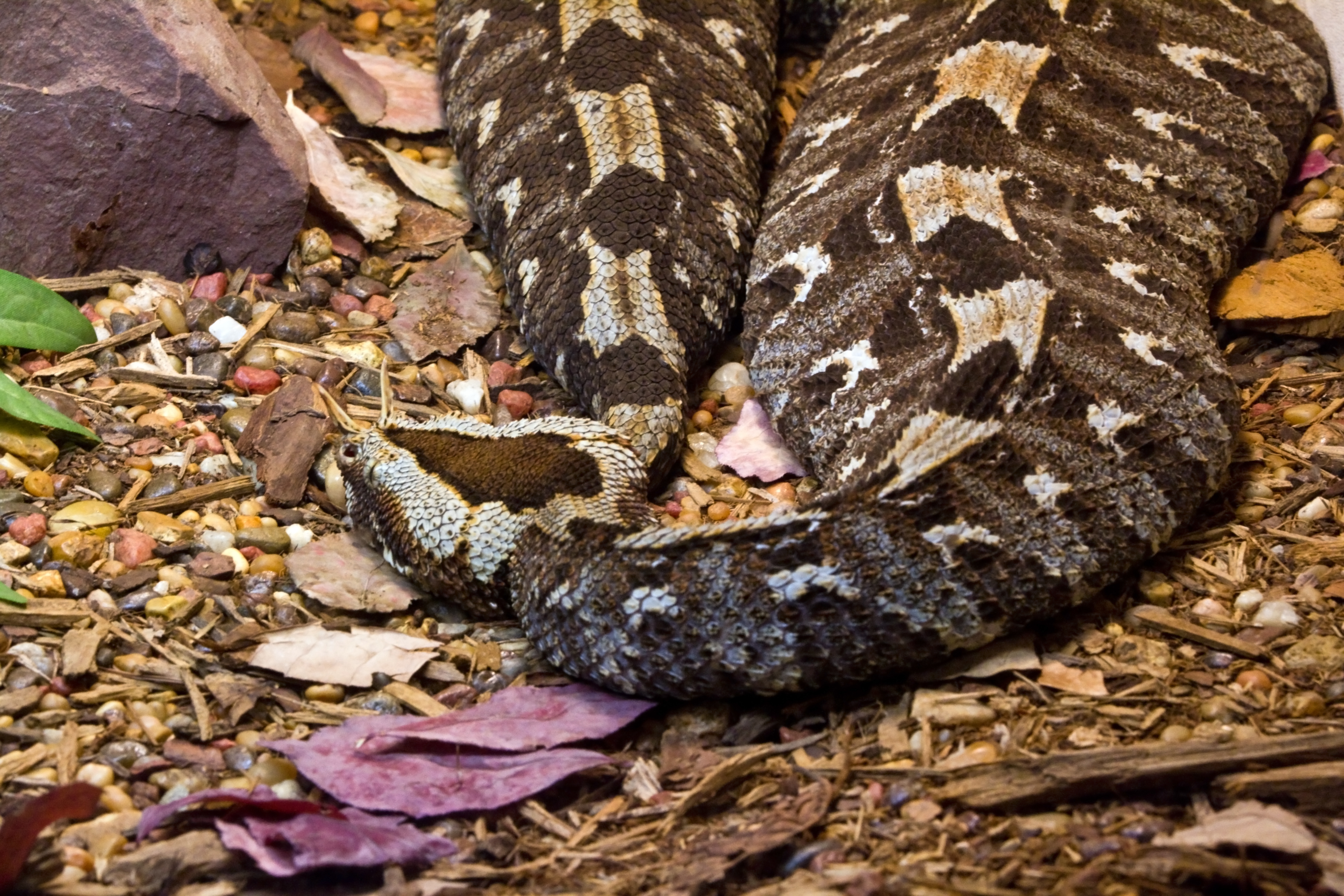
Rhinoceros viper (Bitis nasicornis)

The rhinoceros viper (Bitis nasicornis) is a large species of viper that is similar to the Gaboon viper, but not as venomous, smaller and with a less dangerous bite. They are slow moving, but like other Bitis species, they're capable of striking quickly, forwards or sideways, without coiling first or giving a warning. Holding them by the tail is not safe; as it is somewhat prehensile, they can use it to fling themselves upwards and strike. They have been described as generally placid creatures, not as bad-tempered as the Puff adder. When approached, they often reveal their presence by hissing, said to be the loudest hiss of any African snake – almost a shriek.

Relatively little is known about the toxicity and composition of the venom, but it has very minor neurotoxic, as well as hemotoxic venom, as do most other venomous snakes. The hemotoxic venom in rhinoceros vipers is much more dominant. This venom attacks the circulatory system of the snake's victim, destroying tissue and blood vessels. Internal bleeding also occurs. In mice, the intravenous LD_{50} is 1.1 mg/kg. The venom is supposedly slightly less toxic than those of the Puff adder and the Gaboon viper. The maximum wet venom yield is 200 mg. In only a few detailed reports of human envenomation, massive swelling, which may lead to necrosis, had been described. In 2003, a man in Dayton, Ohio, who was keeping a specimen as a pet, was bitten and subsequently died. At least one antivenom protects specifically against bites from this species: India Antiserum Africa Polyvalent.

=== Australian black snakes ===
==== King brown snake ====
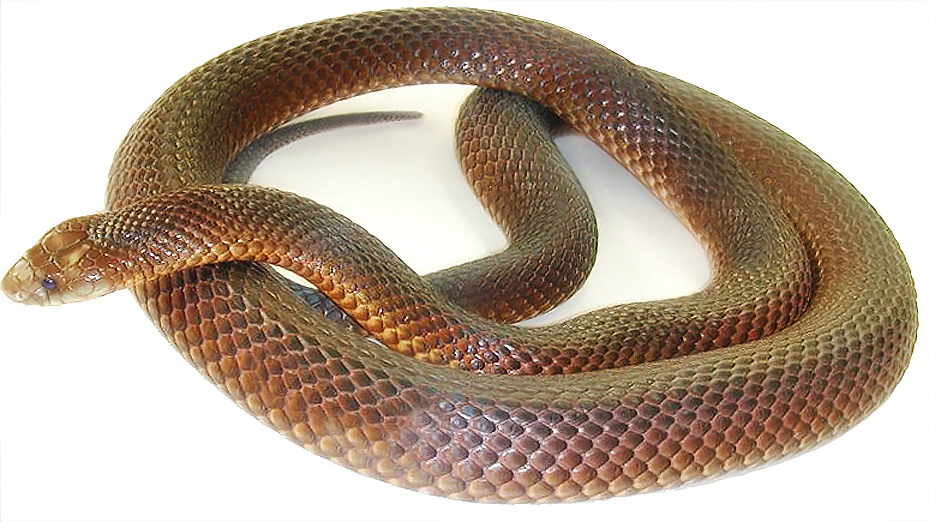
King brown snake (Pseudechis australis)

The king brown snake (Pseudechis australis) or mulga snake is the largest species of venomous snake in Australia. The venom of this snake is relatively weak compared to many other Australian species. The LD_{50} is 2.38 mg/kg subcutaneous. However, these snakes can deliver large amounts of venom when they bite, compensating for the lower venom potency. Average venom yield is 180 mg and they have a maximum yield of 600 mg. The venom of this species contains potent myotoxins and anticoagulants, that can inhibit blood clotting. The neurotoxic components are weak. This snake can cause severe envenomation of humans. They are a moderately common cause of snakebites and uncommonly to rarely cause snakebite deaths in Australia at present. Envenomation can cause anticoagulation coagulopathy, kidney damage or kidney failure. They do not cause significant neurotoxic paralysis (muscle weakness, respiratory failure), though rarely they may cause ptosis (drooping of the upper eyelids). Bites can also cause myolysis (rhabdomyolysis, muscle damage) which can be very severe and is the major effect of bites. Rate of envenomation is 40–60%, while untreated mortality rate is 30–40%.

==== Red-bellied black snake ====
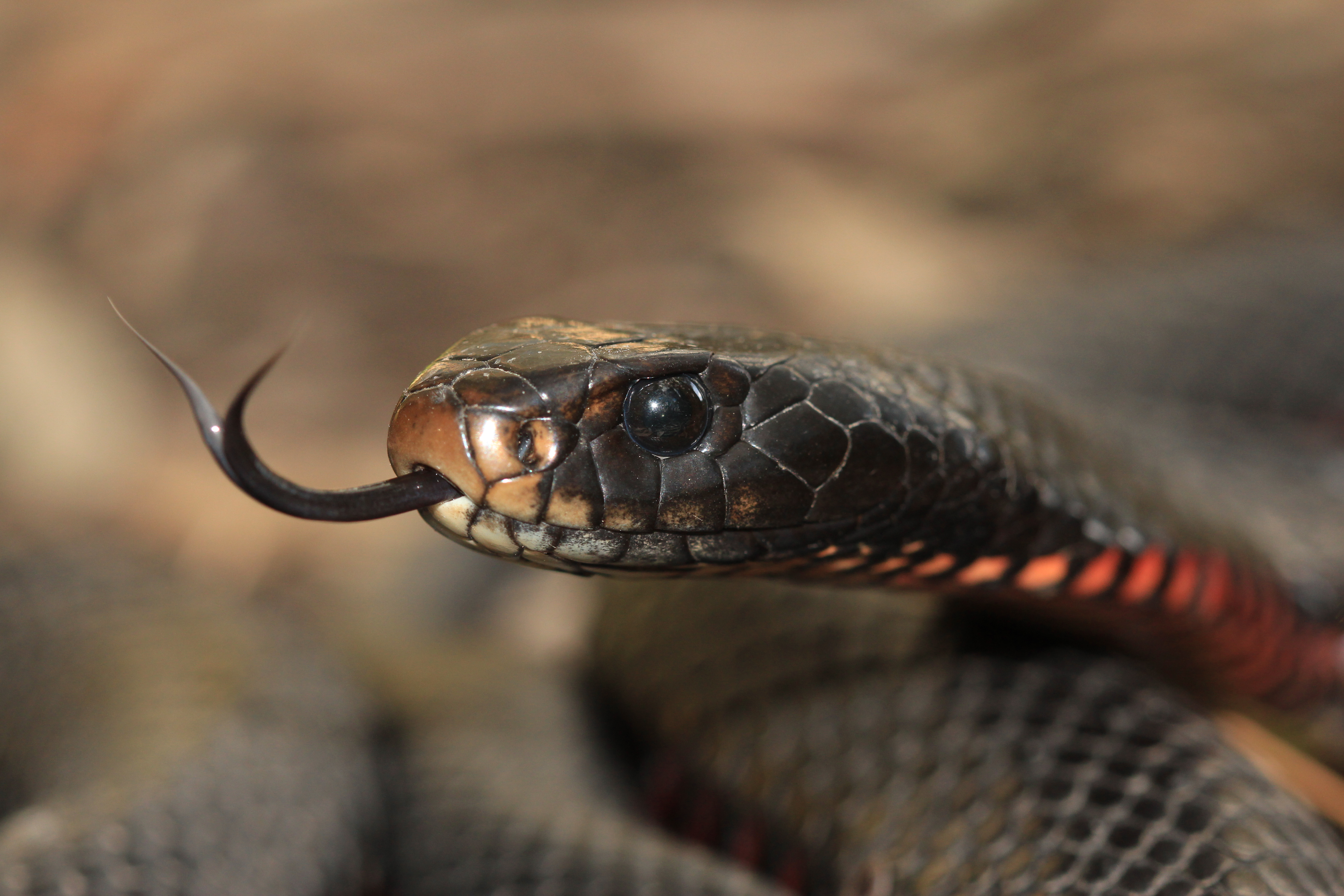
A closeup of a red-bellied black snake, showing its paler snout and forked tongue

The red-bellied black snake (Pseudechis porphyriacus) is a venomous species native to Australia. The venom of the red-bellied black snake consists of myotoxins, coagulants and also has haemolytic and cytotoxic properties. It also contains weak pre-synaptic neurotoxins. The murine LD_{50} is 2.52 mg/kg SC. Average venom yield per bite is 37 mg and a maximum yield of 97 mg. Bites from red-bellied black snake are rarely life-threatening due to the snake usually choosing to inject little venom toxin, but are still in need of immediate medical attention. Rate of envenomation is 40–60%, but the untreated mortality rate is less than 1%.

=== Australian brown snakes ===
==== Dugite ====
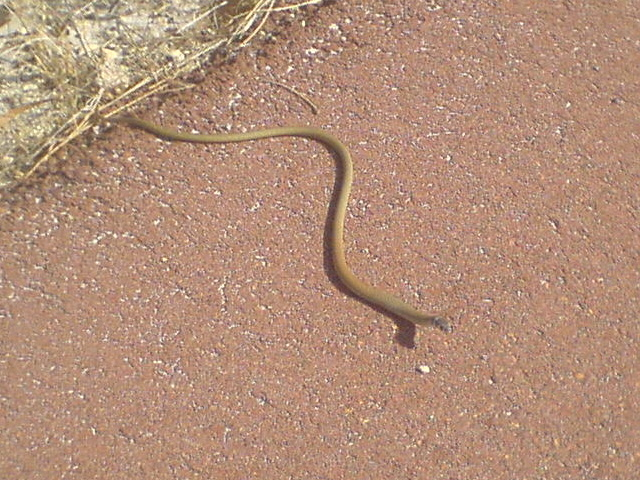
Dugite (Pseudonaja affinis)

The dugite (Pseudonaja affinis) is a highly venomous Australian brown snake species. The venom of this species contains highly potent presynaptic and postsynaptic neurotoxins and procoagulants. The murine LD_{50} is 0.66 mg/kg SC. The average venom yield per bite is 18 mg (dry weight of milked venom) according to Meier and White (1995). Rate of envenomation is 20–40% and the untreated mortality rate is 10–20% by cardiac arrest, kidney failure, or cerebral hemorrhage.

==== Western brown snake ====
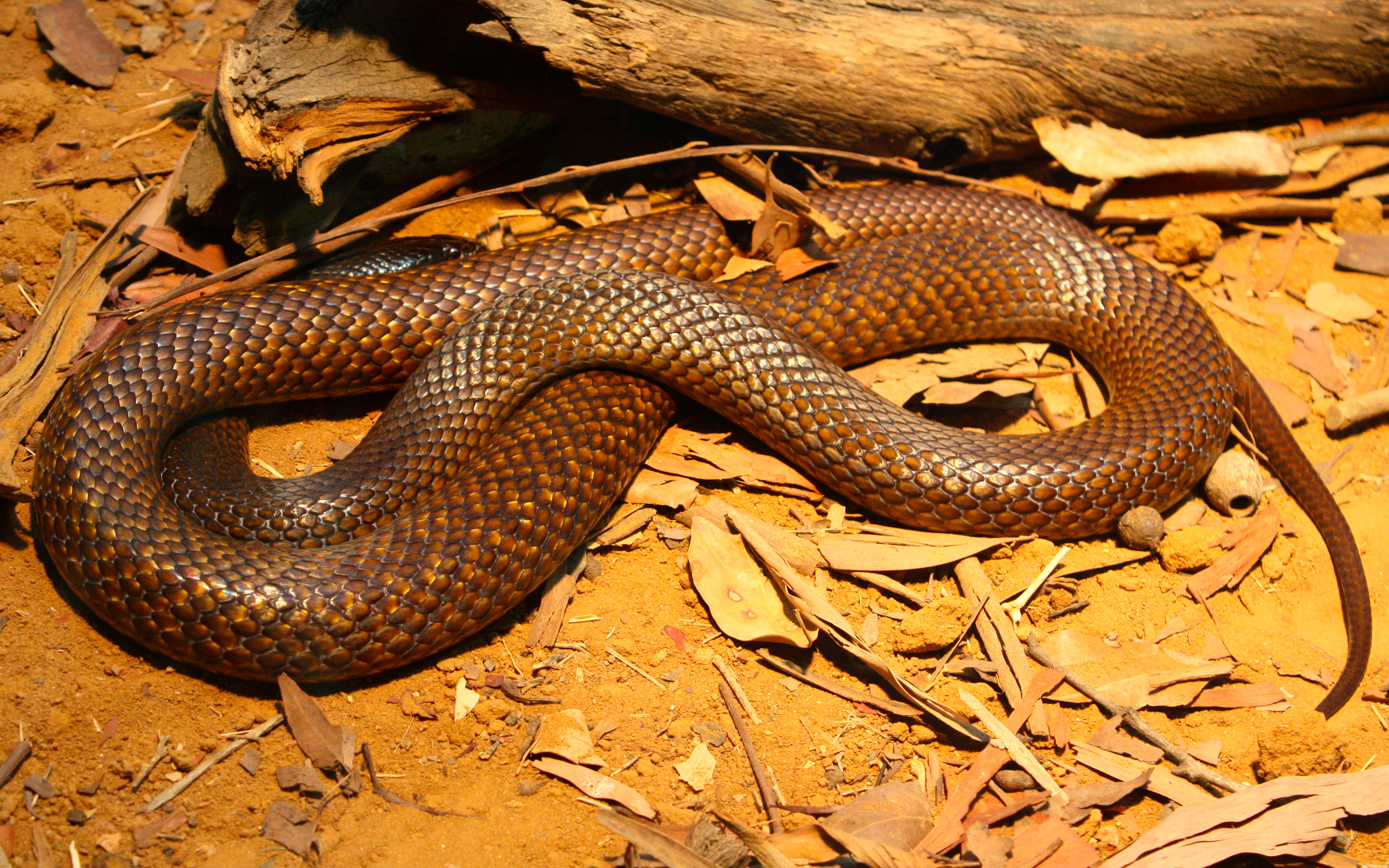
Western brown snake (Pseudonaja nuchalis)

The western brown snake (Pseudonaja nuchalis) is a highly venomous species of brown snake common throughout Western Australia. Its venom contains powerful neurotoxins, nephrotoxins and a procoagulant, although humans are not usually affected by the neurotoxins. The bite is usually painless and difficult to see due to their small fangs. Human symptoms of a Western Brown snake bite are headache, nausea/vomiting, abdominal pain, severe coagulopathy and sometimes, kidney damage. The LD_{50} in mice is 0.47 mg/kg and the average venom yield per bite is 18 mg (dry weight of milked venom) according to Meier and White (1995). The western brown snake can cause rapid death in humans by cardiac arrest, kidney failure, or cerebral hemorrhage. The envenomation rate is 20–40% and the untreated mortality rate is 10–20%.

=== Rattlesnakes ===
Some rattlesnake species can be quite dangerous to humans.

==== Tiger rattlesnake ====
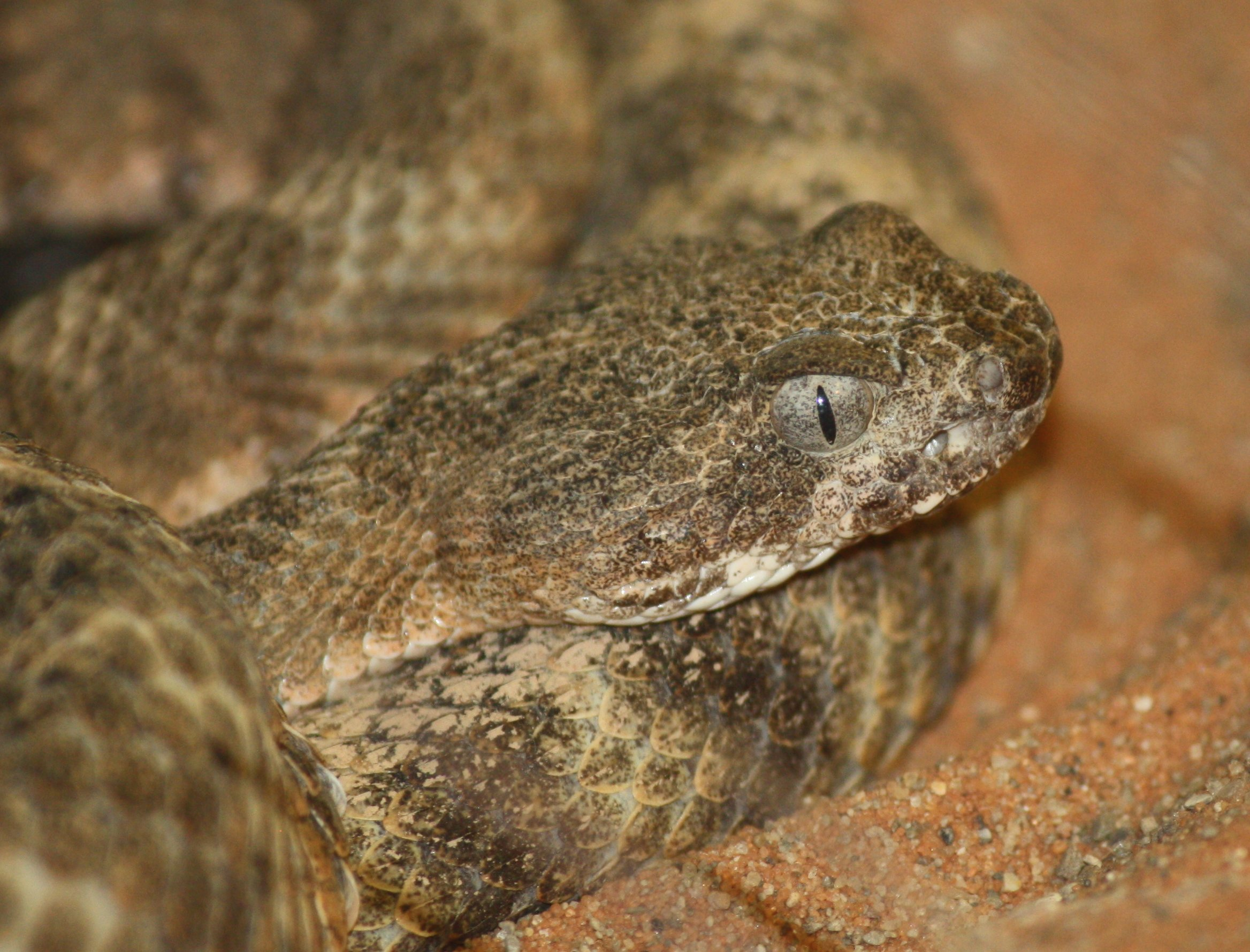
Tiger rattlesnake (Crotalus tigris)

The tiger rattlesnake (Crotalus tigris) has a comparatively low venom yield but is considered to have the most toxic of all rattlesnake venoms, and the highest venom toxicity of all snakes in the Western Hemisphere. Although reluctant to bite, tiger rattlesnakes are known to be cantankerous and aggressive. Because of their tendency to stand their ground and aggressively defend themselves, they pose a serious threat to humans. Tiger rattlesnake venom has a high neurotoxic fraction that is antigenically related to Mojave toxin (see Crotalus scutulatus, venom A), and includes another component immunologically identical to crotamine, a myotoxin also found in tropical rattlesnakes (see Crotalus durissus). The venom has low but significant protease activity, although there does not seem to be any hemolytic activity. Brown (1973) lists an average venom yield of 11 mg (dried venom) and LD_{50} values of 0.07 mg/kg IP, 0.056 mg/kg IV, and 0.21 mg/kg SC. Minton and Weinstein (1984) list an average venom yield of 6.4 mg (based on two specimens). Weinstein and Smith (1990) list a venom yield of 10 mg.

Humans are rarely bitten by the tiger rattlesnake, and literature available on bites by this snake is scarce. The several recorded human envenomations by tiger rattlesnakes produced little local pain, swelling, or other reaction following the bite and, despite the toxicity of its venom, no significant systemic symptoms have been recorded. The comparatively low venom yield (6.4–11 mg dried venom) and short 4.0 mm (0.40 cm) to 4.6 mm (0.46 cm) fangs of the tiger rattlesnake possibly prevent severe envenoming in adult humans. However, the clinical picture could be much more serious if the person bitten was a child or an individual with a slight build. The early therapeutic use of antivenom is important if significant envenomation is suspected. Despite the low venom yield, a bite by this rattlesnake should be considered a life-threatening medical emergency. Untreated no known mortality rate or deaths.

==== Cascabel ====
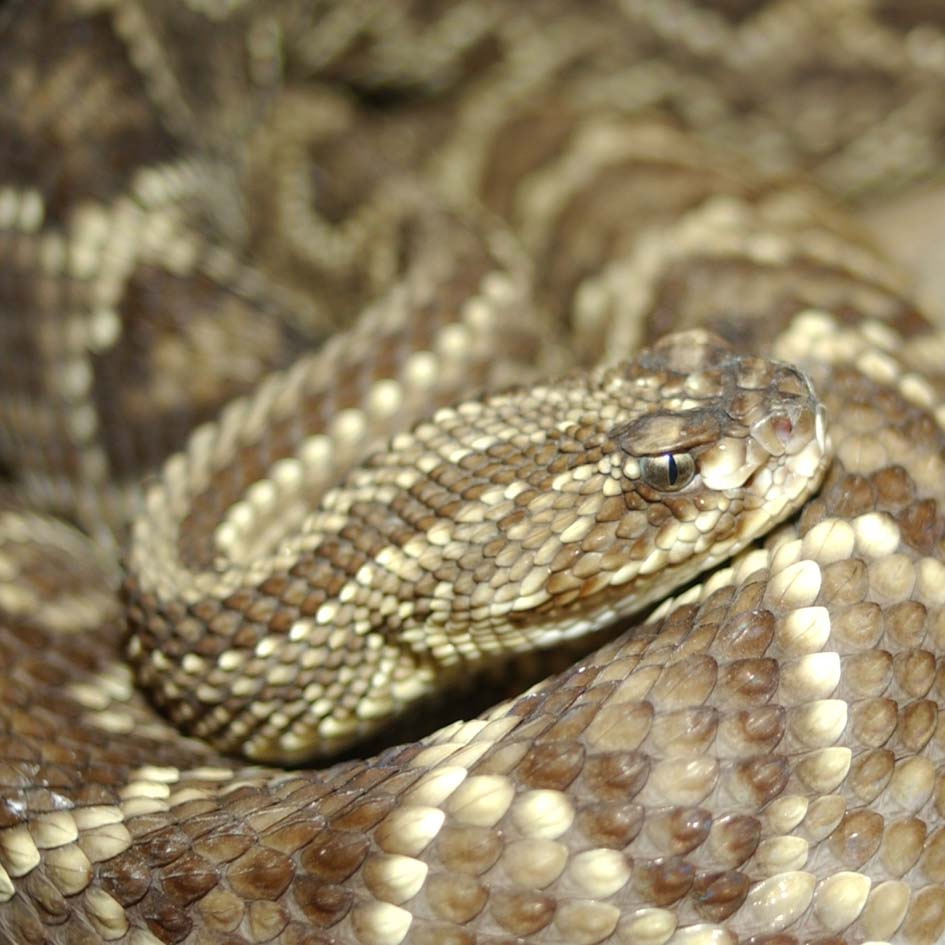
Neotropical rattlesnake (Crotalus durissus)

The neotropical rattlesnake or cascavel (Crotalus durissus) is a medically important species due to its venom toxicity and the human fatalities it is responsible for. The IP LD_{50} value is 0.17 mg/kg with an average venom yield between 20 and 100 mg per bite. Bite symptoms are very different from those of Nearctic species due to the presence of neurotoxins (crotoxin and crotamine) that cause progressive paralysis. Bites from C. d. terrificus in particular can result in impaired vision or complete blindness, auditory disorders, ptosis, paralysis of the peripheral muscles, especially of the neck, which becomes so limp as to appear broken, and eventually life-threatening respiratory paralysis. The ocular disturbances, which according to Alvaro (1939) occur in some 60% of C. d. terrificus cases, are sometimes followed by permanent blindness. Phospholipase A_{2} neurotoxins also cause damage to skeletal muscles and possibly the heart, causing general aches, pain, and tenderness throughout the body. Myoglobin released into the blood results in dark urine. Other serious complications may result from systemic disorders (incoagulable blood and general spontaneous bleeding), hypotension, and shock. Hemorrhagins may be present in the venom, but any corresponding effects are completely overshadowed by the startling and serious neurotoxic symptoms. Subcutaneous venom LD_{50} for this species is 0.193 mg/kg. While the lethal dose for a 60 kg adult human is 18 mg.

The neotropical rattlesnake in Brazil is of special importance because of the high incidence of envenoming and mortality rates. Clinically, venom of this snake does not usually cause local effects at the bite site and is usually painless. However, the etiology progresses to systemic neurotoxic and myalgic symptoms, with frequent kidney failure accompanied by acute tubular necrosis. The huge area of distribution, potent venom in fairly large quantities and a definite willingness to defend themselves are important factors in their dangerousness. In Brazil and probably also in other countries in their area of distribution, this species is probably the most dangerous rattlesnake. After the fer-de-lance (Bothrops asper), it is the most common cause of snake envenoming. In the first half of the 20th century as well as in the 1950s and 1960s, 12% of treated cases ended fatally. Untreated cases apparently had a mortality rate of 72% in the same period, but this was due to the fact that there was no antivenom, poor medical care and neglect (Rosenfeld, 1971). In more recent times, an average of 20,000 snakebites are registered each year in Brazil, almost 10% of them caused by the neotropical rattlesnake. The mortality rate is estimated at 3.3% and is thus much lower than in the past (Ribeiro, 1990b). A study from southeastern Brazil documented only one fatality from 87 treated cases (Silveira and Nishioka, 1992).

==== Mojave rattlesnake ====
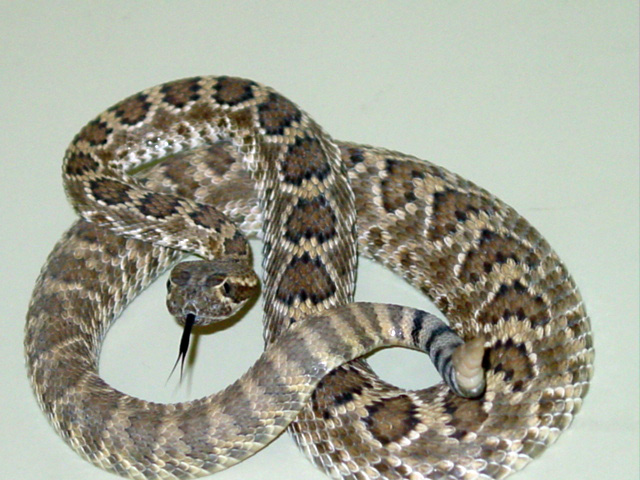
Mojave rattlesnake (Crotalus scutulatus)

The Mojave rattlesnake (Crotalus scutulatus), also called Mojave green, is another species which is considered to be dangerous. Although they have a reputation for being aggressive towards people, such behavior is not described in the scientific literature. Like other rattlesnakes, they will defend themselves vigorously when disturbed. The IP LD_{50} value is 0.18 mg/kg with an average venom yield between 50 and 150 mg per bite. The most common subspecies of Mojave rattlesnake (type A) has venom that is considered to be one of the most debilitating and potentially deadly of all North American snakes, although chances for survival are very good if medical attention is sought as soon as possible after a bite. Based on median LD_{50} values in lab mice, venom A from subspecies A Mojave rattlesnakes is more than ten times as toxic as venom B, from type B Mohave green rattlesnakes which lacks Mojave toxin.

Medical treatment as soon as possible after a bite is critical to a positive outcome, dramatically increasing chances for survival. However, venom B causes pronounced proteolytic and hemorrhagic effects, similar to the bites of other rattlesnake species; these effects are significantly reduced or absent from bites by venom A snakes. Risk to life and limb is still significant, as with all rattlesnakes, if not treated as soon as possible after a bite. All rattlesnake venoms are complex cocktails of enzymes and other proteins that vary greatly in composition and effects, not only between species, but also between geographic populations within the same species. The Mojave rattlesnake is widely regarded as producing one of the most toxic snake venoms in the New World, based on LD_{50} studies in laboratory mice. Their potent venom is the result of a presynaptic neurotoxin composed of two distinct peptide subunits. The basic subunit (a phospholipase A_{2}) is mildly toxic and apparently rather common in North American rattlesnake venoms. The less common acidic subunit is not toxic by itself, but in combination with the basic subunit, produces the potent neurotoxin called "Mojave toxin". Nearly identical neurotoxins have been discovered in five North American rattlesnake species besides the Mojave rattlesnake. However, not all populations express both subunits. The venom of many Mojave rattlesnakes from south-central Arizona lacks the acidic subunit and has been designated "venom B", while Mojave rattlesnakes tested from all other areas express both subunits and have been designated "venom A" populations.

=== Pit vipers ===
The Crotalinae, commonly known as pit vipers, crotaline snakes (named for the Ancient Greek: κρόταλον krotalon castanet/rattle of a rattlesnake's tail), or pit adders, are a subfamily of venomous vipers found in Eurasia and the Americas. They are distinguished by the presence of a heat-sensing pit organ located between the eye and the nostril on both sides of the head. Currently, 22 genera and 151 species are recognized: These are also the only viperids found in the Americas. The groups of snakes represented here include rattlesnakes, lanceheads, and Asian pit vipers. The type genus for this subfamily is Crotalus, of which the type species is the timber rattlesnake, C. horridus.

==== Timber rattlesnake ====
The timber rattlesnake, (Crotalus horridus), is a species of venomous pit viper endemic to eastern North America. This is the only rattlesnake species in most of the populous northeastern United States and is second only to its cousins to the west, the prairie rattlesnake, as the most northerly distributed venomous snake in North America. No subspecies are currently recognized.

==== Malayan pit viper ====
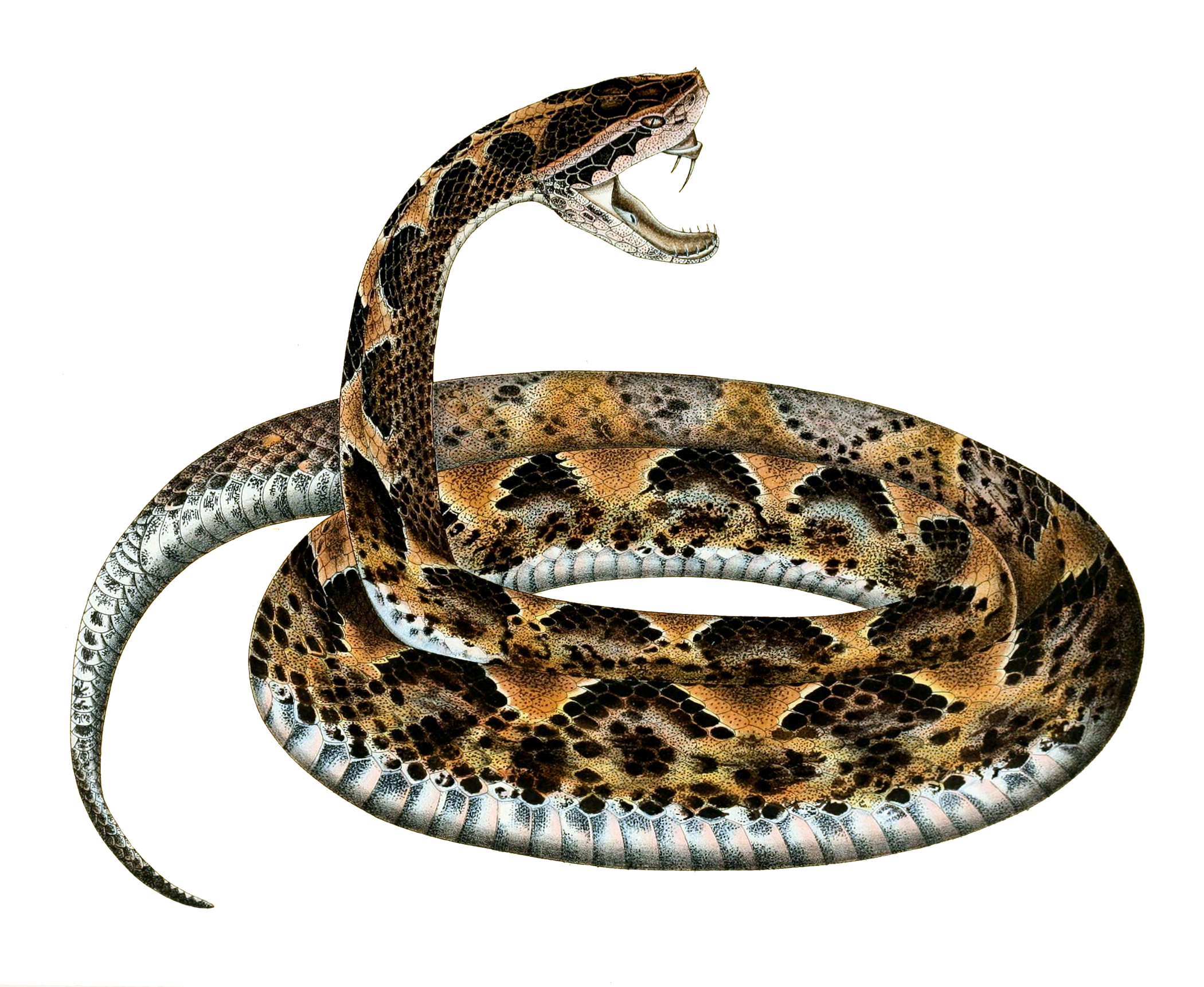
Malayan pit viper (Calloselasma rhodostoma)

The Malayan pit viper (Calloselasma rhodostoma) is an Asian species of pit viper that is reputed to be an ill-tempered snake that is quick to strike in defense. This species is one of the main causes of snakebite envenoming in Southeast Asia. However, mortality rate among untreated bite victims is very low (1–10%). Although bites are common, death is very rare. When a victim dies of a bite it is chiefly caused by haemorrhages and secondary infections. Before specific antivenom became available, the mortality rate in hospitalised patients was around 1% (Reid et al. 1967a). In the study of Reid et al. (1963a), of a total of 291 patients with verified C. rhodostoma bites, only 2 patients died, and their deaths could only be indirectly attributed to the snakebites. One patient died of tetanus and one from a combination of an anaphylactic reaction to the antivenom, an intracerebral haemorrhage and severe pre-existing anaemia. In 23 fatalities due to C. rhodostoma bites recorded in northern Malaysia between 1955 and 1960, the average time between the bite and death was 64.6 h (5–240 h), the median time 32 h (Reid et al. 1963a). According to a study of fatal snakebites in rural areas of Thailand, 13 out of 46 were caused by C. rhodostoma (Looareesuwan et al. 1988). The local necrotising effect of the venom is a common cause of morbidity. Gangrene can lead to the loss of toes, fingers or whole extremities; chronic infections (osteomyelitis) can also occur. The intravenous LD_{50} for Malayan pit viper venom is 6.1 mg/kg mouse and the average venom yield per bite is 40–60 mg (dry weight).

==== Sharp-nosed pit viper ====
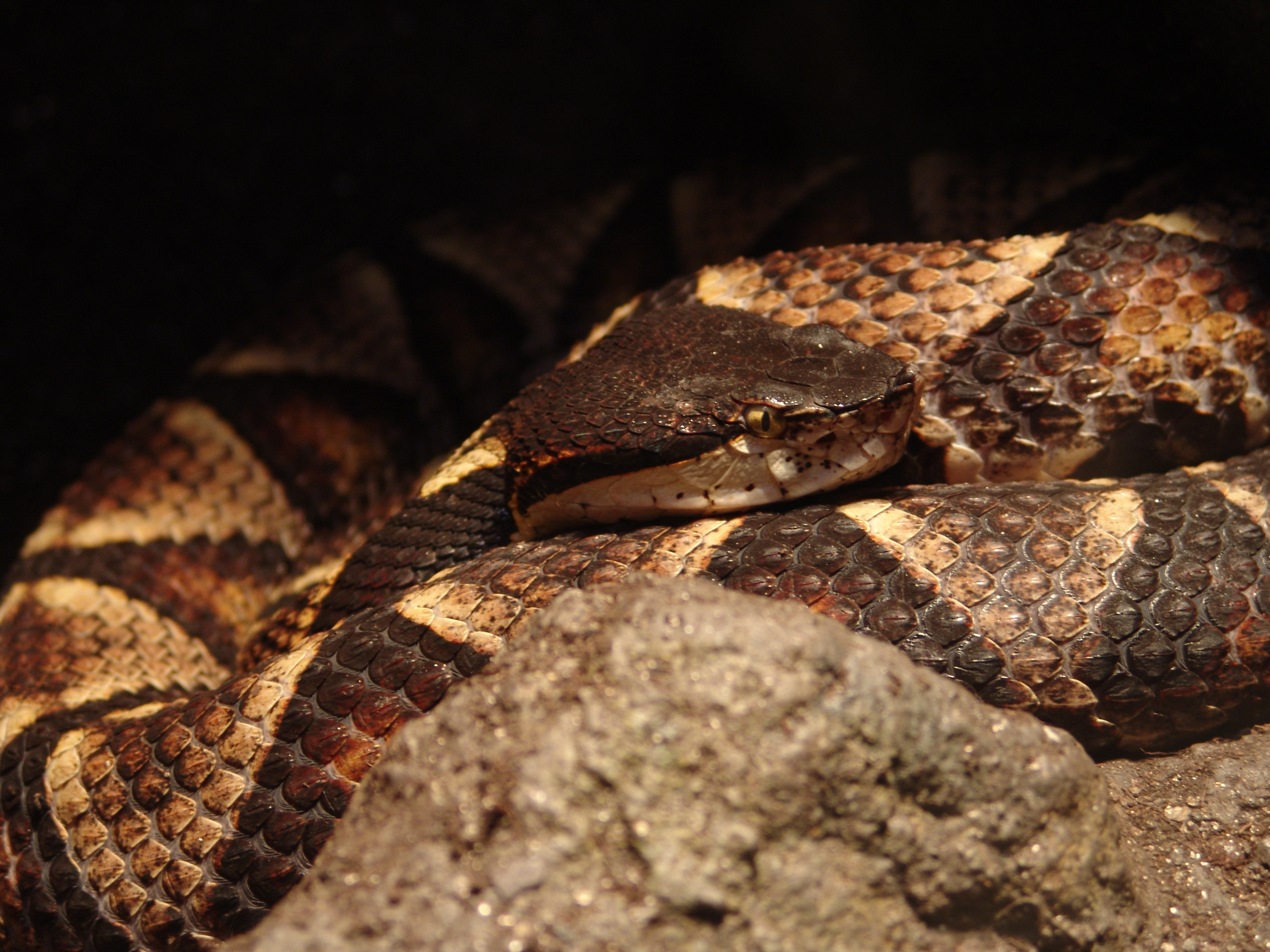
Sharp-nosed pit viper (Deinagkistrodon acutus)

The sharp-nosed pit viper or hundred pacer (Deinagkistrodon acutus) is another Asian species of pitviper that is medically important. This species is considered dangerous, and fatalities are not unusual. According to the U.S. Armed Forces Pest Management Board, the venom is a potent hemotoxin that is strongly hemorrhagic. Bite symptoms include severe local pain and bleeding that may begin almost immediately. This is followed by considerable swelling, blistering, necrosis, and ulceration. Brown (1973) mentions a venom yield of up to 214 mg (dried) and LD_{50} values of 0.04 mg/kg IV, 4.0 mg/kg IP and 9.2–10.0 mg/kg SC. The envenomation rate is up to 80% and the untreated mortality rate is very low (1–10%). Antivenom is produced in China and Taiwan.

==== Eastern copperhead ====
The eastern copperhead (Agkistrodon contortrix) is a species of venomous snake, a pit viper, endemic to eastern North America; it is a member of the subfamily Crotalinae in the family Viperidae. The generic name is derived from the Greek words ancistro (hooked) and odon (tooth), and the specific name comes from the Latin contortus (twisted, intricate, complex); thus, the scientific name translates into "twisted hook-tooth".
