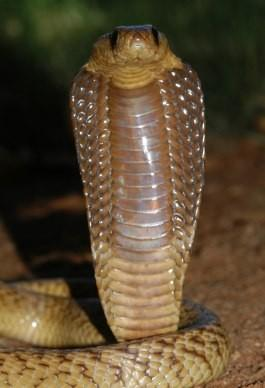

Conservation status
- Least Concern (IUCN 3.1)

Scientific classification
- Kingdom: Animalia
- Phylum: Chordata
- Class: Reptilia
- Order: Squamata
- Suborder: Serpentes
- Family: Elapidae
- Genus: Naja
- Subgenus: Uraeus
- Species: N. nivea

Binomial name
- Naja nivea (Linnaeus, 1758)

Synonyms
- Coluber niveus Linnaeus, 1758; Vipera (Echidna) flava Merrem, 1820; Naja nivea — Boie, 1827; Naja gutturalis A. Smith, 1838; Naja intermixta A.M.C. Duméril, Bibron & A.H.A. Duméril, 1854; Naja haje var. capensis Jan, 1863; Naia flava — Boulenger, 1887; Naja flava — Sternfeld, 1910; Naja nivea — FitzSimons & Brain, 1958; Naja nivea — Harding & Welch, 1980; Naja nivea — Auerbach, 1987; Naja nivea — Welch, 1994; Naja (Uraeus) nivea — Wallach, 2009

= Cape cobra =

Species of snake

The Cape cobra (Naja nivea), also called the yellow cobra, is a moderate-sized, highly venomous species of cobra inhabiting a wide variety of biomes across southern Africa, including arid savanna, fynbos, bushveld, desert, and semidesert regions.

The species is diurnal and is a feeding generalist, preying on a number of different species and carrion. Predators of this species include birds of prey, honey badgers, and various species of mongooses. The Cape cobra is also known as the geelslang (yellow snake) and bruinkapel (brown cobra) in South Africa. Afrikaans-speaking South Africans also refer to the Cape cobra as koperkapel (copper cobra), mainly because of a rich yellow colour variation. This species has no known subspecies.

== Etymology ==
Naja nivea was first described by Swedish zoologist Carl Linnaeus in 1758. The generic name naja is a Latinisation of the Sanskrit word nāgá (नाग) meaning "cobra". The specific epithet nivea is derived from the Latin words either nix or nivis meaning "snow" or niveus meaning "snowy" or "snow-white". The connection with snow is obscure, but might have been suggested by discolouration of the first preserved specimens received by taxonomists in Europe.

== Taxonomy ==
Naja is a genus in the family Elapidae. Linnaeus first described Naja nivea in 1758. He originally assigned the binomial name Coluber niveus, but some 10 years afterwards, Josephus Nicolaus Laurenti described the genus of true cobras under the name Naja. In 2007, Wüster et al. partitioned the genus Naja into four separate subgenera on the basis of various factors such as lineage, morphology, and diet. They placed Naja nivea in the subgenus Uraeus, the African nonspitting cobras - Cape cobra (N. nivea), Egyptian cobra (N. haje), snouted cobra (N. annulifera), Anchieta's cobra (N. anchietae), Arabian cobra (N. arabica), and Senegalese cobra (N. senegalensis).

- Naja
  - (Naja)
    - Naja (Naja) naja
    - - - Naja (Naja) kaouthia
        - Naja (Naja) atra
        - Naja (Naja) sagittifera
        - Naja (Naja) oxiana
      - - Naja (Naja) sputatrix
        - - - Naja (Naja) samarensis
            - Naja (Naja) philippinensis
          - - Naja (Naja) mandalayensis
            - - Naja (Naja) sumatrana
              - Naja (Naja) siamensis
  - - (Afronaja)
      - - Naja (Afronaja) pallida
        - Naja (Afronaja) nubiae
      - - Naja (Afronaja) katiensis
        - - Naja (Afronaja) nigricollis
          - - Naja (Afronaja) ashei
            - - Naja (Afronaja) mossambica
              - Naja (Afronaja) nigricincta
    - - (Boulengerina)
        - Naja (Boulengerina) multifasciata
        - - - Naja (Boulengerina) christyi
            - Naja (Boulengerina) annulata
          - - - Naja (Boulengerina) savannula
              - Naja (Boulengerina) subfulva
            - - Naja (Boulengerina) guineensis
              - Naja (Boulengerina) peroescobari
              - Naja (Boulengerina) melanoleuca
      - (Uraeus)
        - Naja (Uraeus) nivea
        - - Naja (Uraeus) senegalensis
          - - Naja (Uraeus) haje
            - Naja (Uraeus) arabica
          - - Naja (Uraeus) annulifera
            - Naja (Uraeus) anchietae

=== Description ===
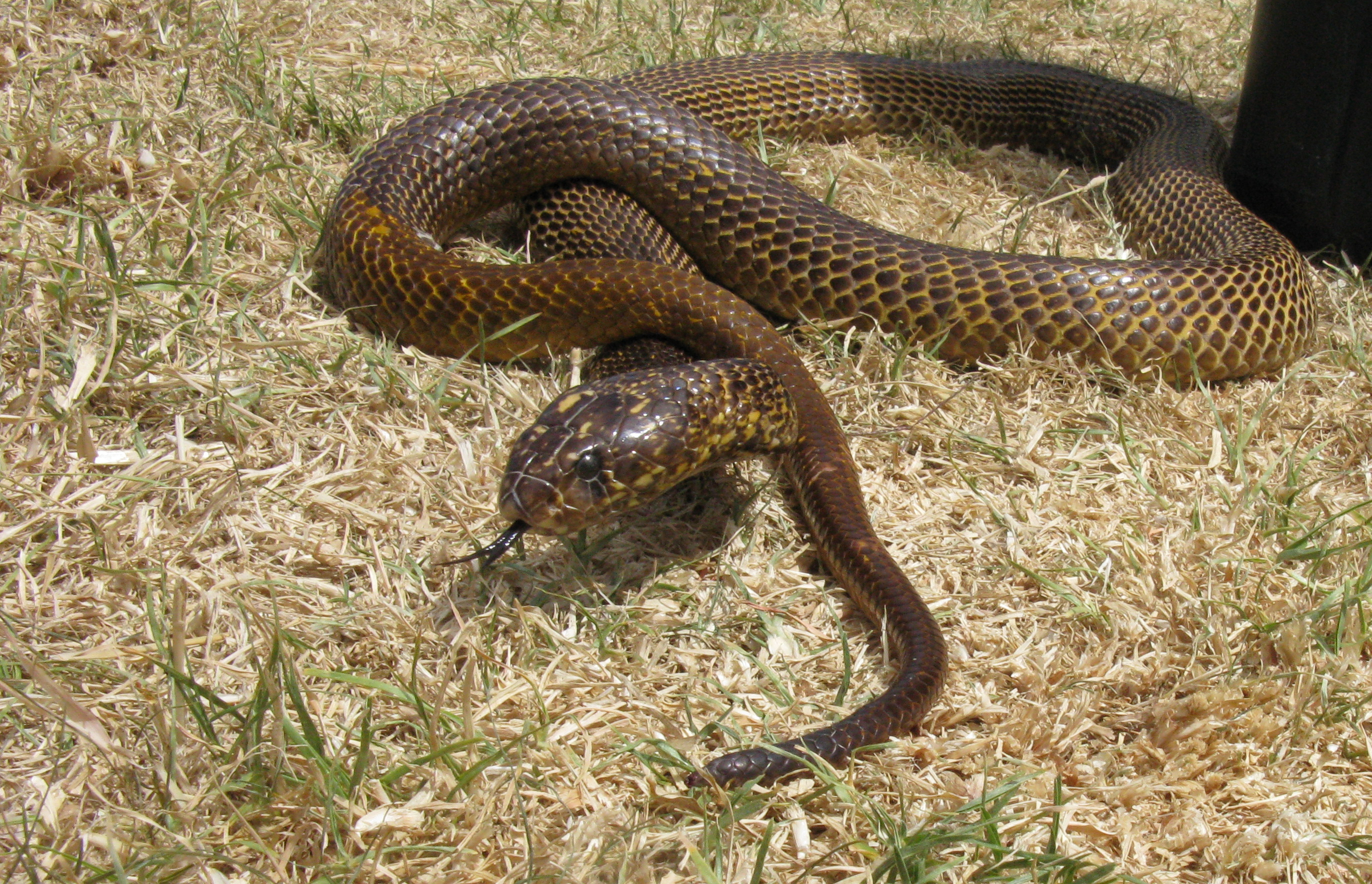
Dark and mottled specimen from the vicinity of Cape Town

The Cape cobra is a medium-sized species of cobra. Mature specimens are typically about 1.2 to 1.4 m (3.9 to 4.6 ft) long, but may grow up to 1.6 m (5.2 ft) in length. Males are slightly larger than females. The longest specimen on record is a male from Aus, Namibia, measured 1.88 m (6.2 ft) long. Another very large specimen was also a male found in De Hoop Nature Reserve with a total length of 1.86 metres (6.1 ft).

Cape cobras vary widely in colouration, from yellow through golden brown to dark brown and even black. In addition, individuals show a varying degree of black or pale stippling and blotches, and although colour and marking are geographically related, observing virtually all colour varieties is possible at one location. For example, the Kalahari Desert specimens in Botswana and Namibia are usually more consistently yellow than the more southerly populations, but at De Hoop, and other specific locations in the Western Cape, all colour variations have been recorded. Juvenile specimens generally have conspicuously dark throats extending down the belly for the width of a dozen or so ventral scales. The colour fades during the first year or two of life, but while it lasts, it commonly leads laymen to confuse the juvenile Cape cobra with the Rinkhals spitting cobra.

Scalation
| Dorsal at midbody | Ventral | Subcaudal | Anal plate | Upper labials | Upper labials to eye | Preoculars | Postoculars | Lower labials | Temporal |
|---|---|---|---|---|---|---|---|---|---|
| 21 | 195-227 | 50-68 (paired) | Single | 7 | 3+4 | 1 | 3 (can be 4) | 9 (8–10) | 1+2 (variable) |

== Distribution and habitat ==
The Cape cobra is endemic to southern Africa. In South Africa, where it most often occurs, the species occurs throughout the Western Cape, Northern Cape, Eastern Cape, Free State, and North West Province. It also is found in the southern half of Namibia, southwestern Botswana, and western Lesotho.

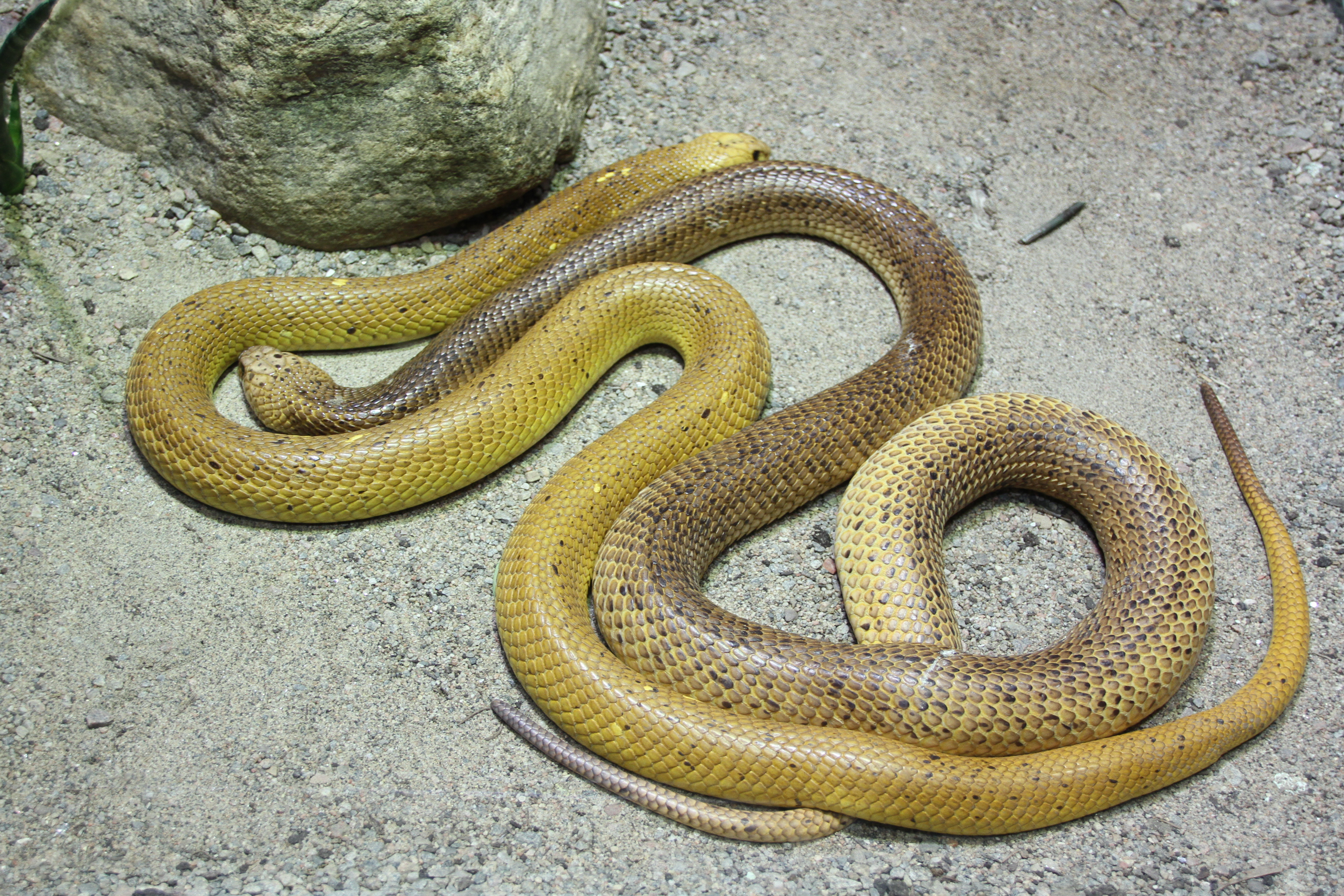
Mature Cape cobras in captivity – speckled colour variants in repose without spread hoods

Although the Cape cobra has a smaller geographical range than any other African cobra, it occurs in a variety of different habitats. The preferred habitat of the species is fynbos, bushveld, karoo scrubland, arid savanna, the Namib desert, and the Kalahari desert. It often inhabits rodent burrows, abandoned termite mounds, and in arid regions, rock crevices. Where it occurs in temperate regions and arid karroid regions, it is often found along rivers and streams entering well-drained, open areas.

In Lesotho, they may occur at altitudes as high as 2,500 m (8,200 ft) above sea level. They occur in forest and high grassland areas of Free State province, in rocky hills of the Cape Province, and in desert and semidesert areas throughout their geographical range.

=== Coexistence with humans ===
Cape cobras venture into villages, low population density suburbs of Cape Town, Atlantic-front luxury properties and squatter communities, where they may enter houses to escape the heat of the day or to seek prey such as rodents. This brings them into direct contact with humans.

== Behaviour and ecology ==
The Cape cobra is a diurnal species and actively forages throughout the day. During very hot weather, it may become crepuscular, but is rarely if ever observed during darkness. It is a terrestrial snake, but readily climbs trees and bushes, and shows considerable agility in, for example, systematically robbing the nests of the sociable weaver. When not active, it hides in holes or under ground cover, such as brush piles, often remaining in the same retreat for some time. It is a quick-moving and alert species, and although a report mentions that this species is generally calm when compared to some other African venomous snakes, it strikes readily if threatened. When disturbed and brought to bay, the Cape cobra raises its forebody off the ground, spreads a broad hood, and may hiss loudly. While on the defensive, it strikes unhesitatingly. If the threat remains motionless, the snake quickly attempts to escape, but at any sign of movement, adopts its defensive posture again. The Cape cobra is more aggressive during the mating period.

=== Diet ===
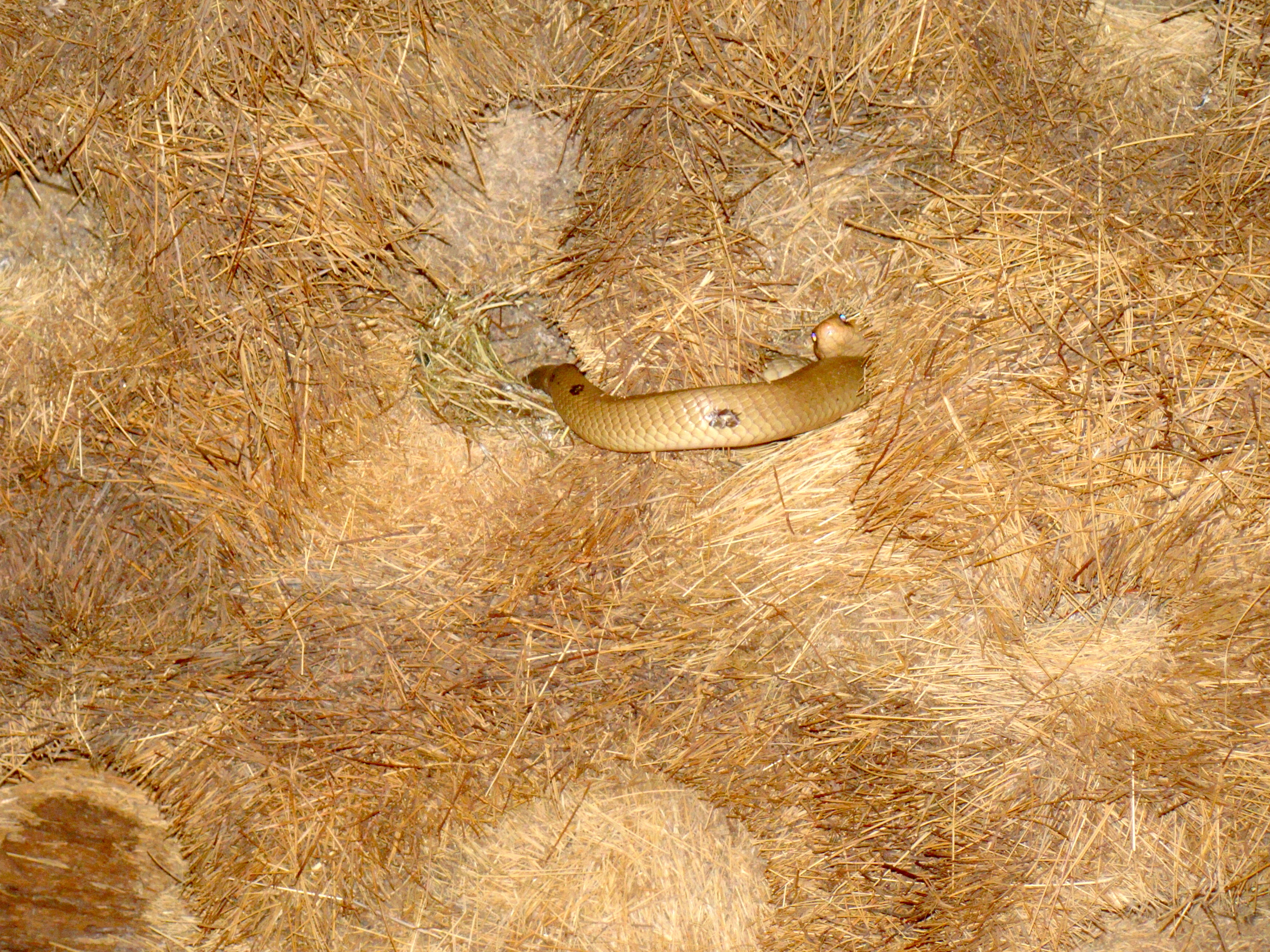
A Cape cobra raiding a communal nest of sociable weavers

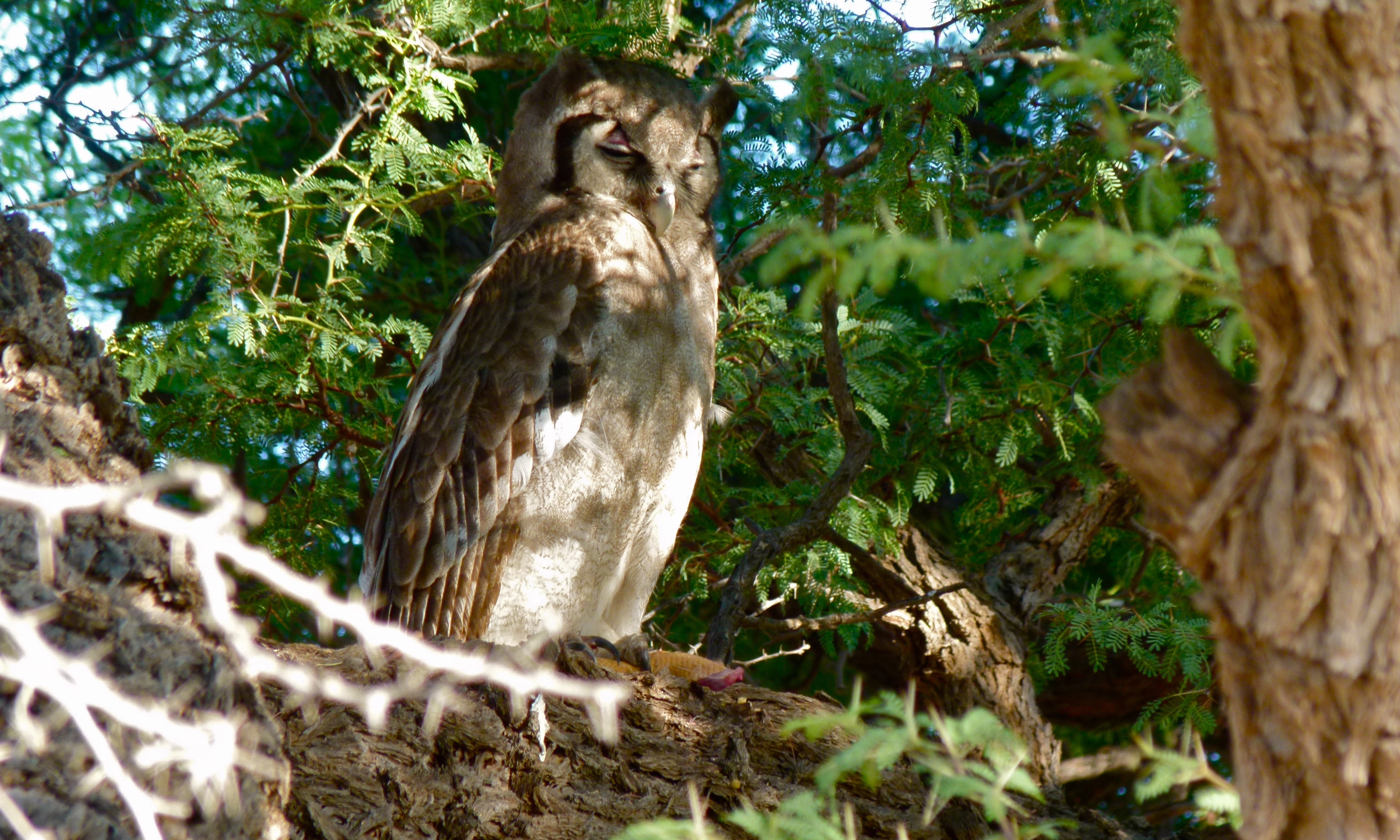
Verreaux's eagle-owl with Cape cobra prey

This species of cobra is a feeding generalist. It feeds on a wide spectrum of prey, including other snakes, rodents, lizards, birds, and carrion. Recorded prey items for this species at De Hoop from October 2004 to March 2006 showed that 31% of the species' diet consisted of rodents, 20% was other snakes, 11% lizards, 11% birds, 16% carrion, and 11% "conspecifics". In the same study period conducted at De Hoop, Cape cobras were seen scavenging and feeding on carrion on two occasions. Both were road-killed snakes, the first, an adult Psammophylax rhombeatus, the second an adult karoo whip snake, Psammophis notostictus. It is also well known for raiding sociable weaver (Philetairus socius) nests. Cape cobras can be cannibalistic, sometimes eating their young, and conspecifics have been found to constitute up to 4% of prey taken, mostly in male-male combat.

=== Predators ===
Predators of Cape cobras include the honey badger (ratel). Other carnivorous mammals such as meerkats and a few species of mongoose often prey on the Cape cobra and are its main predators; they have a low susceptibility to its venom. Various birds of prey, including secretary birds and snake eagles, may also prey on this species, as do some other species of snakes.

=== Reproduction ===
This species is oviparous. Mating season is during September and October, when these snakes may be more aggressive than usual. Females lay between 8 and 20 eggs (roughly 60 × 25 mm in size) in midsummer (December–January), in a hole or an abandoned termite mound or some other warm, wet location. The hatchlings measure between 34 and 40 cm (13 and 16 in) in length, and are completely independent from birth. In one captive study, mating occurred in September and oviposition was in November. Its gestation period was about 42 days and the incubation period was 65–70 days around 28–33 °C (82–91 °F). Clutch size was 11–14 (n=2) and hatchling ratio was one male to five females.

== Venom ==
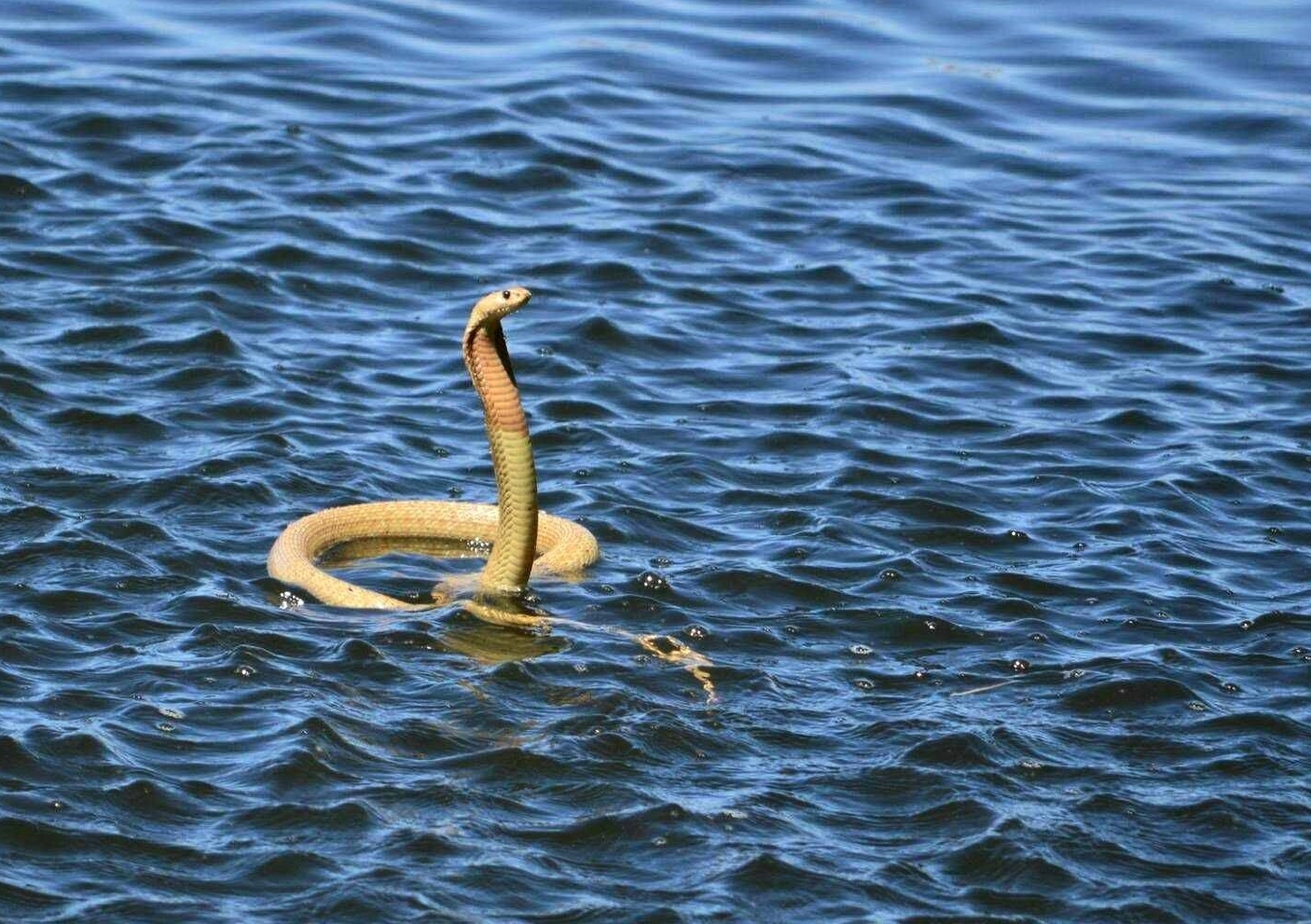
Forming a hood while crossing a waterbody: The inflated lung provides stability.

The Cape cobra is regarded as one of the most dangerous species of cobra in all of Africa, by virtue of its potent venom and frequent occurrence around houses. The venom of this snake tends to be thick and syrupy in consistency and dries into shiny pale flakes, not unlike yellow sugar.

The Cape cobra's venom is made up of potent postsynaptic neurotoxins and might also contain cardiotoxins, that affect the respiratory system, nervous system, and the heart. The mouse SC LD_{50} for this species' venom ranges from 0.4 mg / kg to 0.72, while the intravenous and intraperitoneal LD_{50} values are 0.4 mg/kg and 0.6 mg/kg, respectively. The average venom yield per bite is 100 to 150 mg according to Minton. The mortality rate for untreated bites is not exactly known, but is thought to be high, around ~50%, which can be due to various factors, including the amount of venom injected, psychological state of the bitten subject, the penetration of one or both fangs, and others. Mechanical ventilation and symptom management is often enough to save a victim's life, but cases of serious Cape cobra envenomation require antivenom. When death does occur, it normally takes one (in severe cases) to ten hours (or more), and it is often as a result of respiratory failure, due to the onset of paralysis. The antivenom used in case of a bite is a polyvalent antivenom produced by the South African Institute of Medical Research.
