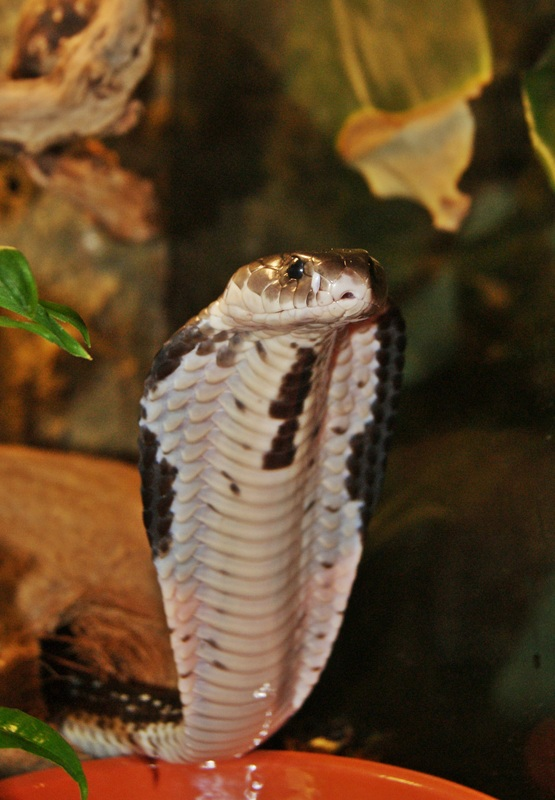

Conservation status
- Vulnerable (IUCN 3.1)
- CITES Appendix II

Scientific classification
- Kingdom: Animalia
- Phylum: Chordata
- Class: Reptilia
- Order: Squamata
- Suborder: Serpentes
- Family: Elapidae
- Genus: Naja
- Species: N. siamensis

Binomial name
- Naja siamensis Laurenti, 1768
- Naja siamensis distribution

= Siamese spitting cobra =

Species of snake

The Siamese spitting cobra (Naja siamensis) (Thai: งูเห่า, pronounced: nguu hao) also called the Indochinese spitting cobra, Thai spitting cobra and black and white spitting cobra is a species of spitting cobra found in Southeast Asia.

== Description ==
This is a medium-sized elapid, with a more slender build compared to most other cobras within the genus Naja. The body colour of this species is variable from grey to brown to black, with white spots or stripes. The white patterning can be so prolific that it covers the majority of the snake. The highly distinctive black and white colour phase is common in central Thailand, specimens from western Thailand are mostly black, whereas individuals from elsewhere are usually brown. The hood mark can be spectacle-shaped, irregular or missing altogether, especially in adults. Adults average between 0.9 to 1.2 metres (3.0 to 3.9 ft) in length, and can potentially reach lengths of 1.6 metres (5 ft), although this is considered rare. Body mass for adults can be tends to be around 1,600 grams.

This species should not be confused with the monocled cobra (Naja kaouthia), which has similar habitat, size and appearance. Another distinguishing feature is that this species is a "true spitter"; it readily spits venom, but rather than a stream of venom as seen with many other "spitting cobras", this species ejects a "mist" rather than a "stream". Further, the reported spitting range of this species is approximately 1 metre (3.3 ft), which is the lowest range of any of the spitting cobras. Although Wüster (unpublished) reports that N. siamensis readily spits and may have a longer range, closer to 2 metres (6.6 ft), which comes out in a stream.

=== Scalation ===
There are 25-31 scale rows around the hood, 19-21 just ahead of midbody; 153-174 ventral scales, 45-54 subcaudal scales, and basal pairs are sometimes undivided.

== Taxonomy ==
- Naja
  - (Naja)
    - Naja (Naja) naja
    - - - Naja (Naja) kaouthia
        - Naja (Naja) atra
        - Naja (Naja) sagittifera
        - Naja (Naja) oxiana
      - - Naja (Naja) sputatrix
        - - - Naja (Naja) samarensis
            - Naja (Naja) philippinensis
          - - Naja (Naja) mandalayensis
            - - Naja (Naja) sumatrana
              - Naja (Naja) siamensis
  - - (Afronaja)
      - - Naja (Afronaja) pallida
        - Naja (Afronaja) nubiae
      - - Naja (Afronaja) katiensis
        - - Naja (Afronaja) nigricollis
          - - Naja (Afronaja) ashei
            - - Naja (Afronaja) mossambica
              - Naja (Afronaja) nigricincta
    - - (Boulengerina)
        - Naja (Boulengerina) multifasciata
        - - - Naja (Boulengerina) christyi
            - Naja (Boulengerina) annulata
          - - - Naja (Boulengerina) savannula
              - Naja (Boulengerina) subfulva
            - - Naja (Boulengerina) guineensis
              - Naja (Boulengerina) peroescobari
              - Naja (Boulengerina) melanoleuca
      - (Uraeus)
        - Naja (Uraeus) nivea
        - - Naja (Uraeus) senegalensis
          - - Naja (Uraeus) haje
            - Naja (Uraeus) arabica
          - - Naja (Uraeus) annulifera
            - Naja (Uraeus) anchietae

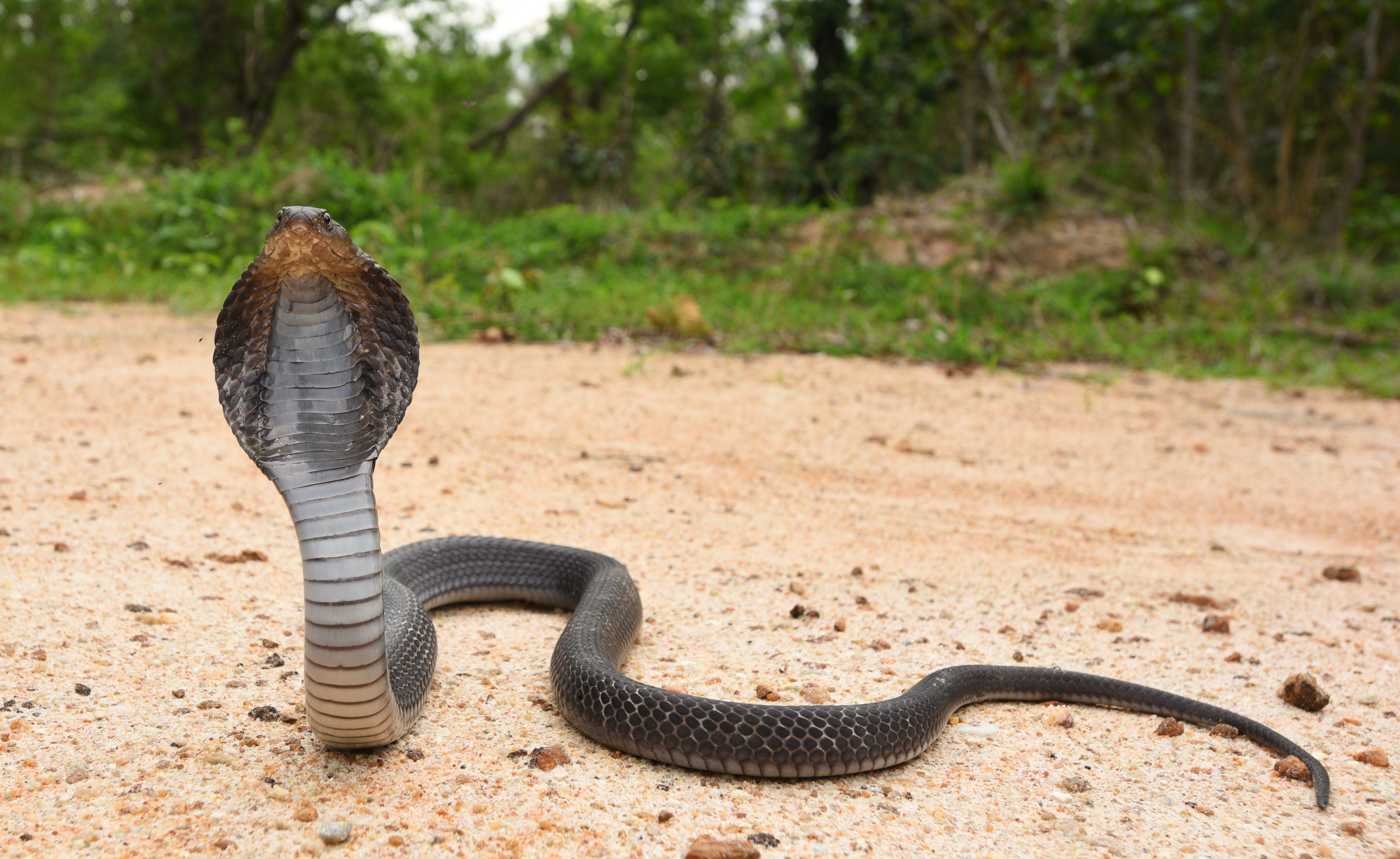

Naja siamensis is classified under the genus Naja of the family Elapidae. It was first described by Austrian-born Italian zoologist Josephus Nicolaus Laurenti in 1768. The generic name Naja is a Latinisation of the Sanskrit word nāgá (नाग), meaning "cobra". The specific epithet siamensis is derived from the word Siam or Siamese, which means "relating to or characteristic of Thailand or its people and language". This species was long confused with the monocled cobra (Naja kaouthia) and the Chinese cobra (Naja atra), and extensive variation in pattern and scalation contributed to this confusion. Detailed morphological and molecular analyses revealed it to be a distinct species during the 1990s.

== Distribution and habitat ==
It is found in Southeast Asia, including Thailand, Cambodia, Vietnam, and Laos. May occur in eastern Myanmar but no records are known. It has been reported from Taiwan where it was released to the wild based on folklore Buddhist practices. It occupies a range of habitats including lowlands, hills, plains, and woodland. It can also be found in jungle habitat and it is sometimes attracted to human settlements because of the abundant populations of rodents in and around these areas.

== Behavior and diet ==
It is a primarily nocturnal species. It shows variable temperament depending on the time of day it is encountered. When threatened during daylight hours, the snake is generally timid and seeks refuge in the nearest burrow. However, when the snake is threatened at night, it is more aggressive and is more likely to stand its ground, rear up and display its hood and spit out its venom. If spitting venom doesn't work, it will strike and bite as a last resort. When biting, this species tends to hold on and chew savagely. It usually feeds on rodents, toads, and other snakes.

== Reproduction ==
The snake is oviparous. The female will lay 13-19 eggs 100 days after oviposition. Eggs will hatch after 48 to 70 days depending on the temperature of incubation. Offspring are independent as soon as they have hatched. Hatchlings are anywhere from 12 to 20 cm long and, because they possess fully developed venom delivery systems, should be treated with the same respect as adults. Some hatchlings can be as long as 32 cm.

== Venom ==
Like most other spitting cobras, its venom is primarily a postsynaptic neurotoxin and cytotoxin (necrotizing or tissue-death). Like all cobras, this species shows variation in venom toxicity based on different factors (diet, locality, etc.). In a study of specimens from Thailand, the IV LD_{50} was 0.28 μg/g (0.18-0.42 μg/g). Fischer and Kabara (1967) listed a value of 0.35 mg/kg via IP route. Another study gave an LD_{50} range 1.07-1.42 mg/gram of mouse body weight. Bite symptoms include pain, swelling and necrosis around the wound. The bite of this snake is potentially lethal to an adult human. Deaths, which generally happen due to paralysis and consequent asphyxiation, mainly occur in rural areas where the procurement of antivenin is difficult.

If the snake spits venom into the eyes of an individual, the individual will experience immediate and severe pain as well as temporary and sometimes even permanent blindness.

=== Cases ===
In a national hospital based survey of snakes responsible for bites in Thailand, 10% of all dead snakes brought by snake-bitten patients were of this species (described as "Naja atra northern spitting cobra"). Neurotoxic signs (ptosis and difficulty in breathing) were observed in 12 of the 114 cases (10.5%). Local swelling and necrosis were common, but many of the patients were followed up for too short a time to allow precise assessment of the incidence of these effects. Swelling and necrosis, comparable in all respects with that following bites by N. kaouthia, in patients envenomed by N. siamensis in Ubon and Kanchanaburi in Thailand.
