= Spitting cobra =

Common name for several snakes

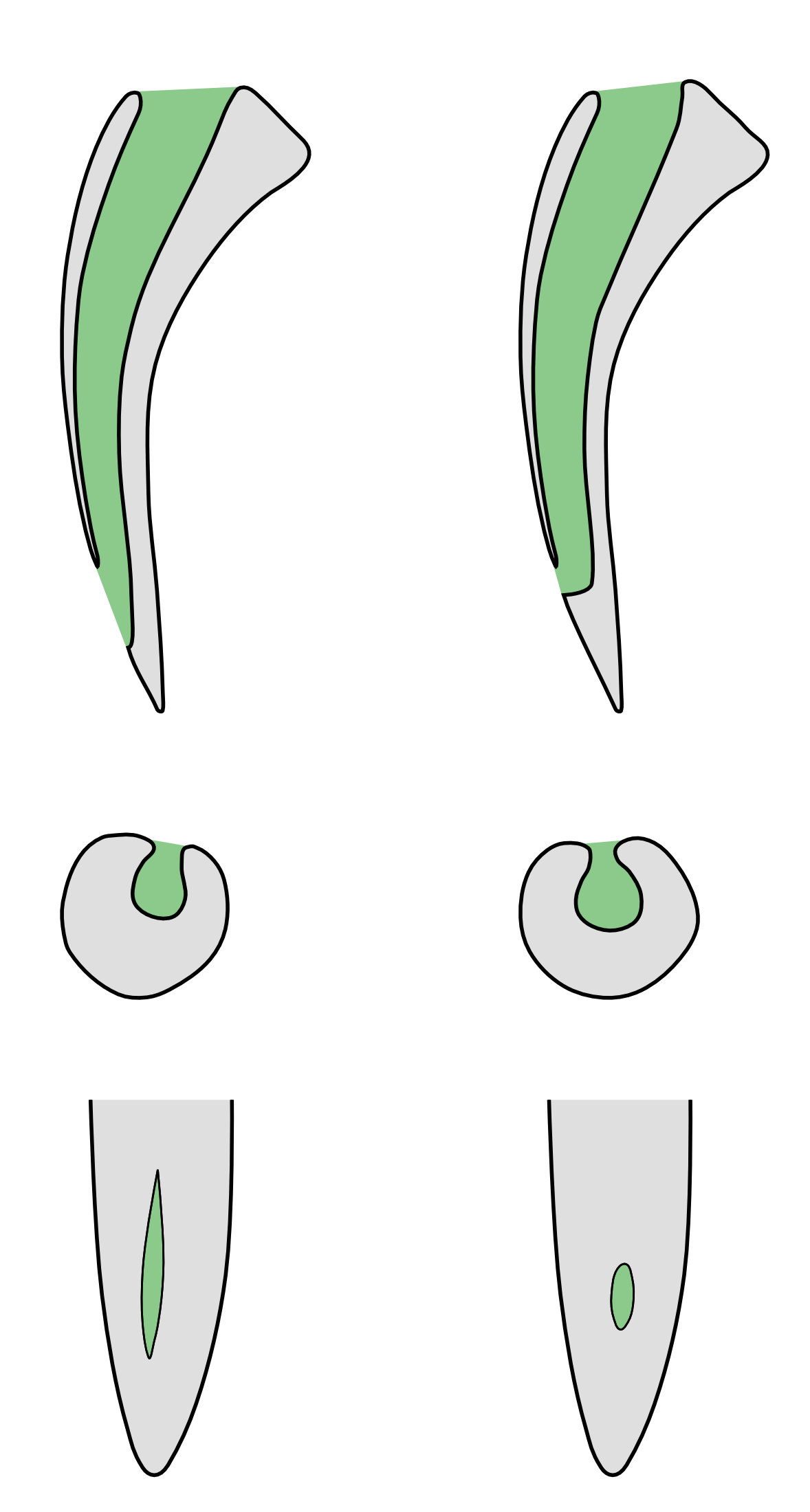
Schematic comparison between sections of non-spitting cobra fangs (left) and spitting (right). 1: Section of the whole fang in the sagittal plane. 2: Horizontal section through the fang at the discharge orifice. 3: Frontal view of the discharge orifices.

The term "spitting cobra" is commonly used to refer to several species of cobra that can intentionally, defensively shoot their venom directly from their fangs. This substance has two functions, with the first being as venom that can be absorbed via the victim’s eyes, mouth, or nose (or any mucous membrane or existing wound), and secondly as a toxungen, which can be sprayed on the target surface.

Their ability to target and shoot venom is used in several different ways, self-defense being the most common instance. Studies have shown that the targets (at which the cobras shoot) are far from random; rather, spitting cobras consciously take aim, directing their spray to the eyes and face of an aggressor with 90% accuracy. In a remarkable case of convergent evolution, the individual cobra species evolved the ability to spit venom independently.

== Overview ==
Venomous snakes use venom as both a defensive and predatory mechanism, which includes the spitting cobras. Spitting cobras belong to the Elapidae, which comprises the cobras, mambas, coral snakes, kraits, taipans, death adders, and sea snakes.

Spitting cobras typically inhabit dry savanna and semi-arid environments, particularly the hotter, open areas of sub-Saharan Africa. They use venom primarily as a means of defense: spitting cobras have the ability to project venom several metres away from its location, and to accurately target the face of a potential threat. The cobras can measure and adjust the venom dosage being delivered, based on the size and relative distance of their target, in order to ensure the highest envenomation potential possible.

A 2021 study showed that the evolution of spitting in three cobra lineages, which are Hemachatus along with some African and Asian Naja species, corresponds to the separation of the human and chimpanzee evolutionary lineages in Africa and the arrival of Homo erectus in Asia. The authors therefore hypothesize that the arrival of bipedal, tool-using primates may have triggered the evolution of spitting in cobras.

== Toxicity ==
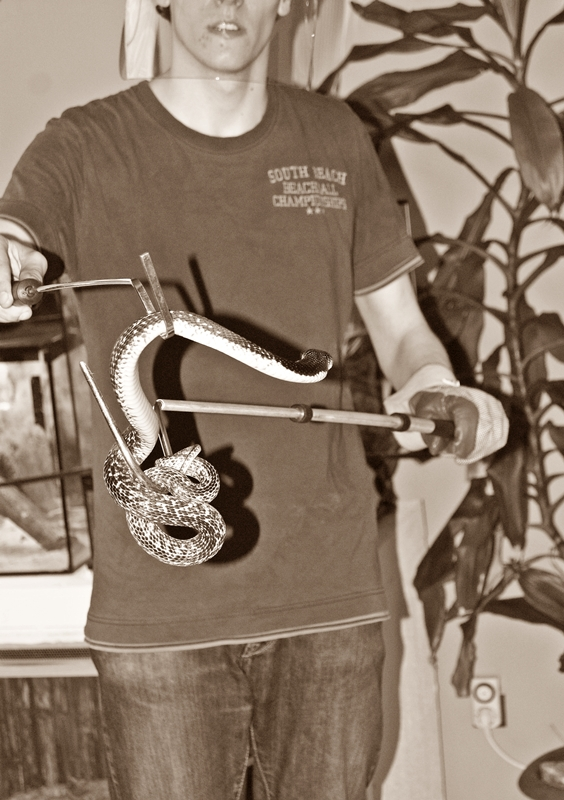
Handling of Siamese spitting cobra (Naja siamensis), using full-face protection

Most spitting cobras' venom/toxungen is significantly cytotoxic, apart from the neurotoxic and cardiotoxic effects typical of other cobra species. The ability to spit likely evolved in cobras three times independently through convergent evolution. In each of these three events, the venom convergently evolved to be more effective at creating pain in mammals to serve as a better deterrent, with each of the three origins roughly correlating with the evolution and/or arrival of early hominins.

The toxungen sprays out in distinctive geometric patterns when muscles squeeze the glands to squirt it out through forward-facing holes near the tips of the fangs. Individuals of some species of spitting cobras make hissing exhalations/lunging movements of their heads when "spitting", and such actions may assist in propelling the venom, but research does not support the hypothesis that they play any major functional part except possibly enhancing the threatening effect of the behaviour. When cornered, some species "spit" their toxungen as far as 2 m (6.6 ft).

The spat toxungen is generally harmless on intact mammalian skin (although contact can result in delayed blistering of the area), but can cause permanent blindness if introduced to the eye; if left untreated it may cause chemosis and corneal swelling. Spitting cobras evolved higher pain-inducing venom through increased phospholipase A2 levels, which potentiate the pain-inducing action of the cytotoxins present in most cobra venoms.

While spitting is typically their primary form of defense, all spitting cobras are still able to envenomate by biting. Bites are their primary method of killing prey, and delivers more venom than spitting, which is a purely antipredatory behavior.

== Species ==
African cobras:

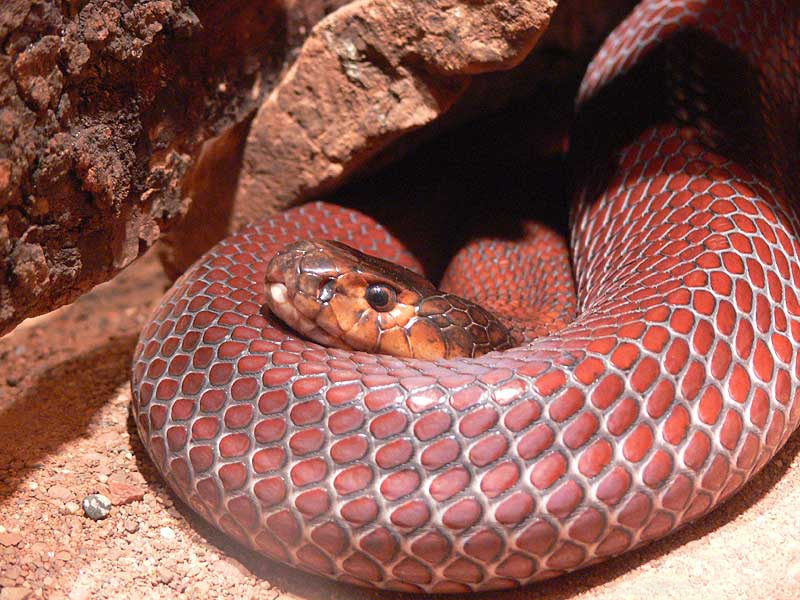
Red spitting cobra (Naja pallida)

Black-necked spitting cobra (Naja nigricollis)

- Hemachatus haemachatus (Rinkhals)
- Naja ashei (Giant spitting cobra)
- Naja katiensis (Mali cobra)
- Naja mossambica (Mozambique spitting cobra)
- Naja nigricincta (Western barred spitting cobra)
  - Naja nigricincta woodi (Black spitting cobra)
- Naja nigricollis (Black-necked spitting cobra)
- Naja nubiae (Nubian spitting cobra)
- Naja pallida (Red spitting cobra)

Asian cobras:

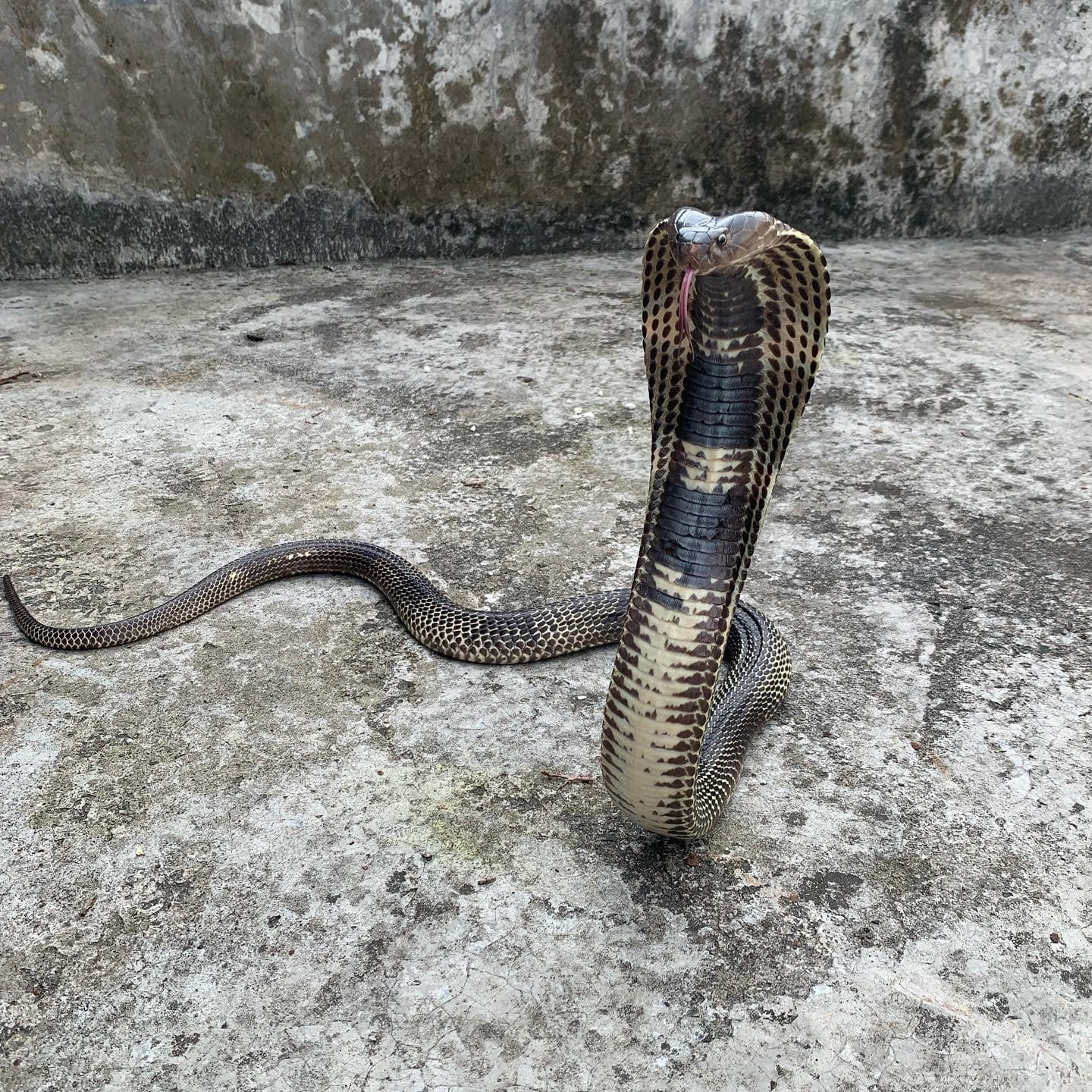
An alert, ready to attack Mandalay spitting cobra (Naja mandalayensis)

Philippine cobra (Naja philippinensis)

- Naja atra (Chinese cobra) (Note: Not a “true spitting cobra”; although these species have the ability to “eject” venom, they rarely do so.)
- Naja kaouthia (Monocled cobra)
- Naja sagittifera (Andaman cobra)
- Naja mandalayensis (Mandalay spitting cobra)
- Naja philippinensis (Philippine cobra)
- Naja samarensis (Samar cobra)
- Naja siamensis (Indochinese spitting cobra)
- Naja sputatrix (Javan spitting cobra)
- Naja sumatrana (Equatorial spitting cobra)

The following cladogram follows the analysis of Lee (2016), with the spitting taxa in bold:

- - - Elapsoidea boulengeri
    - - Elapsoidea sundevallii longicauda
      - Elapsoidea sundevallii sundevallii
  - Bungarus fasciatus
- - - - - - - - **Naja nigricollis**
              - **Naja mossambica**
            - **Naja pallida**
          - - - - Naja haje
                - Naja annulifera
              - Naja nivea
            - - Naja melanoleuca
              - Naja annulata
        - - - **Naja philippinensis**
            - **Naja sumatrana**
            - **Naja siamensis**
          - - - - Naja oxiana
                - Naja naja
              - Naja atra
            - Naja kaouthia
      - **Hemachatus haemachatus**
    - - Walterinnesia aegyptia
      - - Aspidelaps lubricus
        - Aspidelaps scutatus
  - - Dendroaspis polylepis
    - Ophiophagus hannah

Additionally, some of the Viperidae have been reported to spit occasionally.
