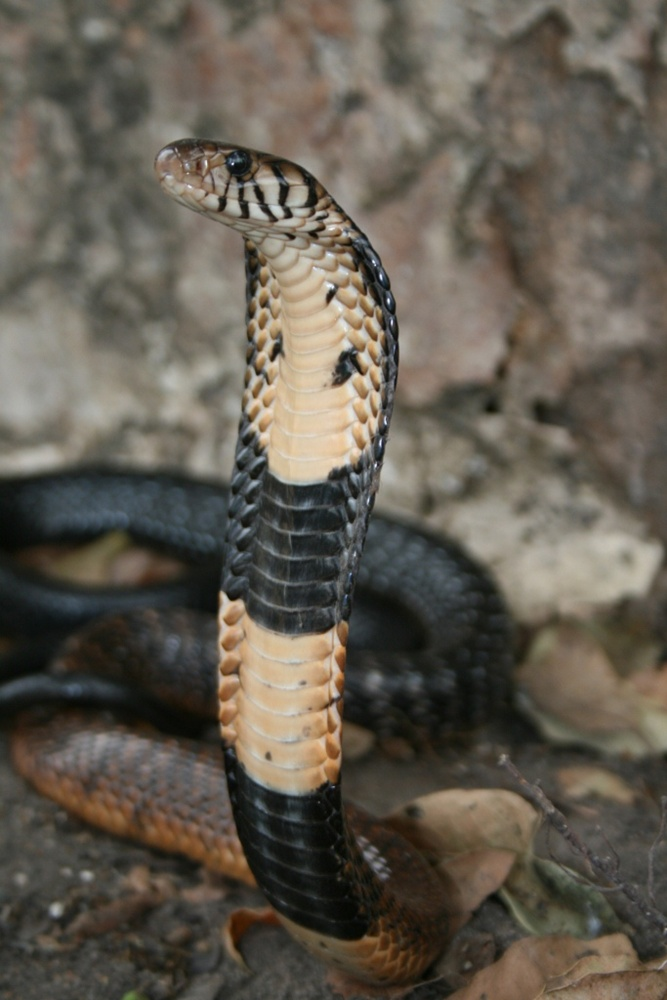

Conservation status
- Least Concern (IUCN 3.1)

Scientific classification
- Kingdom: Animalia
- Phylum: Chordata
- Class: Reptilia
- Order: Squamata
- Suborder: Serpentes
- Family: Elapidae
- Genus: Naja
- Subgenus: Boulengerina
- Species: N. melanoleuca

Binomial name
- Naja melanoleuca Hallowell, 1857
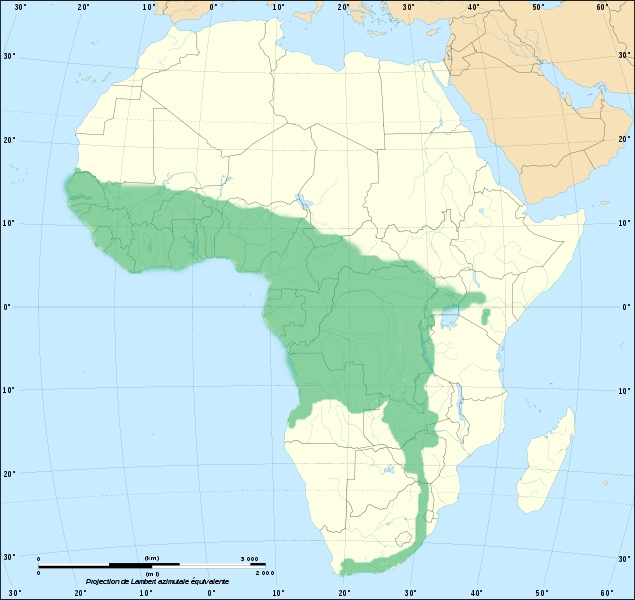
- Forest cobra distribution in green

Synonyms
- Naja haje var. melanoleuca Hallowell, 1857; Naja annulata Buchholz & W. Peters, 1876; Aspidelaps bocagii Sauvage, 1884; Naja haje var. leucosticta Fischer, 1885; Naia melanoleuca — Boulenger, 1896; Naja leucostica — Bethencourt-Ferreira, 1930; Naja melanoleuca subfulva Laurent, 1955; Naja melanoleuca melanoleuca — Capocaccia, 1961; Naja melanoleuca subfulva — Broadley, 1962; Naja melanoleuca aurata Stucki-Stirn, 1979; Naja subfulva — Chirio, 2006; Naja melanoleuca subfulva — Chirio & Lebreton, 2007; Naja (Boulengerina) melanoleuca — Wallach, 2009

= Forest cobra =

Species of snake

The forest cobra (Naja melanoleuca), also commonly called the black cobra and the black and white-lipped cobra, is a species of highly venomous snake in the family Elapidae. The species is native to Africa, mostly the central and western parts of the continent. It is the largest true cobra species with a record length of 3.2 metres (10 feet 6 inches).

Although it prefers lowland forest and moist savanna habitats, this cobra is highly adaptable and can be found in drier climates within its geographical range. It is a very capable swimmer and is often considered to be semi-aquatic. The forest cobra is a generalist in its feeding habits, having a highly varied diet: anything from large insects to small mammals and other reptiles. This species is alert, nervous and is considered to be a medically significant snake. When cornered or molested, it will assume the typical cobra warning posture by raising its fore body off the ground, spreading a narrow hood, and hissing loudly. Bites to humans are less common than from other African cobras due to various factors, though a bite from this species is a life-threatening emergency.

== Taxonomy and evolution ==
The forest cobra is classified in the genus Naja of the family Elapidae. Naja melanoleuca was first described by American herpetologist Edward Hallowell in 1857. The generic name Naja is a Latinisation of the Sanskrit word nāgá (नाग) meaning "cobra". The specific epithet melanoleuca is Ancient Greek and means "of black and white". The word melano is Greek for "black", while leuca comes from the Ancient Greek word for "white". This species is also known as the black cobra and black and white-lipped cobra.

The genus Naja was first described by Josephus Nicolaus Laurenti in 1768. The species of Naja melanoleuca was first described by Edward Hallowell in 1857. The genus Naja was split into several subgenera based on various factors, including morphology, diet, and habitat. Naja melanoleuca is part of the subgenus Boulengerina, along with three other species: Naja annulata, Naja christyi, and Naja multifasciata. The subgenus is united by their restriction to central and west African forest and/or forest-edge type habitat. They are also more aquatic, preying more on aquatic animals, as well. The species within the subgenus Boulengerina show great diversity in size; from the forest cobra (Naja melanoleuca), which can attain lengths of nearly 2.7 metres (8.9 feet), to the burrowing cobra (Naja multifasciata), which usually doesn't grow larger than 0.8 metres (2.6 feet) in length.

The cladogram below illustrates the taxonomy and relationships among species of Naja:

- Naja
  - (Naja)
    - Naja (Naja) naja
    - - - Naja (Naja) kaouthia
        - Naja (Naja) atra
      - - Naja (Naja) mandalayensis
        - Naja (Naja) siamensis
        - Naja (Naja) sputatrix
  - - (Afronaja)
      - - Naja (Afronaja) pallida
        - Naja (Afronaja) nubiae
      - - Naja (Afronaja) katiensis
        - - Naja (Afronaja) nigricollis
          - - Naja (Afronaja) ashei
            - - Naja (Afronaja) mossambica
              - Naja (Afronaja) nigricincta
    - - (Boulengerina)
        - Naja (Boulengerina) multifasciata
        - - - Naja (Boulengerina) christyi
            - Naja (Boulengerina) annulata
          - Naja (Boulengerina) melanoleuca
      - (Uraeus)
        - Naja (Uraeus) nivea
        - - Naja (Uraeus) senegalensis
          - - Naja (Uraeus) haje
            - Naja (Uraeus) arabica
          - - Naja (Uraeus) annulifera
            - Naja (Uraeus) anchietae

The population on São Tomé and Príncipe was recently described as a new species, Naja peroescobari, and a recent study (based on a Multilocus genotype dataset and morphological analyses) suggests that N. melanoleuca is actually a group of five distinct species:

- Naja melanoleuca Hallowell, 1857 - central African forests: Benin, Nigeria, Cameroon, Central African Republic, Gabon, Democratic Republic of Congo, Republic of Congo, Angola.
- Naja subfulva Laurent, 1955 - forests and savanna woodlands in eastern, southern and central Africa: Chad, Nigeria, Cameroon, Central African Republic, Democratic Republic of Congo, Republic of Congo, Rwanda, Burundi, Uganda, Kenya, Tanzania, Somalia, South Sudan, Ethiopia, Mozambique, Malawi, Zambia, Zimbabwe, South Africa, Angola.
- Naja peroescobari Ceríaco et al. 2017 - São Tomé and Príncipe.
- Naja guineensis Broadley et al. in Wüster et al. 2018 - Upper Guinea forests, West Africa: Guinea-Bissau, Guinea, Liberia, Sierra Leone, Ivory Coast, Ghana, Togo.
- Naja savannula Broadley et al. in Wüster et al. 2018 - Savanna regions of West Africa: Senegal, Gambia, Guinea, Ivory Coast, Ghana, Togo, Benin, Mali, Burkina Faso, Nigeria, Niger, Chad, Cameroon.

== Description ==
The forest cobra is Africa's largest cobra of the genus Naja and possibly the largest of all the true cobra (Naja) species in the world. The length of an average adult is 1.4 to 2.2 m (4.6 to 7.2 ft), and they regularly attain lengths of 2.7 m (8.9 ft), and lengths up to 3.2 m (10 ft) have been recorded in the wild. The mean body mass of the species in one survey, which did not exclude juvenile cobras per se, was reported at a mean of 509.5 g (1.123 lb) while large, mature forest cobras are known to obtain weights of up to 2,000 to 3,600 g (4.4 to 7.9 lb). Males and females grow to be similar in length, as there is no sexual dimorphism within this species. The head of this snake is large, broad, flattened and is slightly distinct from the neck. It is a slightly depressed, tapered and moderately thick bodied snake with a slender tail that is medium in length. The body is compressed dorsoventrally (where the dorsal upper scales and the ventral lower scales meet at either side of the body) and sub-cylindrical posteriorly (the tail end of the body). The forest cobra has long cervical ribs capable of expansion to form a long, wedge shaped hood when threatened. The angle between the crown of the head and the side of the head between the eye, also known as the canthus, is distinct, while the snout is rounded. Its eyes are large with round pupils. Females have larger heads than males, although the reason for this dimorphism is not clear. A study showed that females eat the same prey as males, so head size does not reflect a difference in diet.

=== Scalation ===
Like other snake species, the forest cobra has skin covered in scales. Snakes are entirely covered with scales or scutes of various shapes and sizes, known as snake skin as a whole. Scales protect the body of the snake, aid it in locomotion, allow moisture to be retained within, and alter the surface characteristics such as roughness to aid in camouflage. The dorsal scales of the forest cobra are smooth, glossy, and strongly oblique. The colour of this species is variable, with three main colour morphs. Those from the forest or forest fringe, from Sierra Leone east to western Kenya and south to Angola are glossy black, the chin, throat, and anterior region of the belly are cream or white, with broad black cross-bars and blotches. The sides of the head are strikingly marked with black and white, giving the impression of vertical black and white bars on the lips. The second colour morph, from the west African savanna, is banded black and yellow, with a black tail, the head is brownish-yellow on top, the lips, chin, and throat are yellow. The third colour morph, from the coastal plain of east Africa, south to KwaZulu-Natal, inland to Zambia and southern Democratic Republic of Congo, is brownish or blackish-brown above, paler below, the belly is yellow or cream, heavily speckled with brown or black, and specimens from the southern part of its range have black tails. Melanistic (all black) specimens have been documented from west Africa.

The head, body and tail scalation of the forest cobra:

- Dorsal rows at midbody: 19–21
- Ventrals: 201–214
- Subcaudals: 63-72 (paired)
- Anal plate: Single
- Upper labials: 7 (8)
- Upper labials touching eye: 3 & 4
- Preoculars: 1–2
- Postoculars: 2–3
- Lower labials: 8
- Temporals: variable

=== Venom ===
The venom of this cobra is a postsynaptic neurotoxin and bites result in severe neurotoxicity. Ernst and Zug (1996) list a value of 0.225 mg/kg SC. According to Brown (1973) and Fry of the Australian Venom and Toxin Database, the murine intraperitoneal LD_{50} value is 0.324 mg/kg. The venom yield per bite ranges drastically among sources; a maximal dose of 500 mg has been recorded while another venom yield project on two individuals obtained an average dose of 571 mg (dry venom) with a maximum of 1102 mg from 59 times of milking. Signs and symptoms of envenomation include ptosis, drowsiness, limb paralysis, hearing loss, inability to speak, dizziness, ataxia, shock, hypotension, abdominal pain, fever, pallor, and other neurological and respiratory symptoms.

The forest cobra is one of the least frequent causes of snake bite among the African cobras, largely due its forest-dwelling habits but a bite by this species should be taken very seriously because it ranks as the 4th most venomous Naja (true cobra) species. The symptomology is thought to be very similar to that of the Egyptian cobra (Naja haje). Clinical experience with this species has been very sparse, and few recorded bites have been documented. Deaths from respiratory failure due to severe neurotoxicity have been reported, but most victims will survive if prompt administration of antivenom is undertaken as soon as clinical signs of envenomation have been noted. Rare cases of spontaneous recoveries without the use of specific antivenom have also been seen; however, neglecting the use of antivenom places the patient at increased risk for major morbidity and mortality. If the snake becomes cornered or is agitated, it can quickly attack the aggressor, and because a large amount of venom is injected, a rapidly fatal outcome is possible. The mortality rate of an untreated bite is not exactly known but it is thought to be quite high. The forest cobra does not spit or spray its venom.

Two cases from Liberia experienced severe neurological symptoms, including ptosis, nausea, vomiting, tachycardia, and respiratory distress. A child in Ghana died within 20 minutes after being bitten by a snake suspected to be from this species.

== Distribution and habitat ==
The forest cobra occurs mainly in central Africa. It has been recorded from Benin, Nigeria, Equatorial Guinea, Cameroon, Gabon, the Republic of Congo, the Democratic Republic of Congo, Central African Republic, and northern Angola.

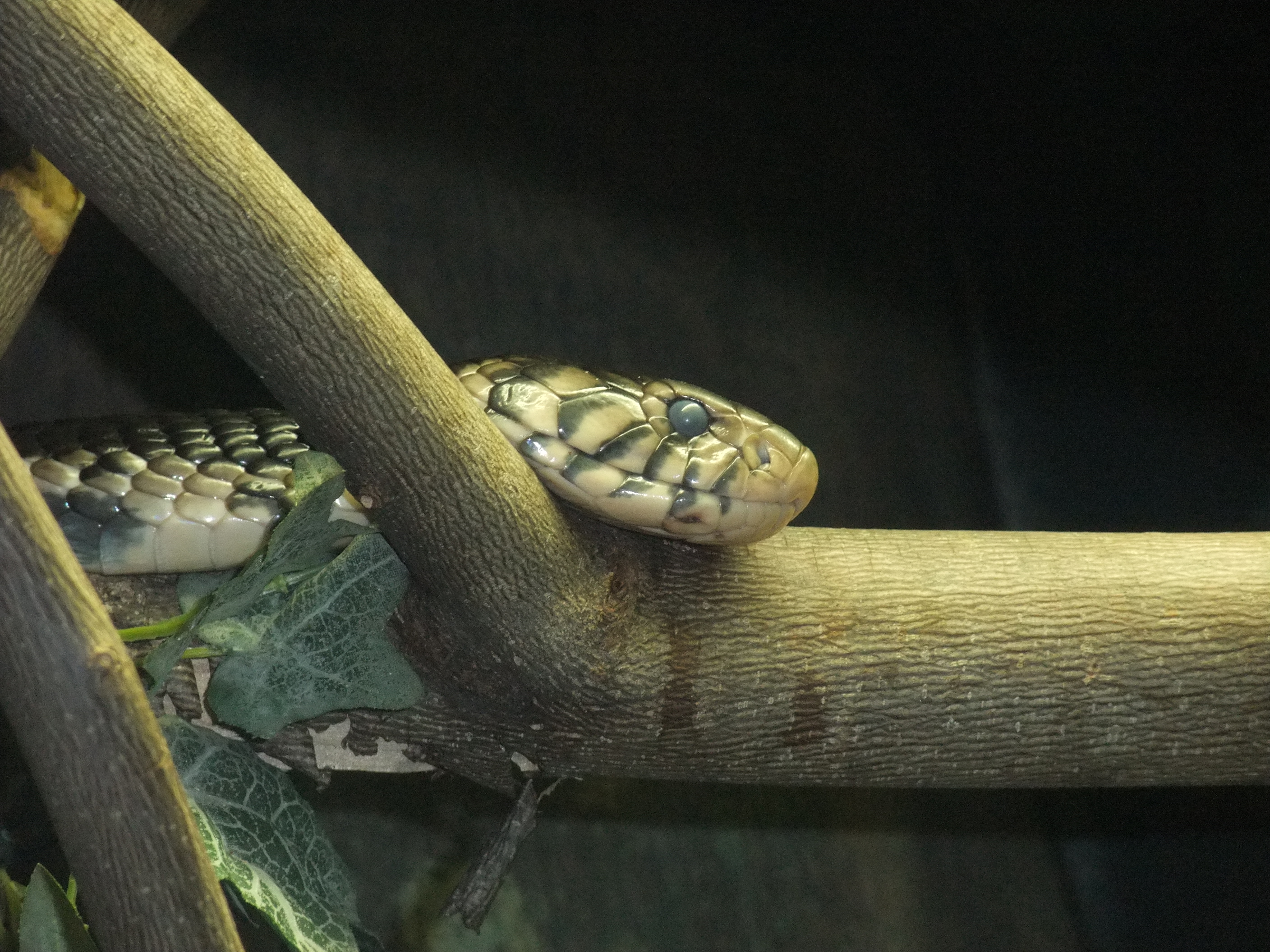

A snake of forest or woodland, it is the only one of Africa's cobras that will live in high forest. The forest cobras are snakes that are well adapted to many environments and the habitat of the forest cobra is strongly dependent on what part of its African range the snake originates from. Forest cobras originating in the southern African regions are typically found in savanna and grassland, but they can also be found in broken rock country. They are mainly found in the tropical and subtropical rainforest regions of west and central Africa. It also inhabits mangroves in western Africa. The banded form of forest cobra in west Africa lives in savanna and grassland (but usually along streams) and well-vegetated areas, especially riverine forest, up to latitude 14 N. The species' preferred habitat are lowland forest and moist savanna where it favors coastal thickets. This snake seems to be highly adaptable and will readily move into drier areas if it can. In western Kenya, the forest cobra has been found in wide stretched grassland areas. The population of forest cobras in Uganda are almost always found close to water. The brown colour phase occurs in coastal and high altitude forest, woodland and thicket, and grassland areas (i.e. Nyanga, Zimbabwe). Due to its secretive habits, and fondness for living in holes, it often persists in quite well-inhabited areas, common in and around many central African towns, even long after most vegetation has gone. They are also found on fruit plantations where they live in the trees. It occurs through a wide altitude range, from sea-level to forested mountains at 2,800 metres (9,200 feet) above sea level.

== Behavior ==
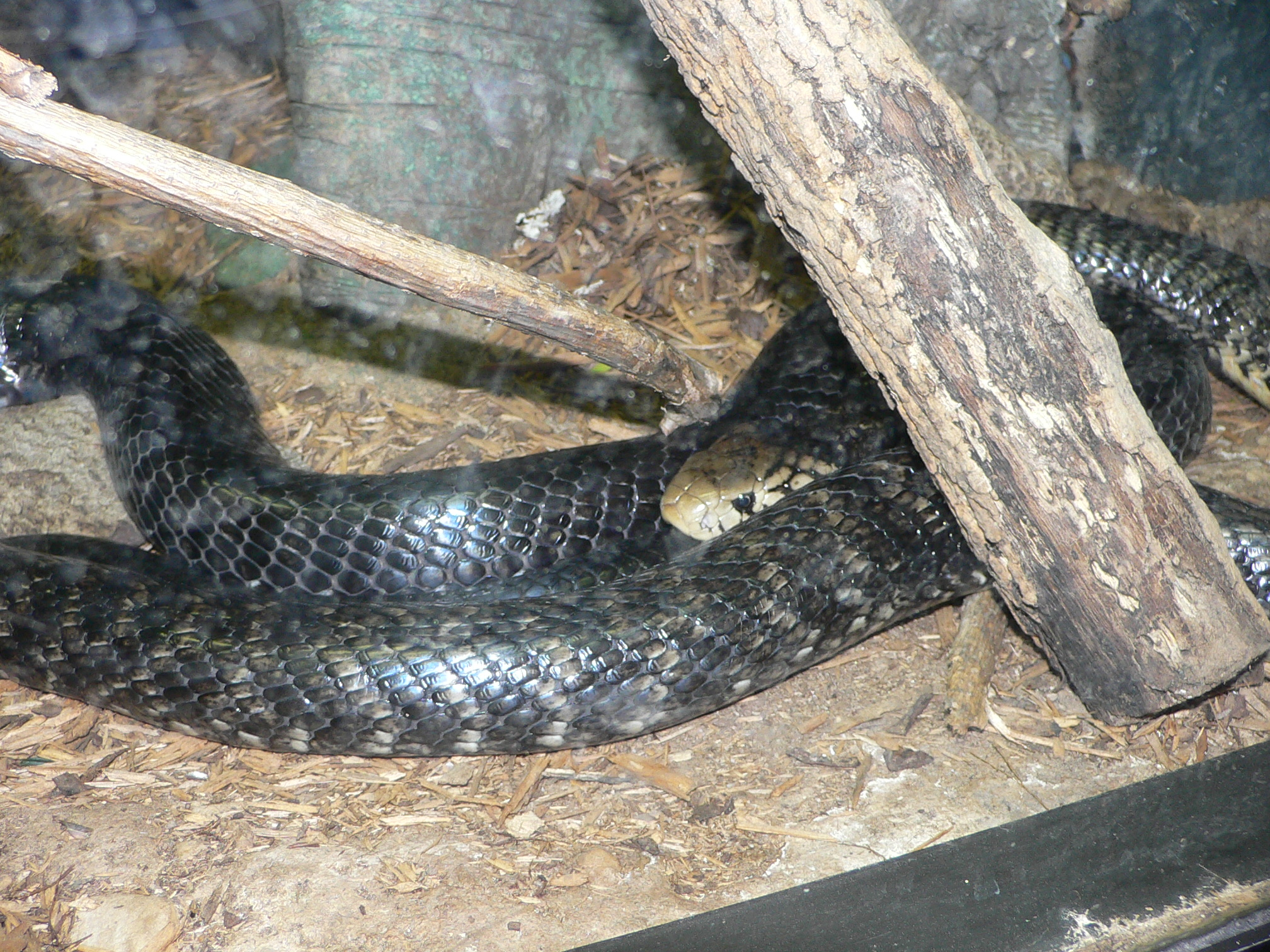

The forest cobra is an agile, diurnal species that climbs well and is one of the most aquatic of the true cobras of the genus Naja. It is terrestrial, but it is a fast, graceful climber, known to ascend trees to a height of 10 m (33 ft) or more. It is quick moving and alert. It swims well and readily takes to the water; in some areas its main diet is fish and could be regarded as semi-aquatic. Although it is active mostly during the day (diurnal) in uninhabited areas, it can also be active by night (nocturnal) where it goes into urban areas. When not active, it takes cover in holes, brush piles, hollow logs, among root clusters or in rock crevices, or in abandoned termite mounds at forest fringe or clearings. In certain areas, it hides along river banks, in overhanging root systems or bird holes, and in urban areas will hide in junk piles or unused buildings. When agitated, it rears up to a considerable height and spreads a long, narrow hood. It can strike quickly, to quite a long distance, and if molested and cornered, it will rush forward and make a determined effort to bite. It is an alert and agile species of cobra. Some authorities believe it is one of the most dangerous African snakes to be kept as many captive forest cobras are described to be particularly aggressive when handled. This species is not able to "spit" its venom.

=== Diet ===
Forest cobras will feed on a wide variety of prey, including amphibians, anuran tadpoles, fish, other snakes, monitor lizards and other lizards, birds and bird eggs, rodents, and other small mammals. It has been recorded as taking mudskippers, and in west Africa, one specimen had eaten an African giant shrew, an insectivore with a smell so noxious, most other snakes would not touch it.

=== Reproduction ===
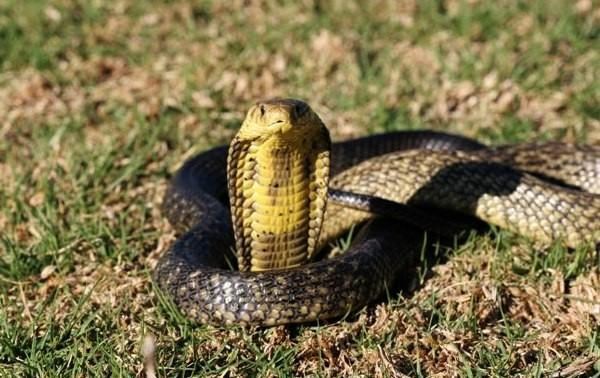
A young forest cobra

This is an oviparous species. In the summer, females will lay between 11 and 26 smooth white eggs, each roughly 3 to 6 cm (1.2 to 2.4 in). The eggs stick together in a bunch. The eggs are laid in hollow trees, termite mounds, holes in the ground or females will make their own nests. Before mating, a pair of will "dance", raising their heads a foot or more off the ground and moving to and fro. This may continue for an hour before mating takes place, when the male presses his cloaca (the chamber into which the reproductive, urinary, and intestinal canals empty) against that of the female. Female forest cobras may stand guard and are irritable and aggressive during the breeding period. A female is liable to attack without provocation, with potentially fatal consequences for passersby if her nest is near a footpath. Hatchlings are born completely independent and are usually 22 to 25 cm (8.7 to 9.8 in) in length, although some sources claim that hatchlings may measure up to 47 cm (19 in) Incubation period is anywhere from 55 to 70 days (or over 80 days in one captive study) at temperatures of 27–30 °C (81–86 °F). These snakes are known to have a long lifespan. One captive specimen lived for 28 years, which was the record for the longest lived venomous snake in captivity, but another specimen held at the Melbourne Zoo in Australia turned 35 on 1 September 2014.
