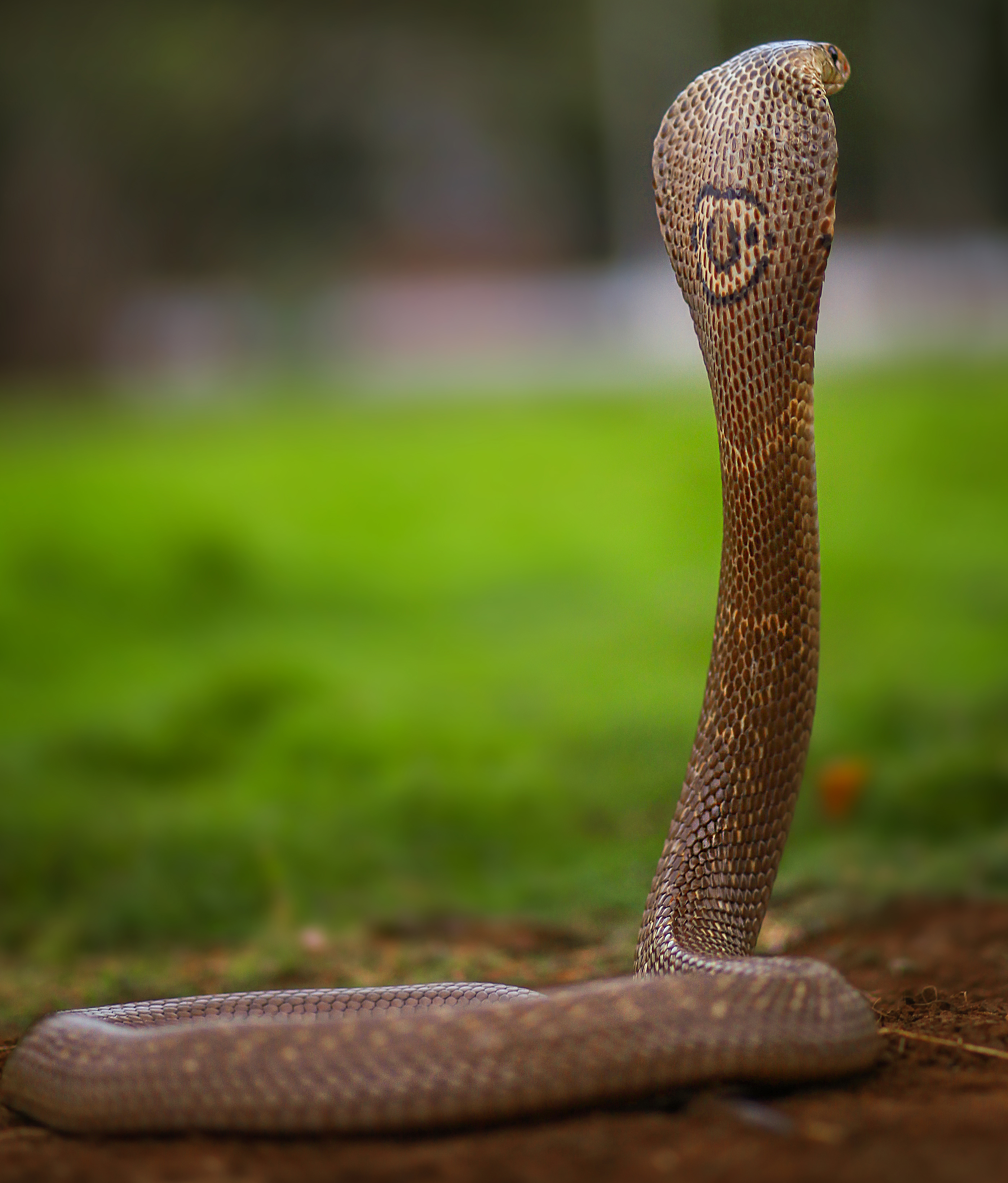
- Monocled cobra

Conservation status
- Least Concern (IUCN 3.1)
- CITES Appendix II

Scientific classification
- Kingdom: Animalia
- Phylum: Chordata
- Class: Reptilia
- Order: Squamata
- Suborder: Serpentes
- Family: Elapidae
- Genus: Naja
- Species: N. kaouthia

Binomial name
- Naja kaouthia Lesson, 1831
- Naja kaouthia distribution

= Monocled cobra =

Species of snake

without 'monocle'; in Vietnam

The monocled cobra (Naja kaouthia), also called monocellate cobra and Indian spitting cobra, is a venomous cobra species widespread across South and Southeast Asia. It is characterized by a distinctive circular or "monocle"-shaped marking on the hood, though the pattern can be highly variable or even absent in some individuals. It occupies a wide range of habitats, including forests, agricultural land, and areas near human settlements. It is responsible for a significant proportion of snakebite incidents and fatalities in its range, due to its potent neurotoxic venom and frequent proximity to human settlements. Some populations of the monocled cobra have the ability to spit venom with notable accuracy, though not all individuals exhibit this behavior.

== Taxonomy ==
The scientific name Naja kaouthia was proposed by René Lesson in 1831, when he described the monocled cobra as a beautiful snake that is distinct from the spectacled cobra, with 188 ventral scales and 53 pairs of caudal scales.

Since then, several monocled cobras were described under different scientific names:

- In 1834, John Edward Gray published Thomas Hardwicke's first illustration of a monocled cobra under the trinomial Naja tripudians var. fasciata.
- In 1839, Theodore Edward Cantor described a brownish monocled cobra with numerous faint yellow transverse stripes and a hood marked with a white ring under the binomial Naja larvata, found in Bombay, Calcutta, and Assam.

Several varieties of monocled cobras were described under the binomial Naja tripudians between 1895 and 1913:

- N. j. var. scopinucha 1895
- N. j. var. unicolor 1876
- N. j. var. viridis 1913
- N. j. var. sagittifera 1913

In 1940, Malcolm Arthur Smith classified the monocled cobra as a subspecies of the spectacled cobra under the trinomial Naja naja kaouthia. Reclassification in the 1990s further distinguished Naja kaouthia from Naja siamensis, a name commonly used in older toxinological research.

Phylogenetic studies of Naja kaouthia in Thailand have demonstrated surprising variation, with one population resulting in the species becoming paraphyletic with other Asiatic cobras.

== Description ==
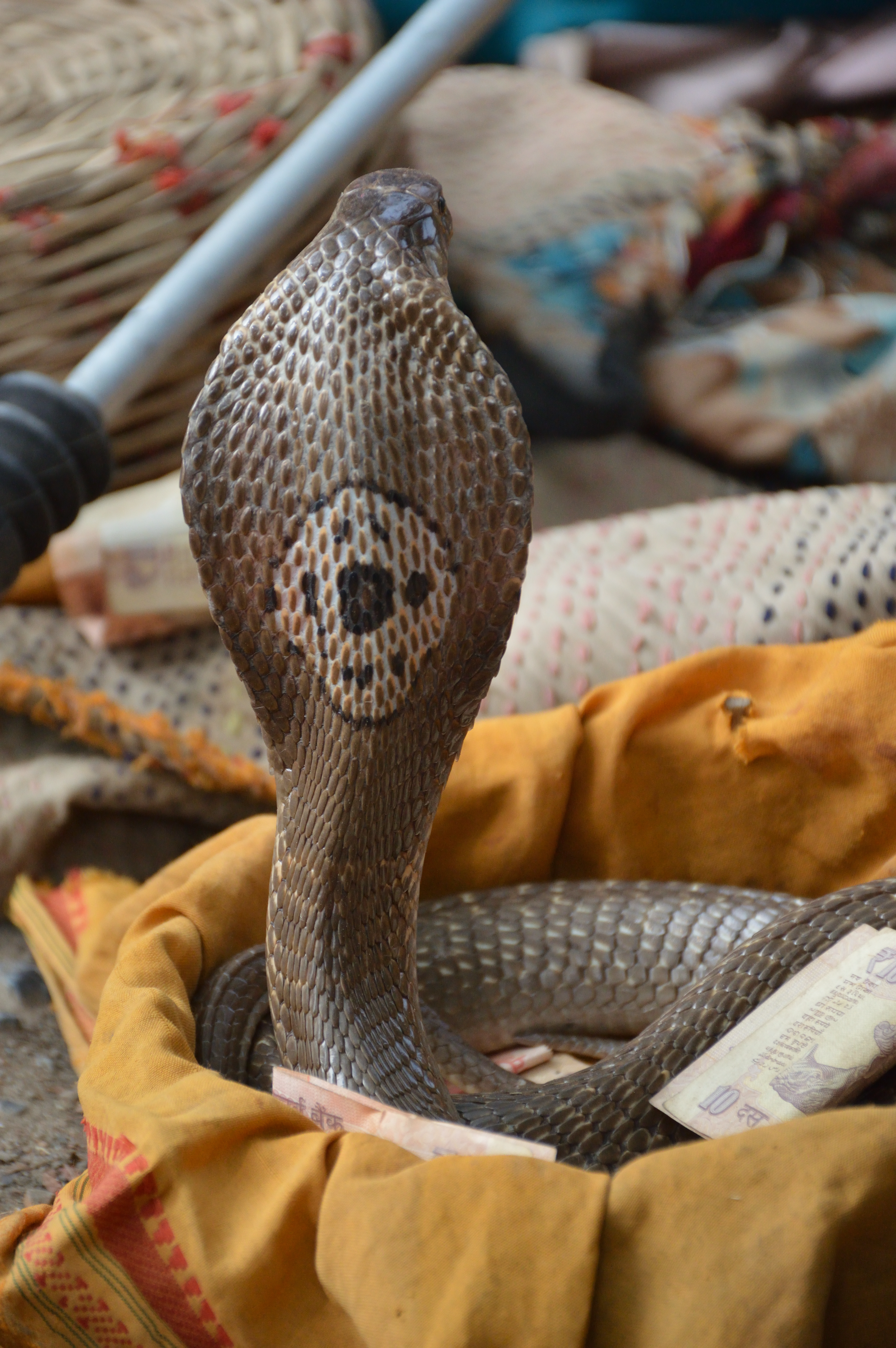
Characteristic monocle pattern on hood

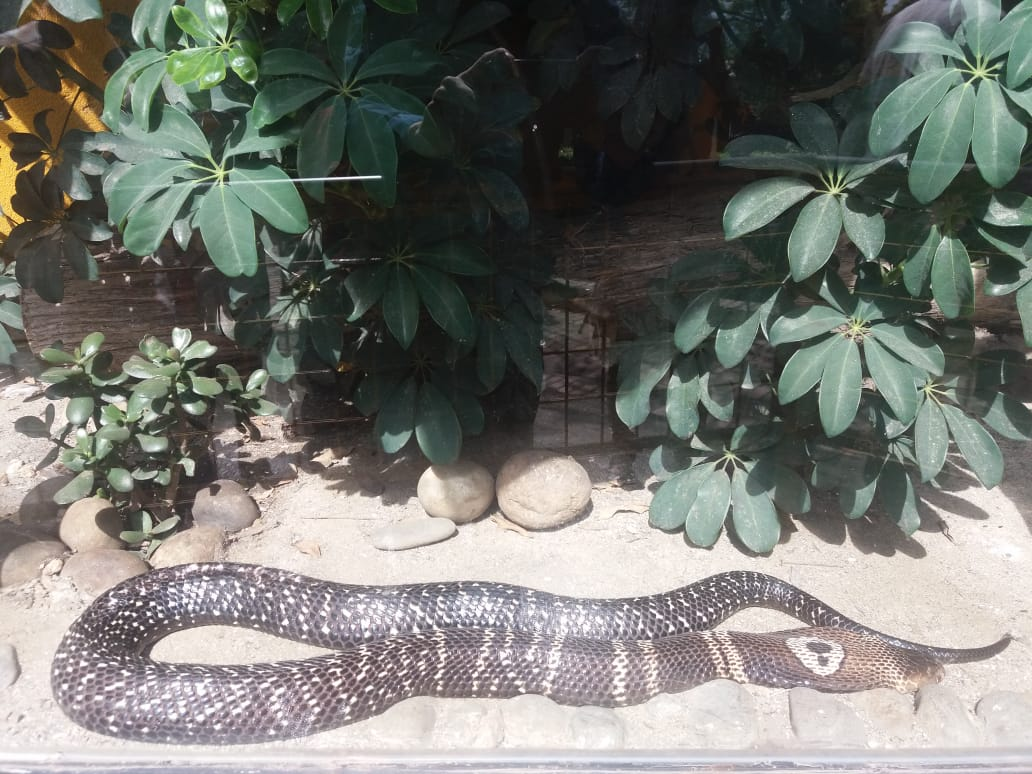
Monocled cobra with banded body

The monocled cobra has an O-shaped, or monocellate hood pattern, unlike that of the Indian cobra, which has the "spectacle" pattern (two circular ocelli connected by a curved line) on the rear of its hood. The elongated nuchal ribs enable a cobra to expand the anterior of the neck into a "hood". Coloration in the young is more constant. The dorsal surface may be yellow, brown, gray, or blackish, with or without ragged or clearly defined cross bands. It can be olivaceous or brownish to black above with or without a yellow or orange-colored, O-shaped mark on the hood. It has a black spot on the lower surface of the hood on either side, and one or two black cross-bars on the belly behind it. The rest of the belly is usually the same color as the back, but paler. As age advances, the snake becomes paler, wherein the adult is brownish or olivaceous. A pair of fixed anterior fangs is present. The largest fang recorded measured 6.78 mm (0.678 cm). Fangs are moderately adapted for spitting.

Adult monocled cobras reach a length of 1.35 to 1.5 m (4.4 to 4.9 ft) with a tail length of 23 cm (9.1 in). Many larger specimens have been recorded, but they are rare. Adults can reach a maximum of 2.3 m (7.5 ft) in length.

=== Scalation ===
The monocled cobra has 25 to 31 scales on the neck, 19 to 21 on the body, and 17 or 15 on the front of the vent. It has 164 to 197 ventral scales and 43 to 58 subcaudal scales. It typically has more than one cuneate scale on each side. The shape of the frontal scale is short and square. Ventrals in males range from 170 to 192, in females from 178 to 197. Subcaudals in males range from 48 to 61, in females from 46 to 59.

== Distribution and habitat ==
The monocled cobra is distributed from India in the west through to China, Vietnam and Cambodia. It also occurs on the Malay Peninsula and is native to West Bengal, Bangladesh, Bhutan, Myanmar, Laos, Nepal, and Thailand. It can adapt to a range of habitats, from natural to anthropogenically impacted environments. It prefer habitats associated with water, such as paddy fields, swamps and mangroves, but lives also in grasslands, shrublands, forests, agricultural land at elevations of up to 1,000 m (3,280 ft) and human settlements including cities.

== Behaviour and ecology ==
The monocled cobra is terrestrial and most active at dusk. In rice-growing areas, it hides in rodent burrows in the dykes between fields and has become semi-aquatic in this type of habitat. Juveniles feed mostly on amphibians whereas adults prey on small mammals, snakes and fish. When disturbed it prefers to escape. However, when threatened it will raise the anterior portions of the body, spread its hood, usually hisses loudly and strikes in an attempt to bite and defend itself. It often hides in tree holes and areas where rodents are plentiful.

Some monocled cobra populations have the ability to spray venom, earning them the name "Indian spitting cobra".

== Reproduction ==
This is an oviparous species. Females lay 16 to 33 eggs per clutch. Incubation periods range from 55 to 73 days. Egg-laying takes place January through March. The females usually stay with the eggs. Some collaboration between males and females has been reported in Naja naja x Naja kaouthia - hybrids.

== Conservation status ==
The monocled cobra is listed on CITES Appendix II and has been assessed as Least Concern on the IUCN Red List due to its large distribution, tolerance of a broad range of habitats including anthropogenically altered environments, and its reported abundance. No major threats have been reported, and it is not thought to be undergoing a significant population decline. Monocled cobras are harvested for the wildlife trade, however, collection from the wild is minimal and not likely to cause significant population declines.

== Venom ==
The venom of the monocled cobra from three different localities was reported to exhibit different intravenous and subcutaneous median lethal doses: Thailand, 0.18-0.22 μg/g; Malaysia, 0.90-1.11 μg/g; and Vietnam, 0.90-1.00 μg/g, of mouse body weight. These results reflect the distinct difference in the lethal potency of the monocled cobra and response to antivenom neutralization. The major toxic components in cobra venoms are postsynaptic neurotoxins, which block the nerve transmission by binding specifically to the nicotinic acetylcholine receptor, leading to flaccid paralysis and even death by respiratory failure. The major α-neurotoxin in the monocled cobra's venom is a long neurotoxin, α-cobratoxin; the minor α-neurotoxin is different from cobrotoxin in one residue. The neurotoxins of this particular species are weak. The venom of this species also contains myotoxins and cardiotoxins. Envenomation usually presents predominantly with extensive local necrosis and systemic manifestations to a lesser degree. Drowsiness, neurological and neuromuscular symptoms will usually manifest earliest; hypotension, flushing of the face, warm skin, and pain around bite site typically manifest within one to four hours following the bite; paralysis, ventilatory failure or death could ensue rapidly, possibly as early as 60 minutes in very severe cases of envenomation. However, the presence of fang marks does not always imply that envenomation actually occurred.

In case of intravenous injection the LD_{50} tested in mice is 0.373 mg/kg, and 0.225 mg/kg in case of intraperitoneal injection. The average venom yield per bite is approximately 263 mg dry weight.

Between 1968 and 1974, 20 cases of cobra bites were observed in Thailand; all the patients developed systemic envenoming and received treatment, but 19 patients survived. The monocled cobra is responsible for the greatest number of snakebite fatalities in Thailand.

== See also ==
- Snakebite
