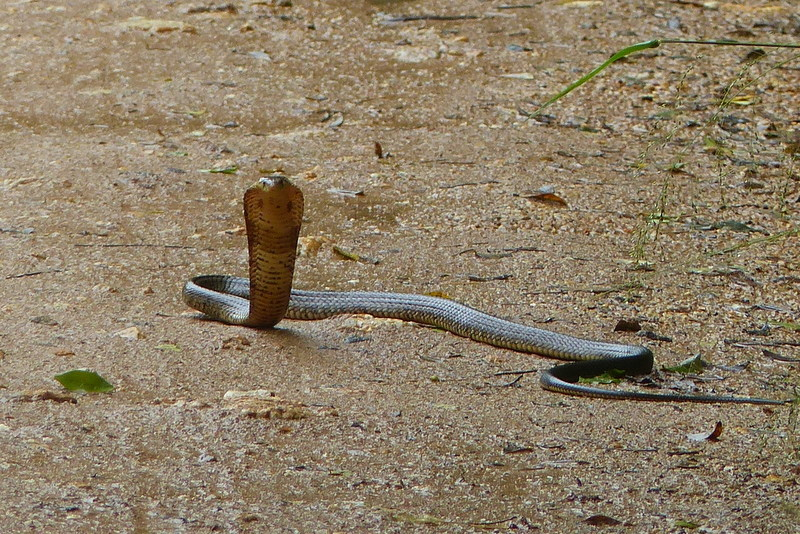

Conservation status
- Least Concern (IUCN 3.1)

Scientific classification
- Kingdom: Animalia
- Phylum: Chordata
- Class: Reptilia
- Order: Squamata
- Suborder: Serpentes
- Family: Elapidae
- Genus: Naja
- Subgenus: Boulengerina
- Species: N. subfulva

Binomial name
- Naja subfulva (Laurent, 1955)

= Brown forest cobra =

Species of snake

The brown forest cobra (Naja subfulva) is a species of cobra in the genus Naja that is found in Central and East Africa.

This species was long thought to be either identical to the forest cobra (Naja melanoleuca), or a subspecies thereof, but morphological and genetic differences have led to its recognition as a separate species. It differs from Naja melanoleuca and other forest cobras in usually having a brownish forebody, often with darker spots, and often a light ventral side and attenuated ventral banding.

== Description ==
Adults of most populations have a brown forebody, gradually turning black towards the tail, often with spotting or mottling in the lighter parts. Adults from the Lake Victoria area and parts of the Congo Basin are entirely black dorsally. The sides and underside of the head are light, usually cream-coloured, and the labial scales have dark edges, although these can be indistinct in some populations. Ventral side may turn black posteriorly, or be light throughout. Dorsals at midbody in 17 scale rows along the East African coast, 19 elsewhere. Ventrals 197–228, subcaudals 57–70. Maximum recorded length 269 cm.

== Distribution ==
East and Central Africa, in forests, thickets, and mostly wooded environments in savannas: recorded from South Africa, Mozambique, Zimbabwe, Zambia, Malawi, Angola, Tanzania, Kenya, Uganda, Rwanda, Burundi, Ethiopia, Somalia, South Sudan, Democratic Republic of Congo, Republic of Congo, Central African Republic, Cameroon, Chad and probably Nigeria.

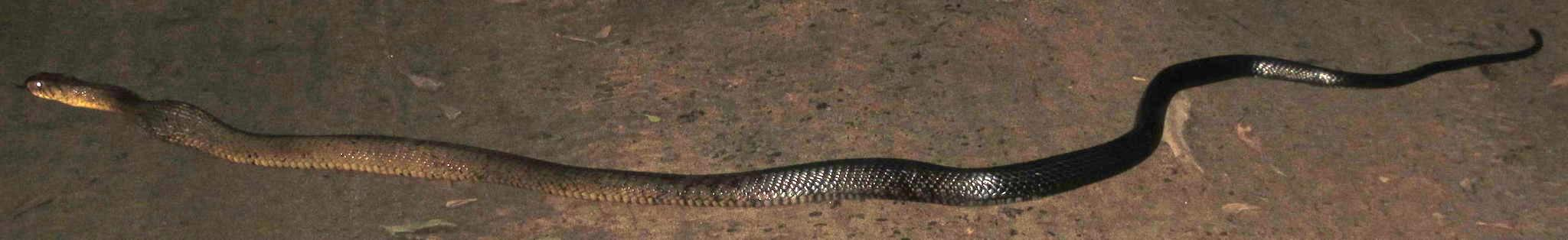
N. subflava at Mtunzini, South Africa
