= Black-necked spitting cobra =

- A reddish-brown Black-necked spitting cobra in Tanzania

Conservation status
- Least Concern (IUCN 3.1)

Scientific classification
- Kingdom: Animalia
- Phylum: Chordata
- Class: Reptilia
- Order: Squamata
- Suborder: Serpentes
- Family: Elapidae
- Genus: Naja
- Subgenus: Afronaja
- Species: N. nigricollis

Binomial name
- Naja nigricollis Hallowell, 1857
- The approximate range of Naja nigricollis in Africa

Synonyms
- Naja nigricollis atriceps Laurent, 1955; Naja nigricollis occidentalis Laurent, 1973; Naja crawshayi Broadley & Cotterill, 2004

Spitting cobra found mostly in sub-Saharan Africa

The black-necked spitting cobra (Naja nigricollis) is a species of spitting cobra found mostly in sub-Saharan Africa. They are moderately sized snakes that can grow to a length of 1.2 to 2.2 m (3.9 to 7.2 ft) in length. Their coloration and markings can vary considerably. They prey primarily on small rodents. They possess medically significant venom, although the mortality rate for untreated bites on humans is relatively low (~ 5–10%, in endemic regions under 1%). Like other spitting cobras, they can eject venom from their fangs when threatened (one drop over 7 metres (23 ft) and more in perfect accuracy). The cytotoxic venom irritates the skin, causing blisters and inflammation, and can cause permanent blindness if the venom makes contact with the eyes and is not washed off.

Naja nigricollis belongs to the cobra genus Naja under the family Elapidae. It previously included two subspecies that have been moved to the species Naja nigricincta – the zebra spitting cobra (Naja nigricincta nigricincta) and the black spitting cobra (Naja nigricincta woodi).

== Taxonomy ==
Naja nigricollis is classified under the genus Naja of the family Elapidae. It was first described by Norwegian zoologist Johan Reinhardt in 1843. The generic name Naja is a Latinisation of the Sanskrit word nāgá (नाग), meaning "cobra". The specific epithet nigricollis is Latin for "black-necked": niger, meaning "black", and collis, meaning "neck".

Naja nigricollis previously included two subspecies – Naja nigricollis nigricincta and Naja nigricollis woodi. But genetic studies in 2007 by Wolfgang Wüster et al. have concluded that these subspecies should be treated under a separate species, Naja nigricincta.

== Description ==
N. nigricollis is a moderately sized, venomous snake with a moderately distinct head; the shape of the head is due primarily to two large venom glands found on each side of the head. Its colour can vary depending on region of origin. Some specimens are black or pale grey with a yellow or reddish ventral side with a broad, black neck band, often with an orange or pinkish bar on the neck. Other specimens can be yellowish-brown or have a yellow copper colour and are missing the bandings around the neck and the reddish colour on the belly. Some other specimens are deep reddish-brown, and yet others are an olive brown. Some can even be striped black and white or totally white (with dark eyes). There are 21–23 dorsal scales at the mid-body, 182–196 ventral scales, and 54–66 subcaudal scales. This species generally grows to a length of 1.2 metres (3.9 ft) to 2.2 metres (7.2 ft). These sizes are subject to trends based on geographic location and subspecies.

Black in Ghana

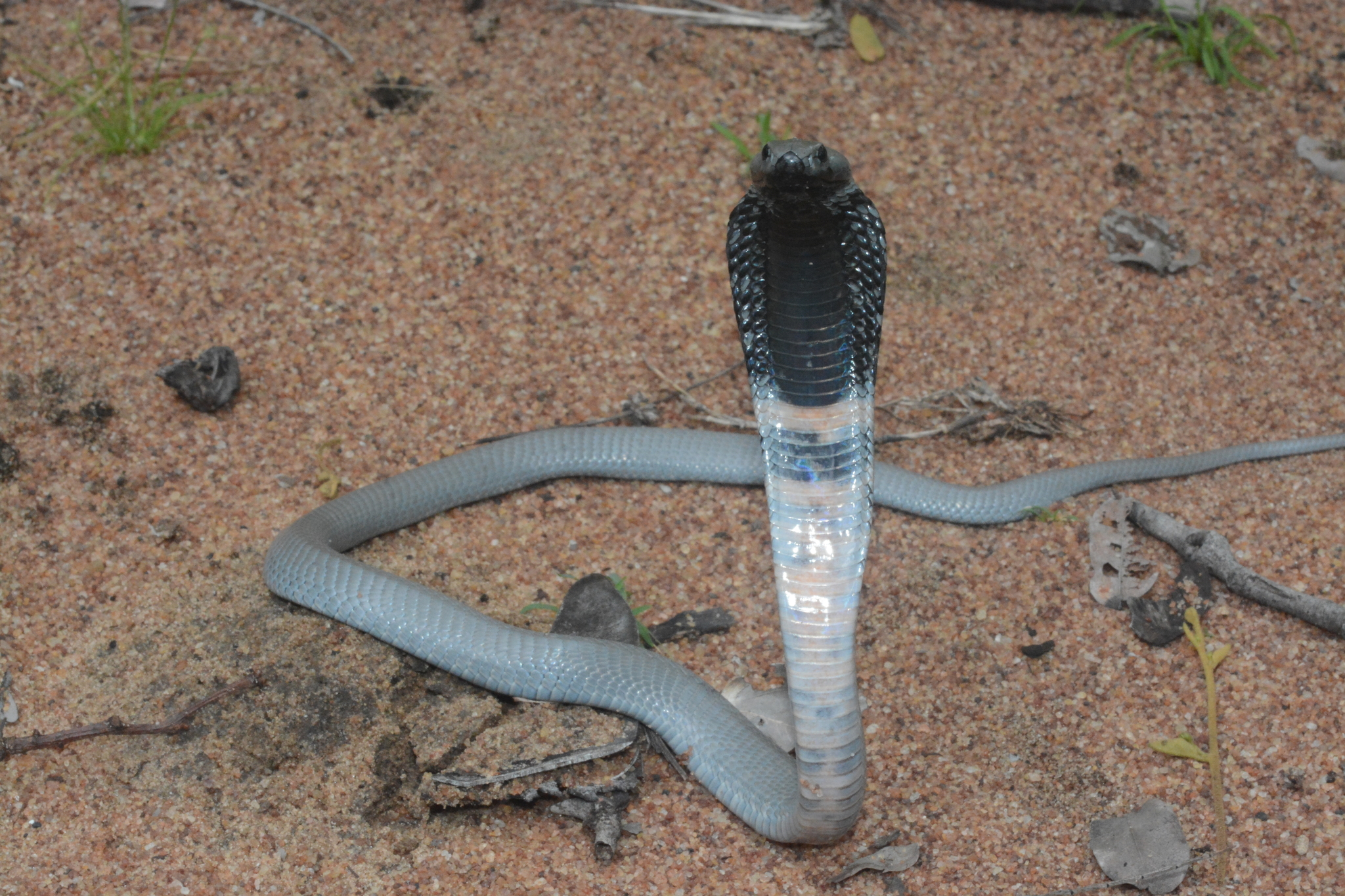
Pale grey in Tanzania

== Distribution and habitat ==
In Serengeti National Park

The species is very common and is widespread through much of sub-Saharan Africa and is found in western, eastern, central, and parts of southern Africa. It is absent from the rainforests of the Congo Basin. It has been recorded from Angola, Benin, Burkina Faso, Cameroon, Central African Republic, Chad, Democratic Republic of the Congo (except in the center), Congo, Ethiopia, Gabon, Ghana, Guinea Bissau, Guinea, Ivory Coast, Kenya, Liberia, Mali, Niger, Nigeria, Senegal, Sierra Leone, Gambia, Mauritania, Sudan, Tanzania, Somalia, Togo, Uganda, Zambia. Older records from South Africa, Botswana, Zimbabwe, Eswatini, Mozambique, or most of Namibia refer to Naja mossambica or Naja nigricincta, which were formerly regarded as subspecies of N. nigricollis.

N. nigricollis usually inhabits savanna and semi-desert regions of Africa. However, they can be found at altitudes up to 1,800 metres (5,900 ft), as well as in tropical and subtropical regions of central Africa in moist savanna and cleared former forest regions, particularly near rivers and streams. Adaptable snakes, Naja n. nigricollis occurs in southeastern Nigeria where their habitat has been transformed from rainforest to man-made farmlands, plantations, suburban areas, and a few fragmented forests. This species of cobra has found advantages in the drastic changes which have taken place in Nigeria's rainforests. A study by herpetologist Luca Luiselli suggests this snake now forages in much drier microhabitats.

The range of Naja nigricollis is currently expanding from the southeastern regions of Nigeria to the more desert and arid conditions in the central part of the nation. They also live in coastal scrubs and dry grasslands. Like other cobra species, they may find abandoned termite mounds or rodent holes to hide or cool off. However, tree trunks seem to be their favourite hiding places. They are excellent tree climbers, thus can be arboreal at times. Because they are so common across Africa, they are encountered in villages or small towns where they may come in direct contact with people.

== Behavior ==
Unlike other snakes, Naja nigricollis can be either nocturnal or diurnal depending on the time of year, geographic location, and average daytime temperature. This adaptability allows the snake to better regulate its body temperature and to gain access to the most abundant food sources of a particular area. It feeds primarily on small rodents, such as small rats and mice, birds, and fishes, but will also eat lizards, eggs, and other snakes.

Like other snakes, it may fall prey to raptors, especially different species of snake eagles that migrate to Africa when it is winter in the Northern Hemisphere. The short-toed snake eagle (Circaetus gallicus) may be a particular threat, as it is almost strictly an ophiophagus raptor. Other snakes also prey on this species.

Like other spitting cobras, this species is known for its ability to project venom at a potential threat. The venom is an irritant to the skin and eyes. If it enters the eyes, symptoms include extreme burning pain, loss of coordination, partial loss of vision, and permanent blindness. N. nigricollis is known for its tendency to liberally spit venom and bite with only the slightest provocation.

This species is sometimes found in captivity, and wild-caught individuals are generally nervous and prone to spitting. Captive-bred animals tend to be much more docile and calm when compared to their wild-caught counterparts.

== Reproduction ==
Like other cobra species, this snake is oviparous. The mating season of this species can vary from the end of winter (September) to the beginning of summer (December). Usually, the mating season is the same whether in captivity or in the wild. Females will commonly lay 10 to 15 eggs but can lay anywhere between eight and 22 eggs at a time. The gestation period lasts about 90–100 days, but once the eggs are laid, they hatch in 60–70 days, and need to be in a temperature of 28–30 °C (82–86 °F). At birth, the young are about 20 to 25 centimeters (7.9 to 9.8 in) in length and are completely independent.

== Venom ==
The venom of Naja nigricollis is somewhat unusual among elapids in that it consists primarily of cytotoxins, but with other components also. It retains the typical elapid neurotoxic properties while combining these with highly potent cytotoxins (necrotic agents) and cardiotoxins. Bite symptoms include severe external hemorrhaging and tissue necrosis around the bite area and difficulty breathing. Although the mortality rate in untreated cases is low (~ 5–10%), when death occurs, it is usually due to asphyxiation by paralysis of the diaphragm. The LD_{50} of Naja nigricollis is 2 mg/kg SC and 1.15 mg/kg IV. The average venom yield per bite of this species is 200 to 350 mg (dry weight) according to Minton (1974).

== Snake venom ophthalmia ==
In 1944, English ophthalmic surgeon Major Harold Ridley, published a short paper in the British Journal of Ophthalmology on spitting snakes and an account of the composition and action of snake venom in general. From his experiences in wartime Ghana, Ridley described snake venom ophthalmia in a 30-year-old labourer, who was cutting grass when a Black-necked cobra spat venom toward the man's right eye from a four- or five-feet distance. Ridley treated the man and followed his case until the eye had fully recovered – after about a week. In conclusion, after discussion on the therapeutic uses of snake venom, he conjectured that the diluted venom or a constituent of it might be used as a powerful anaesthetic in some cases of ophthalmic surgery.
