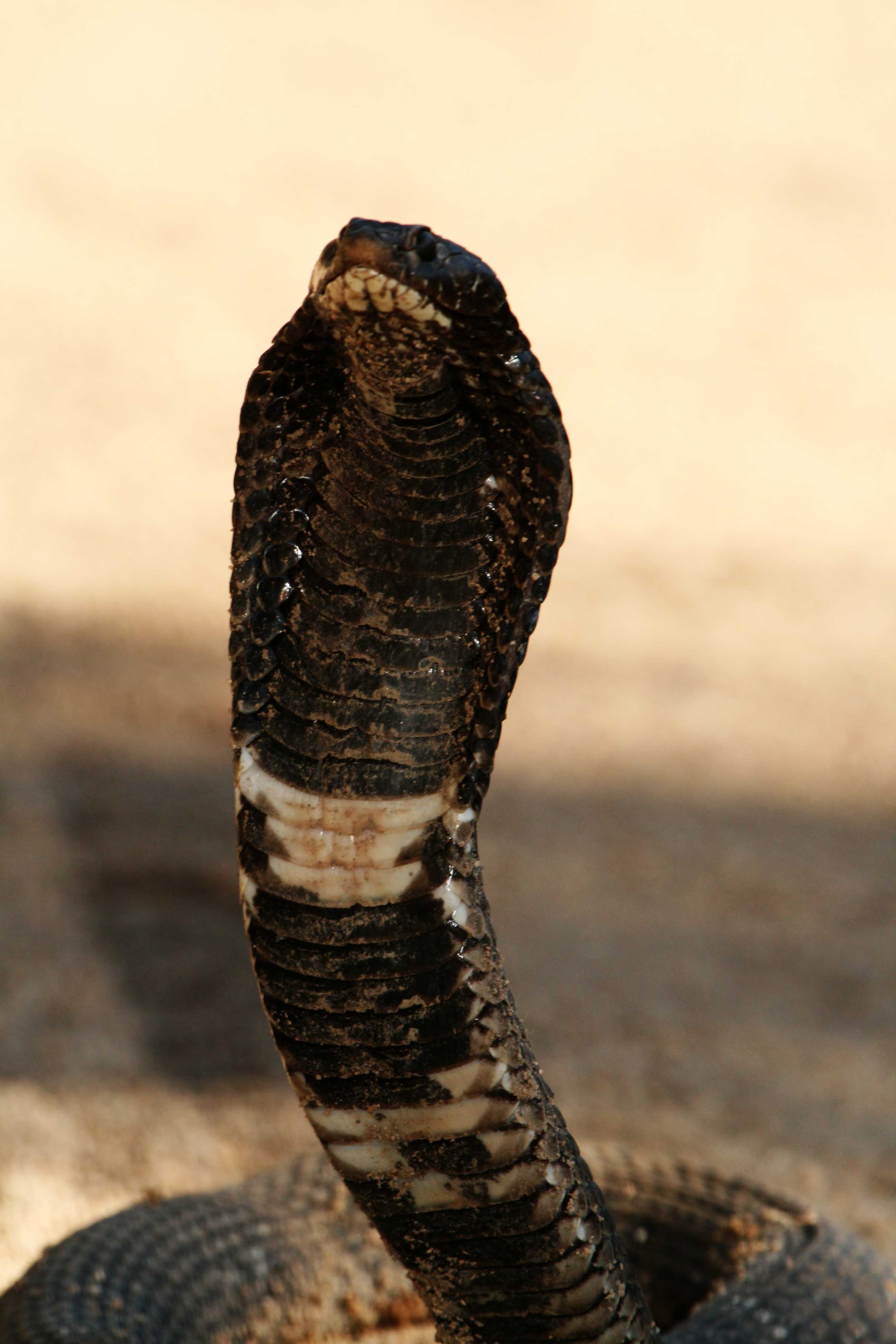

Conservation status
- Least Concern (IUCN 3.1)

Scientific classification
- Kingdom: Animalia
- Phylum: Chordata
- Class: Reptilia
- Order: Squamata
- Suborder: Serpentes
- Family: Elapidae
- Genus: Hemachatus; Fleming, 1822
- Species: H. haemachatus

Binomial name
- Hemachatus haemachatus (Bonnaterre, 1790)
- Extant (resident) Possibly extinct Presence Uncertain & Origin Uncertain

Synonyms
- Coluber haemachates Bonnaterre, 1790; Vipera haemachates — Latreille, 1802; Sepedon haemachates — Merrem, 1820; Naja haemachates — Schlegel, 1837; Aspidelaps haemachates — Jan, 1863; Sepedon hæmachates — Boulenger, 1896; Hemachatus haemachatus — Stejneger, 1936

= Rinkhals =

Monotypic cobra-like species of African elapid

The rinkhals (/ˈrɪŋk(h)æls/; Hemachatus haemachatus), also known as the ringhals /ˈrɪŋhæls/ or ring-necked spitting cobra, is a species of venomous snake in the family Elapidae. The species is found in parts of southern Africa. It is not a true cobra in that it does not belong to the genus Naja, but instead belongs to the monotypic genus Hemachatus. While rinkhals bear a great resemblance to true cobras, they also possess some remarkable differences from these, resulting in their placement outside the genus Naja. In 2023, the Zimbabwe population was described as a new species, H. nyangensis.

== Description ==
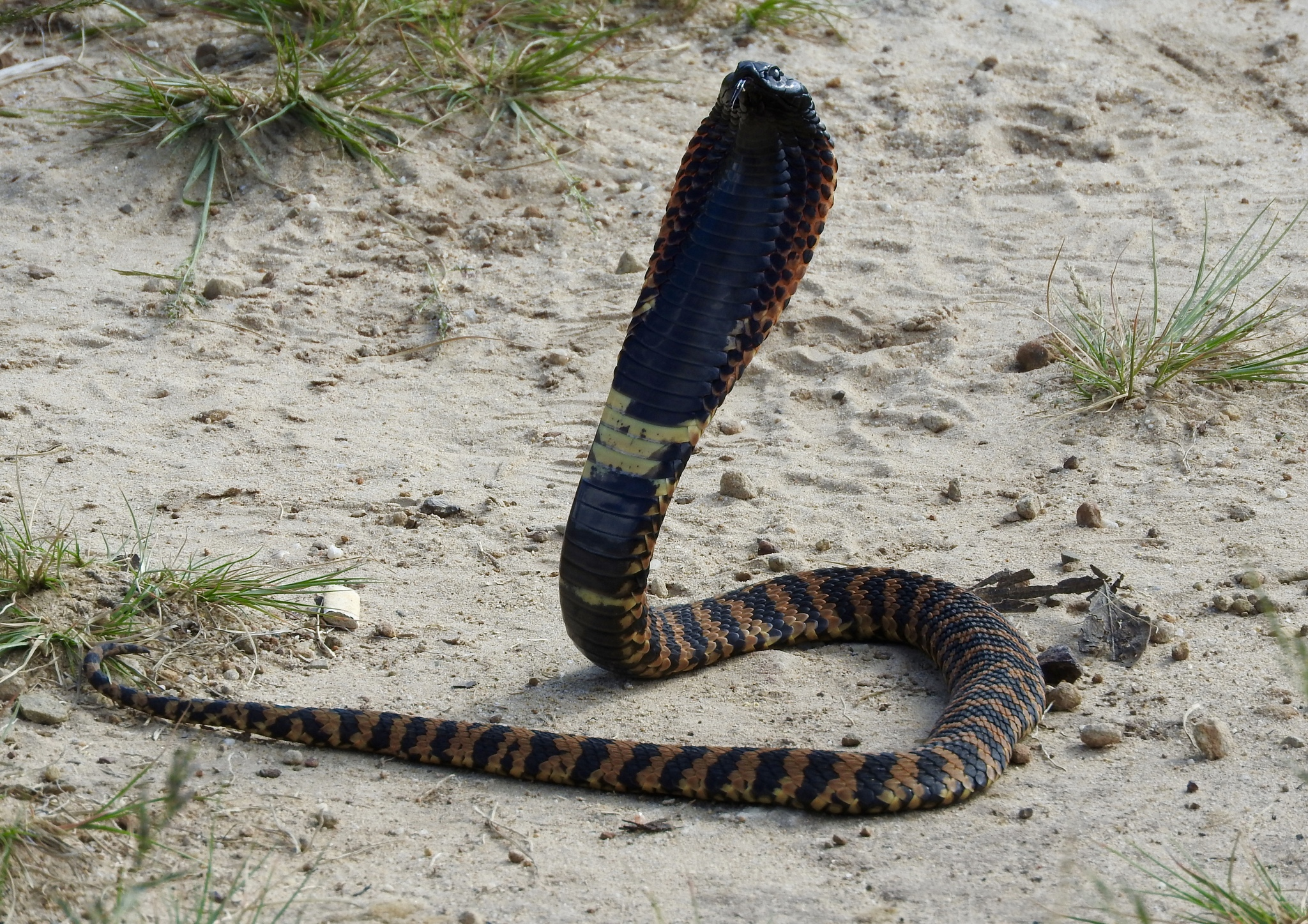
Rinkhals in uKhahlamba-Drakensberg Park.

Colouration of the rinkhals varies throughout its distribution area, but a characteristic of the species is that the belly is dark with one or two light-coloured crossbands on the throat. Its usual total length (tail included) is 90–110 cm (35–43 in). Some individuals may have a mostly black body, while others are striped. The dorsal scales are distinct from those of Naja cobras in that they are keeled. Also unlike members of the genus Naja, the rinkhals lacks solid teeth on the maxilla.

=== Scale pattern ===
The rinkhals has 17–19 rows of dorsal scales at its midbody, and has 116–150 ventral scales located on its belly. The rinkhals has only one Anal scale, and has 30–47 subcaudal scales. On its head, the rinkhals has 7 paired upper labial scales, with upper labials 3 and 4 entering the eye. The rinkhals also has 1 preocular (rarely up to 3) and 3 postocular scales. Finally, the rinkhals has 8–9 lower labial scales.

== Geographic range and habitat ==
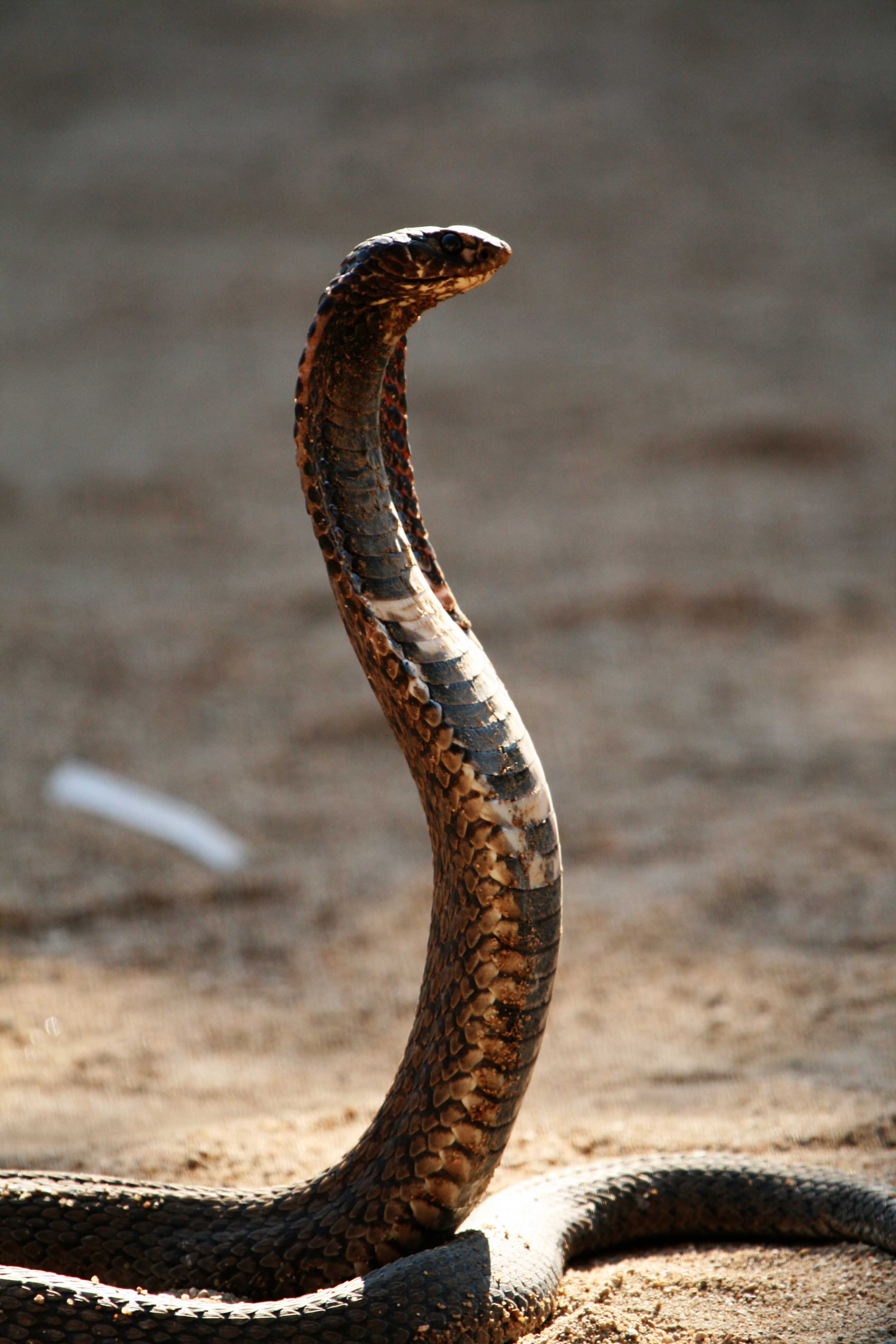
A South African rinkhals with hood spread

Hemachatus haemachatus is found in the Western and Eastern Cape provinces of South Africa, northeast through the Free State, Lesotho, KwaZulu-Natal, South Africa, Western Eswatini, Mpumalanga and parts of Gauteng, South Africa. An isolated population is centered on Inyanga on the Zimbabwe-Mozambique border. There are no recent records from this population; so scientists assume this population may be extinct.

The rinkhals generally prefers grassland habitats ranging from the coast to altitudes of up to 2,000 m (6,600 ft). The rinkhals is extremely common on the Highveld and in the grasslands of KwaZulu-Natal. Since the rinkhals has a natural propensity to eat frogs and toads, it can often be found near wetlands in its range.

== Behaviour and diet ==
The rinkhals is diurnal, and hunts during the daytime hours. The rinkhals has a varied diet, and will prey upon any vertebrate that is small enough for it to eat. The rinkhals most commonly eats toads in the wild, but it has also been recorded to consume rodents and other small vertebrates such as lizards.

When distressed the rinkhals will spread its hood, showing its distinctive striped neck. As a defense mechanism, the rinkhals will spit venom. It will normally spit from a reared position, lunging and hissing while doing so. The rinkhals has ample control over its venom glands, and can accurately spit venom at ranges up to 3 m (9.8 ft). The rinkhals is also known to engage in thanatosis, which is behaviour seen in other snakes such as those of the genus Heterodon. A rinkhals engaging in thanatosis will roll over onto its back, open its mouth, and stick out its tongue.

If all other methods of defense fail, the rinkhals will bite to ward off predators. Since it relies on other forms of defense, bites are usually very rare. Bites most often occur when people try to handle the snake.

== Reproduction ==
Unlike members of the genus Naja, the rinkhals is ovoviviparous. Instead of laying eggs, the rinkhals gives birth to live young. The Rinkhals produces litters of around twenty to thirty live young, but some females can give birth to over sixty live young. The rinkhals usually gives birth in the late summer, which in the southern hemisphere corresponds to the months ranging from December to March.

== Venom ==
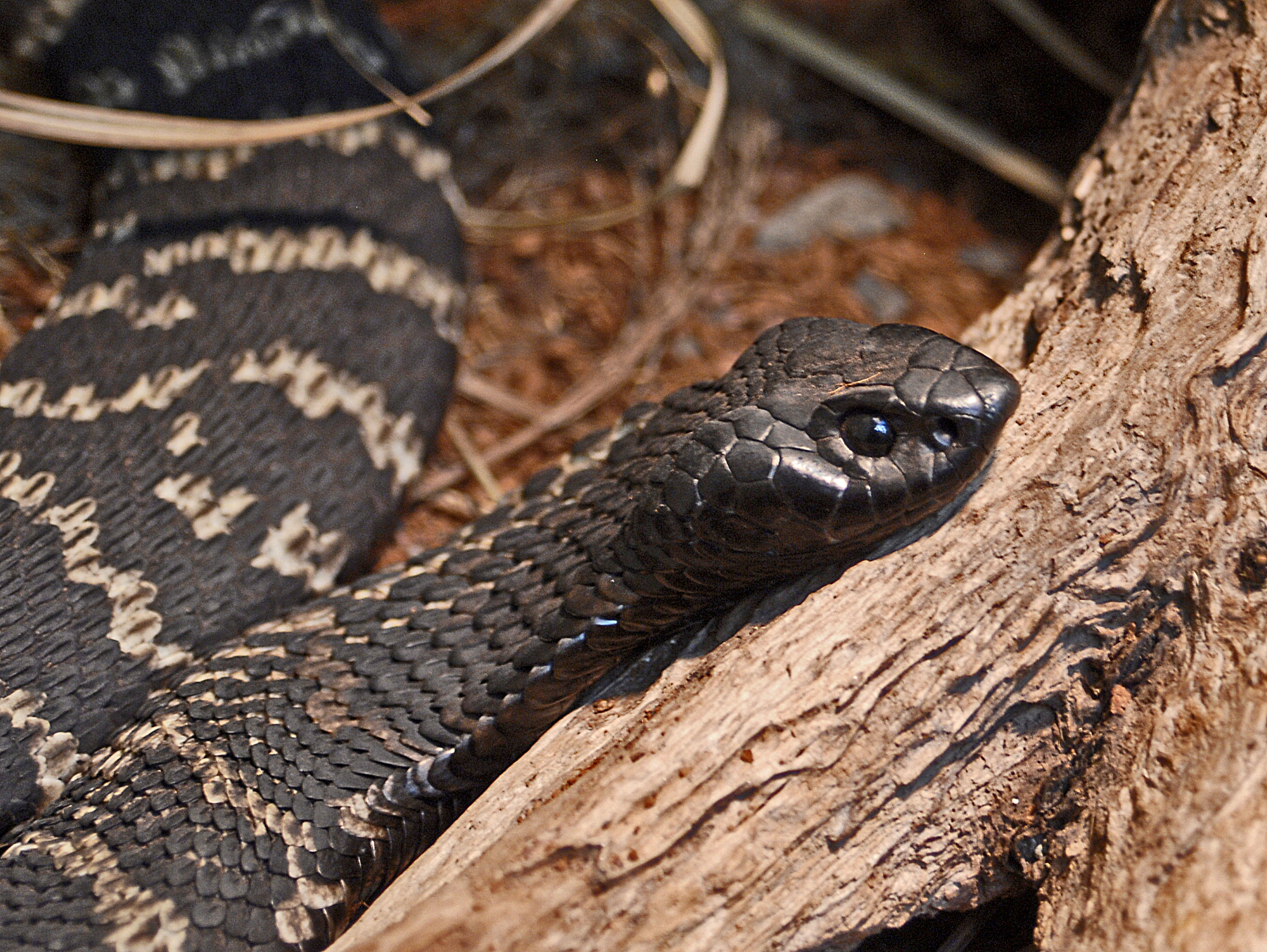
Detail of head

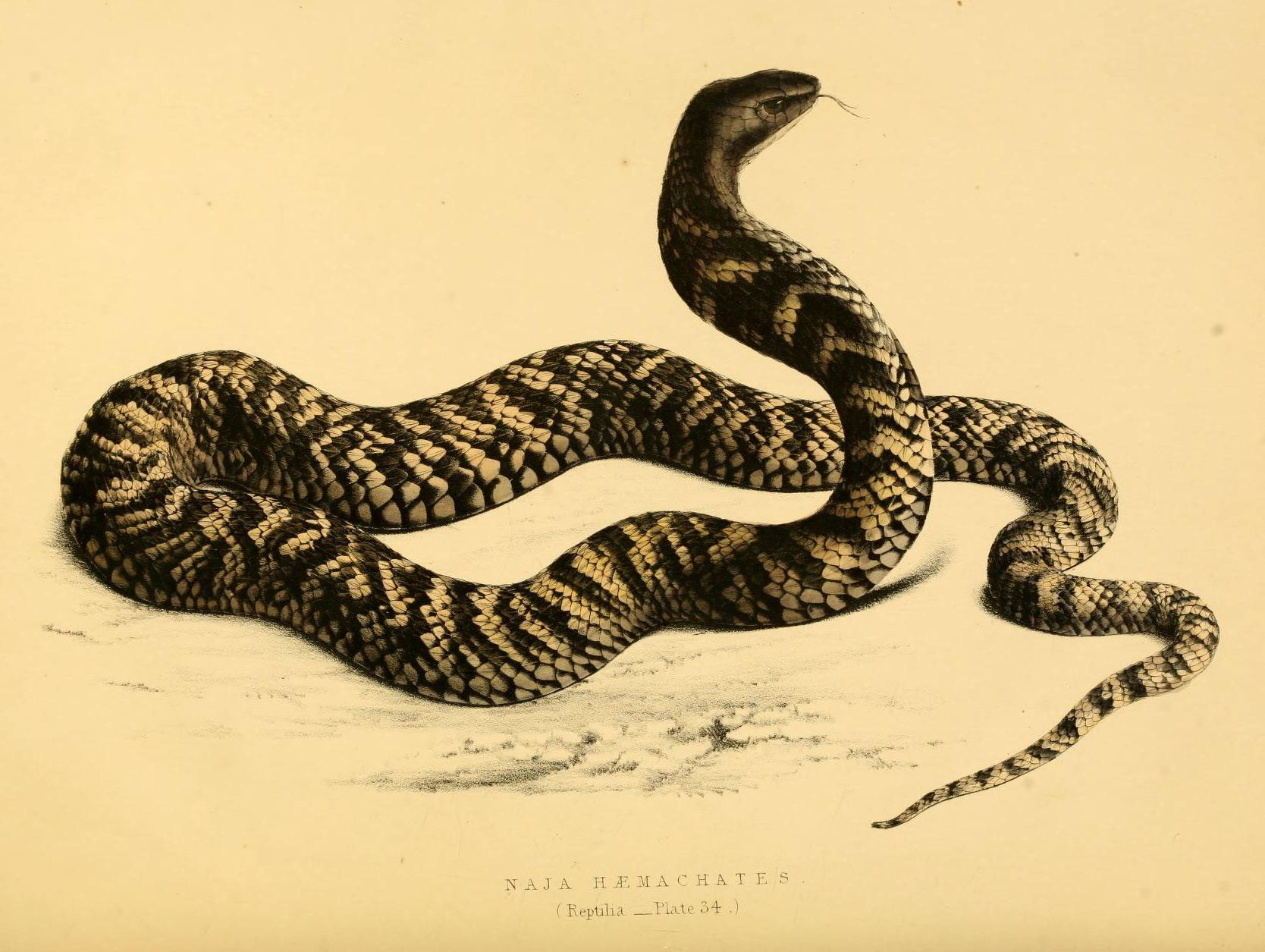
Illustration of species in South Africa.

The venom of the rinkhals is neurotoxic and partially cytotoxic, and is less viscous than that of other African elapids. When confronting a human, it aims its venom at the face and the eyes. If the venom gets injected via snakebite, it causes a great amount of pain and even necrosis due to the cytotoxic effect. Local symptoms of swelling and bruising are reported in about 25% (a quarter) of cases. General symptoms of drowsiness, nausea, vomiting, violent abdominal pain, cramps and vertigo often occur, as does a mild pyrexial reaction. Polyvalent antivenom is effective for the treatment of rinkhals envenomation, and a fatality from a rinkhals bite has not been recorded in over 40 years. If the venom enters the eyes, it causes great pain and inflammation. Corneal damage can occur if left untreated, although timely first aid and eye-washing will usually lead to recovery after a few days.

A polyvalent antivenom exists in South Africa and is manufactured by the South African Vaccine Producers.A polyvalent antivenom is currently being developed by the Universidad de Costa Rica's Instituto Clodomiro Picado.
