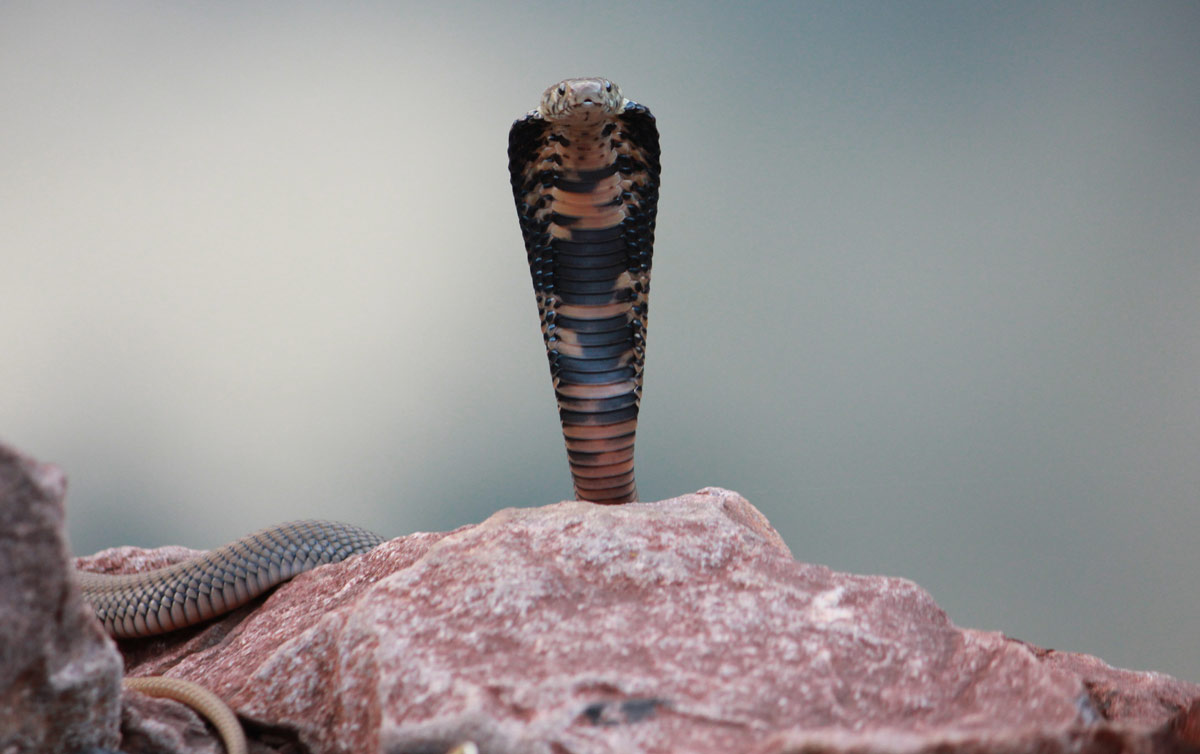

Conservation status
- Least Concern (IUCN 3.1)

Scientific classification
- Kingdom: Animalia
- Phylum: Chordata
- Class: Reptilia
- Order: Squamata
- Suborder: Serpentes
- Family: Elapidae
- Genus: Naja
- Species: N. mossambica

Binomial name
- Naja mossambica W. Peters, 1854
- Mozambique spitting cobra IUCN distribution Extant (resident)

Synonyms
- Naja nigricollis mossambica W. Peters, 1854; Naja (Afronaja) mossambica W. Peters, 1854; Afronaja mossambica (W. Peters, 1854)

= Mozambique spitting cobra =

Species of snake

The Mozambique spitting cobra (Naja mossambica) is a highly venomous species of spitting cobra in the family Elapidae. The species is native to Africa, and it is found in Angola, Botswana, Malawi, Mozambique, Namibia, South Africa, Tanzania, Zambia, and Zimbabwe.

== Taxonomy ==
German naturalist Wilhelm Peters described Naja mossambica as a species new to science in 1854.

== Description ==
In colour, Naja mossambica is slate to blue, olive or tawny black above, with some or all scales having black edging. Below, it is salmon pink to purple yellowish, with black bars across the neck and ventrals speckled or edged with brown or black; young specimens sometimes have pink or yellow bars on the throat.

The average length of adults is between 90 cm and 105 cm (3–3½ feet), but the largest specimen measured was a male 154 cm (5 feet) long in Durban, KwaZulu-Natal, South Africa.

== Distribution ==
Naja mossambica is the most common cobra of the savanna regions of tropical and subtropical Africa. The distribution includes all of Mozambique; KwaZulu-Natal, as far south as Durban; Mpumalanga's lowveld region; southeastern Tanzania and Pemba Island; and west to far southeastern Angola and northeastern Namibia. Younger specimens are much more frequently encountered in the open at daytime. Unlike the Egyptian Cobra, this species prefers localities near water, to which it will readily take when disturbed.

== Venom ==
Naja mossambica is considered one of the most dangerous snakes in Africa. Its venom is about as toxic as the American Mojave rattlesnake, considered the world's most venomous rattlesnake. Like the rinkhals, it can spit its venom. Its bite causes severe local tissue destruction (similar to that of the puff adder). Venom to the eyes can also cause impaired vision or blindness. The venom of this species contains postsynaptic neurotoxin and cytotoxin. There have been only a few fatalities resulting from bites of this species, and survivors are mostly disfigured.

A polyvalent antivenom is currently being developed by the Universidad de Costa Rica's Instituto Clodomiro Picado.

== Diet ==
The diet of Naja mossambica mainly consists of amphibians, other snakes, birds, eggs, small mammals, and occasionally even insects. This cobra has been reported to scavenge and eat carcasses in an advanced stage of decomposition. It has been documented feeding on venomous snakes such as black mambas and has developed immunity to mamba venom.

== Habits ==
Naja mossambica is nervous and temperamental. When confronted at close quarters, it can rear up as much as two-thirds of its length and spread its long narrow hood, and will readily spit in defense, usually from a reared-up position. The venom can be propelled 2–3 metres (6½–10 feet), with great accuracy. This species also can spit its venom without rearing up and flare out its neck into a hood, as well as spit from very tight spaces. The spitting cobra might bite instead of spitting depending on its circumstances, and like the rinkhals, it may feign death to avoid further molestation.

== Reproduction ==
The eggs of Naja mossambica range from 10 to 22 in number per clutch. Each hatchling has a total length (tail included) of 230–250 mm (9.1–9.8 in).
