= Intraperitoneal injection =

Injection of substances into peritoneum (body cavity)

- Other names: IP injection
- ICD-9-CM: 54.96-54.97

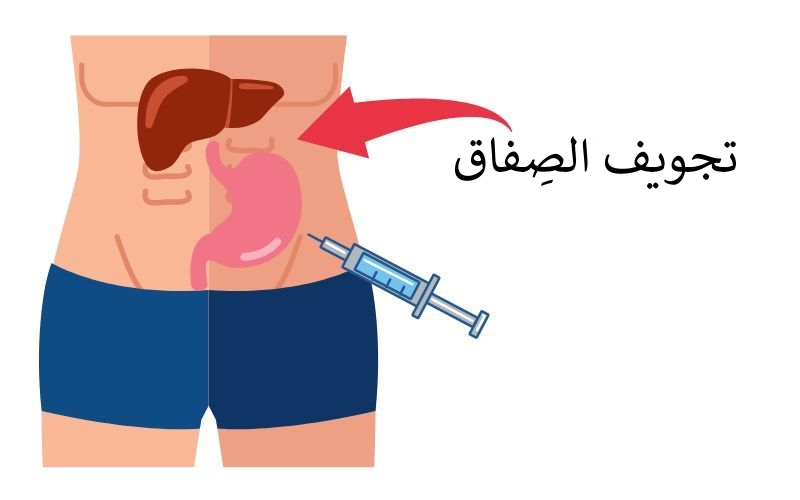

Intraperitoneal injection or IP injection is the injection of a substance into the peritoneum, which is the serous membrane that lines the abdominal cavity. The procedure is more often applied to animals than to humans, specifically as a method of drug administration in many in vivo studies. In general, it is preferred when large amounts of blood replacement fluids are needed or when low blood pressure or other problems prevent the use of a suitable blood vessel for intravenous injection.

In humans, the method is widely used to administer chemotherapy drugs to treat some cancers, particularly ovarian cancer. Although controversial, intraperitoneal use in ovarian cancer has been recommended as a standard of care. Fluids are injected intraperitoneally in infants, also used for peritoneal dialysis.

In animals used in disease research, the method is preferred due to being quick to learn and perform, relatively low-stress for the animal, and avoids needing to establish intravenous access. The viability of IP injection in preclinical drug studies, however, is also limited by the differences in metabolism and bioavailability compared to standard medication administration techniques for humans, namely intravenous, subcutaneous, and intramuscular injections.
