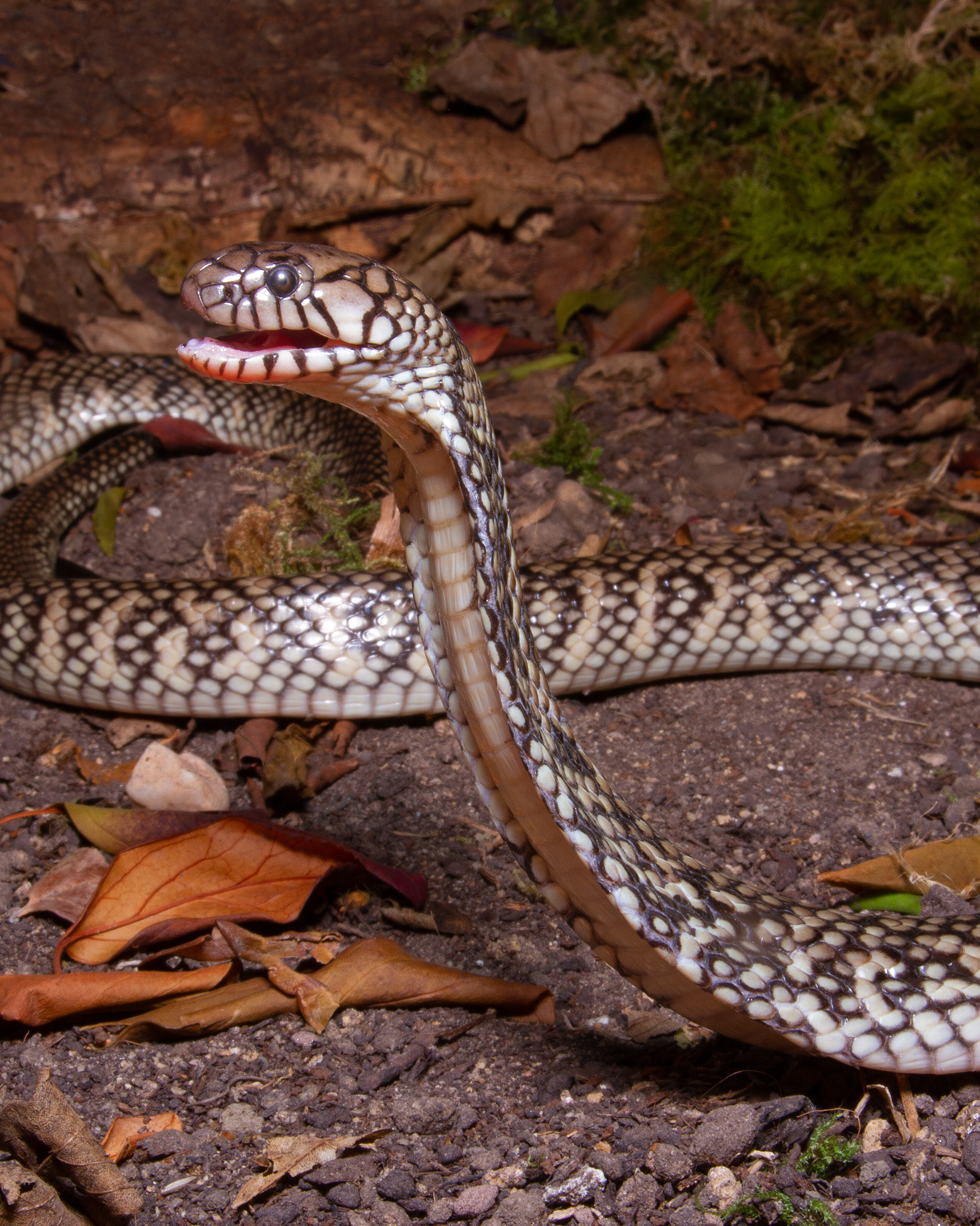

Scientific classification
- Kingdom: Animalia
- Phylum: Chordata
- Class: Reptilia
- Order: Squamata
- Suborder: Serpentes
- Family: Elapidae
- Genus: Naja
- Subgenus: Boulengerina
- Species: N. nana

Binomial name
- Naja nana Collet & Trape, 2020
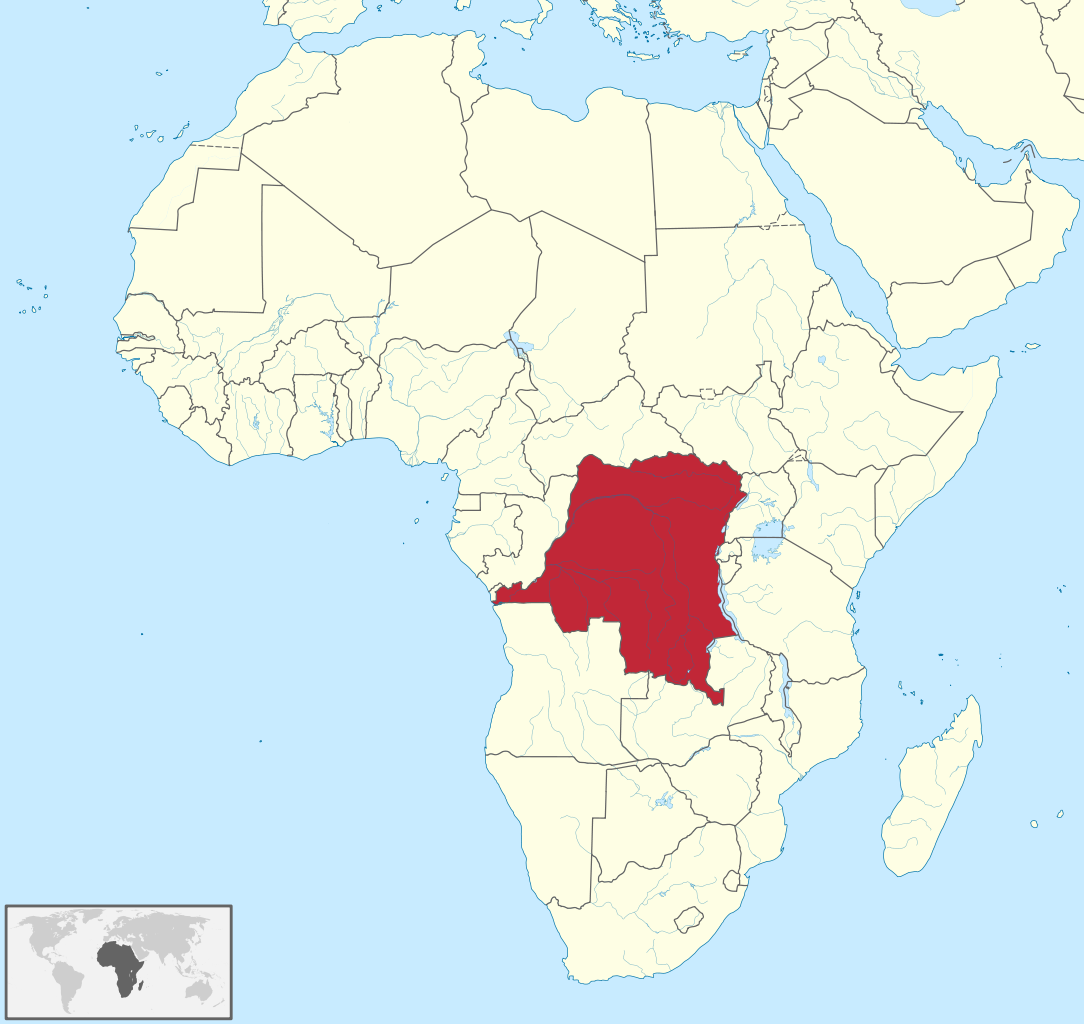
- Distribution of the dwarf water cobra

= Dwarf water cobra =

Species of snake

The dwarf water cobra (Naja nana) is a small, venomous species of aquatic cobra found in the Democratic Republic of Congo (Katanga). It was first described by Marcel Collet and Jean-Francois Trape in 2020, based on two specimens from Lake Mai-Ndombe.

== Taxonomy ==
Naja nana is classified under the genus Naja of the family Elapidae, and considered a member of the Boulengerina subgenus, along with related species such as Naja annulata, Naja christyi, and Naja melanoleuca. The genus name Naja is a Latinisation of the Sanskrit word nāgá (नाग), meaning "cobra”; the species name nana derives from the Latin word, nanus, which means dwarf, in reference to its small size.

== Description ==
The dwarf water cobra typically doesn't grow longer than 1 m (3.3 ft), unlike the two other semiaquatic African Naja species, Naja annulata and Naja christyi, both of which can attain lengths of up to about 2.5 m (8.2 ft).

Distinguishing features of the species include its characteristic defensive posture, its aquatic lifestyle, the straight-row arrangement of its dorsal scales, and its distinctive coloration: black with small white or yellowish spots, a whitish abdomen, and a black underside of the tail.

The eggs of the dwarf water cobra are large and elongated, and require 70 days of incubation to hatch.

== Behavior ==
Dwarf water cobras can swim and climb, but generally prefer a terrestrial habitat, although they will hunt and defecate in water when able. In the wild they are exclusively piscivorous, although in captivity they are often fed a rodent-based diet. One case of cannibalism of a conspecific snake is known.
