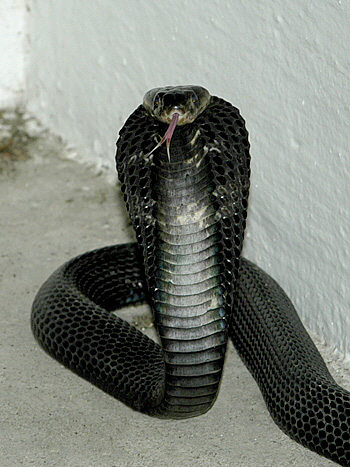

Conservation status
- Least Concern (IUCN 3.1)
- CITES Appendix II (CITES)

Scientific classification
- Kingdom: Animalia
- Phylum: Chordata
- Class: Reptilia
- Order: Squamata
- Suborder: Serpentes
- Family: Elapidae
- Genus: Naja
- Species: N. sumatrana

Binomial name
- Naja sumatrana Müller, 1890
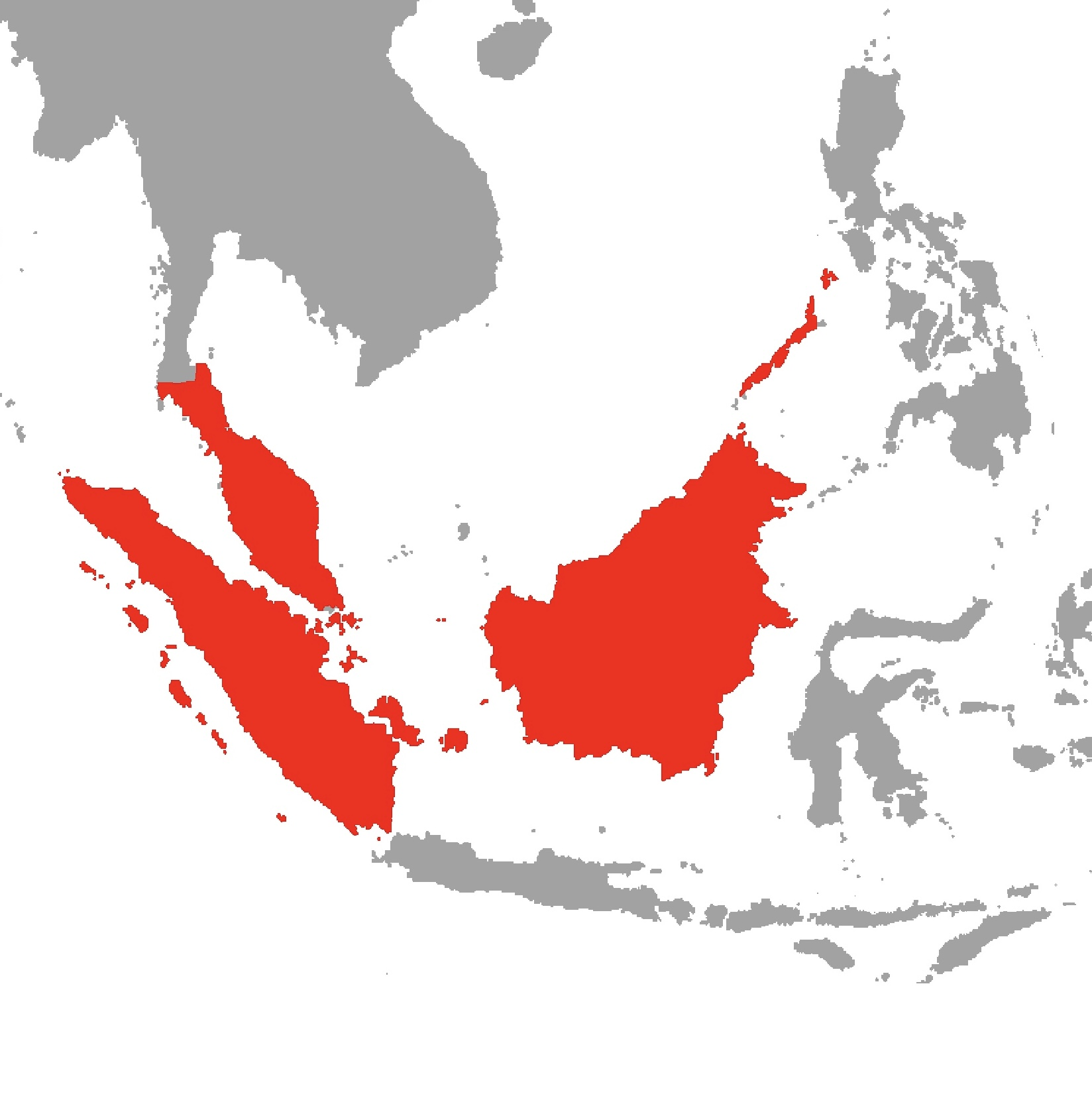

= Equatorial spitting cobra =

Species of snake

The Equatorial spitting cobra (Naja sumatrana) also called the Malayan spitting cobra, golden spitting cobra, Sumatran spitting cobra, or Palawan spitting cobra, is a species of spitting cobra found in Southeast Asia.

== Description ==
This species is medium in length, averaging between 0.9 to 1.2 metres (3.0 to 3.9 ft) in length, though they can grow up to 1.5 metres (4.9 ft). The body is compressed dorsoventrally and sub-cylindrical posteriorly. The head of this species is elliptical, depressed, and slightly distinct from the neck with a short, rounded snout and large nostrils. Eyes are medium in size with round pupils. Dorsal scales are smooth and strongly oblique. This species of cobra has no hood marks and colouration varies based upon geographical location. There are two colour phases: a yellow form commonly found in Thailand and Northern Peninsular Malaysia, and a black form found in Peninsular Malaysia, Singapore, and the islands where it occurs in Indonesia and the Philippines. Juveniles and adults also tend to be of different colour.

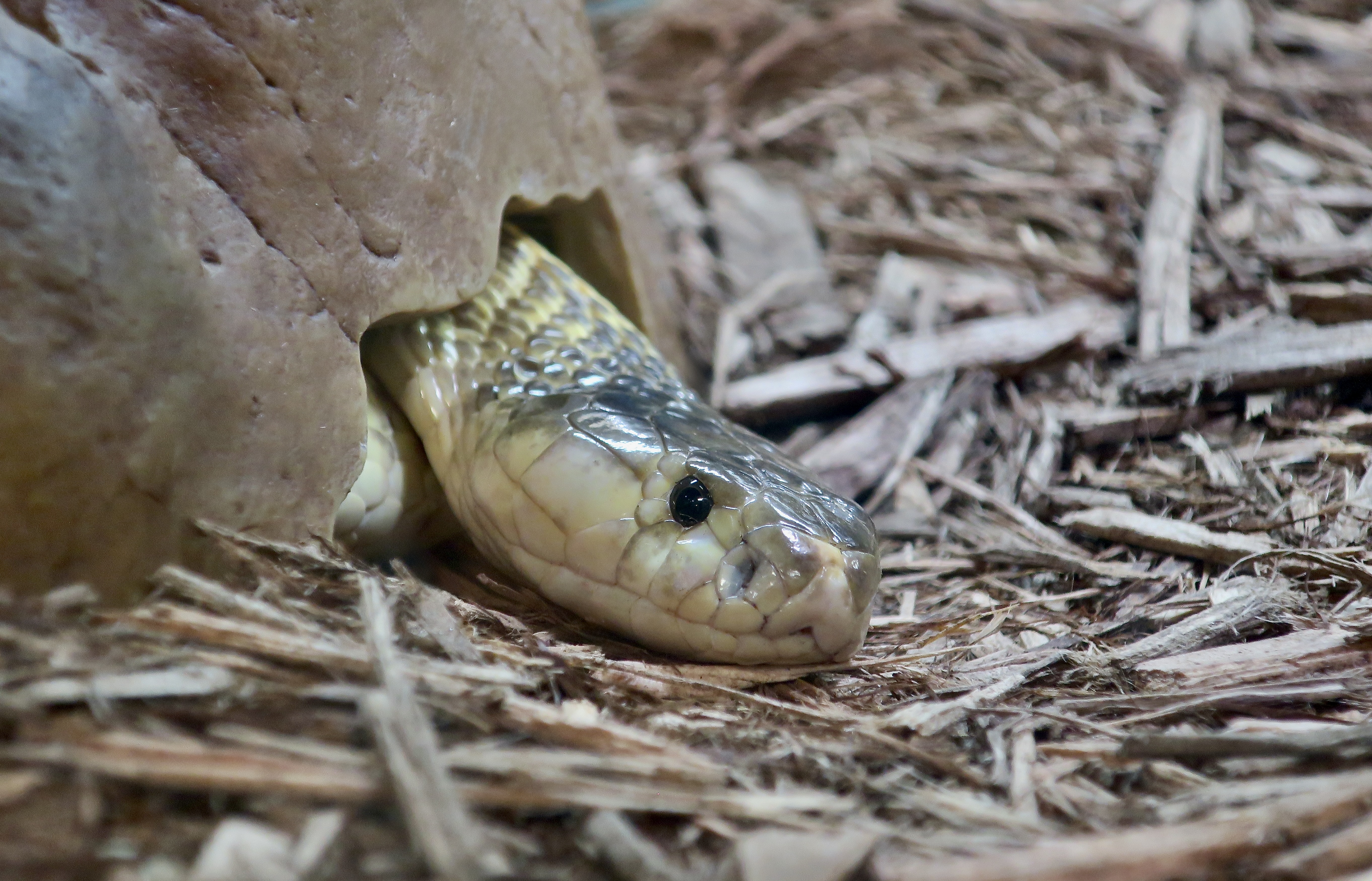
An equatorial spitting cobra at Phoenix Herpetological Society.

=== Scalation ===
19-27 rows around the hood (normally 21–25), 15-19 just ahead of the mid-body; 179-201 ventrals, 40-57 subcaudals; basal subcaudals are often undivided.

== Taxonomy ==
The population currently included in Naja sumatrana have a confusing history. The species was first defined as currently understood in 1989. Previously, the populations of this species were assigned to several different subspecies of Naja naja (Indian cobra), in particular N. n. sumatrana (Sumatra), N.n. sputatrix (Peninsular Malaysia) and N.n. miolepis (Borneo, Palawan). Some confusion over names has persisted into the more recent toxinological literature, in particular the misapplication of the name sputatrix to venoms of Naja sumatrana from Peninsular Malaysia.

== Distribution ==
This species of cobra is found in the equatorial Southeast Asian nations of Brunei, Indonesia, Malaysia, Singapore, Thailand, and in the Philippines. In Indonesia it occurs on the islands of Sumatra, Borneo, Bangka, Belitung, and the Riau Archipelago. It may occur on neighboring islands in Indonesia, and it is possible that remnant populations still occur in western Java. In the Philippines, it only occurs in the Palawan group of islands (including the Calamian Islands).

== Habitat and ecology ==
This species can be found in elevations up to about 1,500 metres (4,900 ft) above sea level in mainly primary and secondary tropical forests (including dense jungle terrain); however, it has also been found in gardens, parks, and in urban areas where it may come in contact with humans. It is a terrestrial and mainly diurnal snake that feeds mainly on rodents and frogs, but will also feed on other snakes, lizards and small mammals. Though not too aggressive in nature (unlike the yellow specimens reported from Thailand being highly aggressive and more prone to spitting in copious amounts without running out of venom), these snakes can and will readily spit venom, even from up in the trees, when they are cornered or threatened. They will also strike and bite.

== Venom ==
Like other cobra species, this snake possesses postsynaptic neurotoxic venom. The venom also consists of cardiotoxins and cytotoxins. Although the venom of the Equatorial spitting cobra (N. sumatrana) exhibited the common characteristic enzymatic activities of Asiatic spitting cobra venoms, the protein composition of the Equatorial spitting cobra venom is distinct from venoms of the other two sympatric spitting cobras, the Javan spitting cobra (N. sputatrix) and Indochinese spitting cobra (N. siamensis). However, this species' venom contains low protease, phosphodiesterase, alkaline phosphomonoesterase and L-amino-acid oxidase activities, moderately high acetylcholinesterase and hyaluronidase activities and high phospholipase A_{2}. Cardiotoxins represented 40% of the snake's venom protein, higher than sympatric cobras: N. sputatrix (35%), N. siamensis (30%), and N. kaouthia (18%; non-spitting cobra). This species presented an IV LD_{50} of 0.5 mg/kg (Malaysia).
