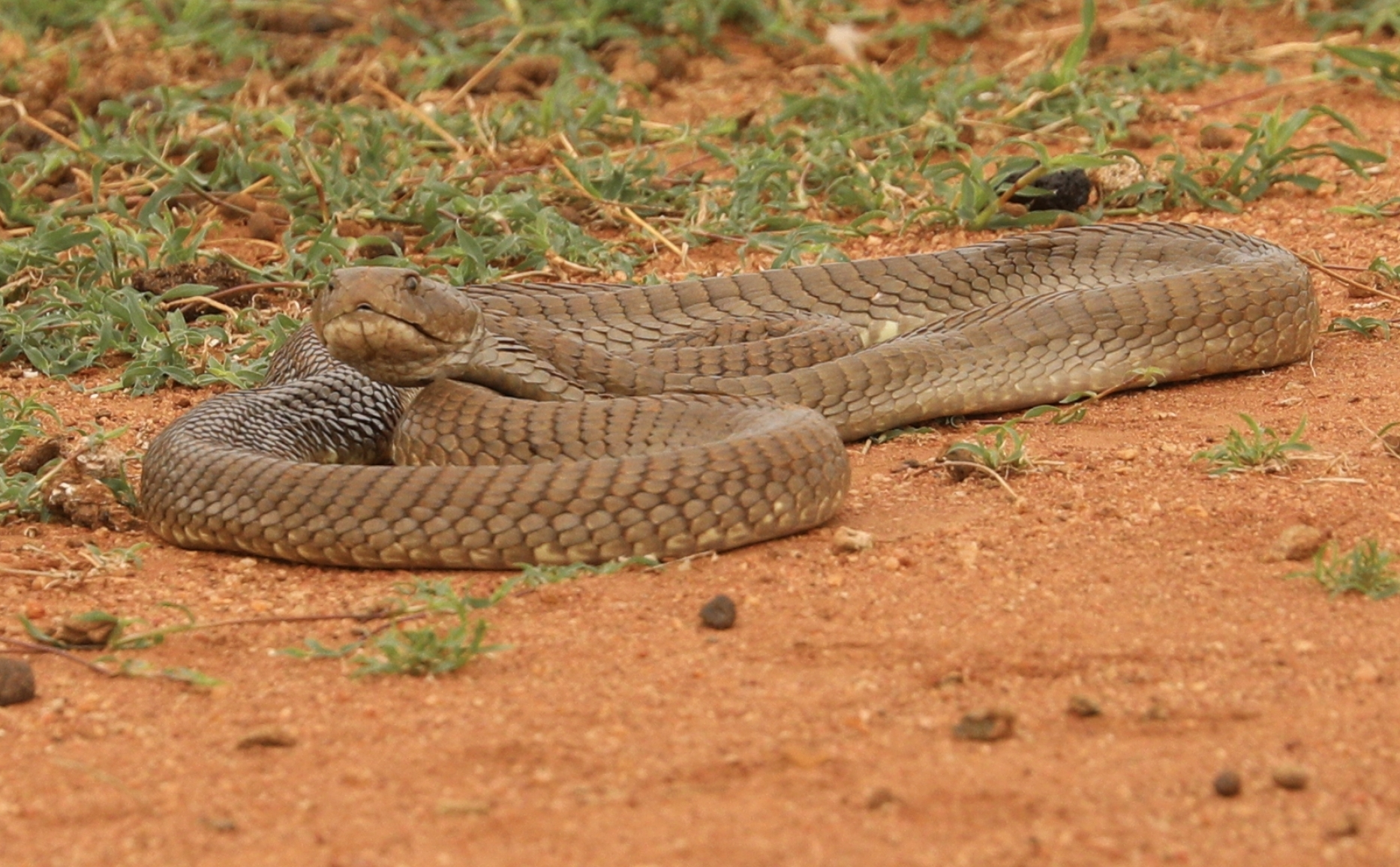

Conservation status
- Least Concern (IUCN 3.1)

Scientific classification
- Kingdom: Animalia
- Phylum: Chordata
- Class: Reptilia
- Order: Squamata
- Suborder: Serpentes
- Family: Elapidae
- Genus: Naja
- Subgenus: Afronaja
- Species: N. ashei

Binomial name
- Naja ashei Wüster & Broadley, 2007

= Naja ashei =

Species of snake

Naja ashei, commonly known as Ashe's spitting cobra or the giant spitting cobra, is a species of venomous snake in the family Elapidae. The species is native to Africa. It is the world's largest species of spitting cobra.

== Etymology and taxonomy ==
The generic name, Naja, is a Latinisation of the Sanskrit word nāgá (नाग), meaning "serpent". The specific epithet, ashei, honors the late James Ashe, who founded the Bio-Ken Snake Farm and was one of the first experts to suggest N. ashei was a new species. Its differences from other spitting cobras were recognized in the 1960s, but it was initially regarded by most as merely a brown-coloured form of the black-necked spitting cobra (N. nigricollis). Thus, N. ashei was only classified as a distinct species in 2007, by Wolfgang Wüster (Bangor University, Wales) and Donald Broadley (Biodiversity Foundation for Africa). Royjan Taylor (Director of the Bio-Ken Snake Farm in Watamu, Kenya) was instrumental in providing specimens, among them the holotype.

The giant spitting cobra is most closely related to the Mozambique spitting cobra (N. mossambica), which with this species forms a sister taxon to N. nigricollis.

== Description ==
Naja ashei, the largest spitting cobra, averages around 1.3–2.0 m (4.3–6.6 ft) in total length (including tail). The largest specimen of this species to date, caught in Kenya, was 2.7 m (8.9 ft) in total length. Some N. nigricollis may also reach such sizes, but this is very exceptional, whereas on the Kenyan coast, specimens of N. ashei of more than 2 m (6.6 ft) are not uncommon.

This Naja species is very heavily built with a big head. It's a very defensive spitting cobra that doesn't hesitate to spit when it feels cornered. It may also spit in copious amounts for hours without running out of venom immediately to spit. Its colour varies in different shades of brown from light grey through pale mustard to dark brown. It is pale in colour along the belly, sometimes with slight speckling or blotches, with a dark brown throat band. It has 17 to 25 midbody dorsal scale rows, 176 to 219 ventrals, and 51 to 69 subcaudals, with an entire anal scale across the vent.

== Distribution and habitat ==
The giant spitting cobra is found in eastern and northeastern Africa, in the dry lowlands of northern and eastern Kenya and similar habitats in northeastern Uganda, southern Ethiopia and southern Somalia.

== Venom ==
The venom of N. ashei is very similar in composition to that of other spitting cobras, including the black-necked spitting cobra (N. nigricollis) and the red spitting cobra (N. pallida), which are both found in the same areas. It consists of postsynaptic neurotoxins and cytotoxins. However, N. ashei is capable of injecting a much larger volume of venom in a single bite compared to the others. A single specimen milked at Bio-Ken Snake Farm in 2004 produced a wet venom yield of 6.2 ml, weighed 7.1 g and contained nearly 3 g of toxins.

In absence of dedicated research, recommended treatment of bites is, as for all true cobras, with the appropriate antivenom (SAVP polyvalent from South African Vaccine Producers). The dosage may need to be higher than for the average N. nigricollis bite. First aid treatment for venom in the eyes is immediate irrigation with water or any bland liquid - failure to do so may result in permanent blindness. Whether bitten or spat at, the patient should be seen as soon as possible by a physician. No available data suggest this species' toxins differ clinically from those of other spitting cobras, except perhaps by the effects of greater dosages, on average. Spitting cobra venom has rather low systemic toxicity, meaning with appropriate treatment, survival of bitten persons is very likely. A strong necrotizing effect (kills tissue around the wound) means survivors may be disfigured. If a jet of venom gets into the eyes and is not treated immediately, blindness (due to destruction of the cornea) is likely; even in patients treated with antivenom, amputation may become necessary if a full dose of a large spitting cobra's venom is received.
