= Naja obscura =

Scientific classification
- Kingdom: Animalia
- Phylum: Chordata
- Class: Reptilia
- Order: Squamata
- Suborder: Serpentes
- Family: Elapidae
- Genus: Naja
- Species: N. obscura

Binomial name
- Naja obscura Saleh & Trape, 2023

Species of snake

Naja obscura is a species of venomous snake belonging to the family Elapidae. The species is endemic to Egypt. Alongside Naja haje and Naja nubiae, it is one of three cobra species in Egypt. Naja obscura was described in 2023, but local snake dealers had recognized its distinctiveness for a long time. Naja obscura is a non-spitting cobra with a potentially lethal bite.

== Description ==
Naja obscura is a blackish cobra species. It can be confused with melanistic individuals of Naja haje, but the species are easily separated based on head scalation. Naja haje has subocular scales separating the eye from the supralabials, whereas Naja obscura lacks suboculars, with the eye being in contact with two supralabials. Naja nubiae also lacks subocular scales, but it has 2–3 anterior temporal scales as compared to one in Naja obscura, and the sixth supralabial is not in contact with the postoculars like it is in Naja obscura. In addition, the head and back of Naja nubiae are light brown, not blackish.

== Bibliography ==
- Trape, Jean-François (2023). Guide des serpents d'Afrique occidentale, centrale et d'Afrique du Nord (in French). Marseille: IRD Éditions. ISBN 978-2-7099-2976-9. 896 pp.
