= Many-banded snake =

Conservation status
- Least Concern (IUCN 3.1)

Scientific classification
- Kingdom: Animalia
- Phylum: Chordata
- Class: Reptilia
- Order: Squamata
- Suborder: Serpentes
- Family: Elapidae
- Genus: Naja
- Subgenus: Boulengerina
- Species: N. multifasciata

Binomial name
- Naja multifasciata (F. Werner, 1902)
- distribution

Synonyms
- Naia mulifasciata F. Werner, 1902; Paranaja multifasciata — Harding & Welch, 1980; Naja multifasciata — Wüster et al, 2007; Naja (Boulengerina) multifasciata — Wallach et al., 2009; Boulengerina multifasciata — Wallach et al., 2014

Species of snake

The many-banded snake (Naja multifasciata), also known commonly as the burrowing cobra, is a species of venomous snake in the family Elapidae. The species is native to Central Africa. There are three recognized subspecies.

== Geographic range ==
N. multifasciata is found in Angola, Cameroon, the Democratic Republic of Congo, Equatorial Guinea, Gabon, the Republic of Congo, and the Central African Republic.

== Habitat ==
The preferred natural habitat of N. multifasciata is marshy areas of forest, at elevations up to 800 m (2,600 ft).

== Description ==
N. multifasciata is a small snake with an adult size of 50 cm (20 in) and maximum size of about 81 cm (32 in). The body is moderately slender with a short tail ending in a blunt spike. The head is short, flattened, and slightly distinct from neck; the neck region is not capable of expansion into a hood. The eyes are medium to moderately large. The pupils are round. The dorsal scales are smooth and glossy.

== Venom ==
N. multifasciata is venomous. Its venom is similar to classical cobra venoms and appears to contain both neurotoxins and cardiotoxins.

== Reproduction ==
N. multifasciata is oviparous.

== Taxonomy ==
The genus Paranaja was synonymised with Naja in a recent molecular phylogenetic study, as this species is closely related to the forest cobra (Naja melanoleuca)

== Subspecies ==
Three subspecies are recognized as being valid, including the nominotypical subspecies.

- Naja multifasciata anomala Sternfeld, 1917 – Cameroon
- Naja multifasciata duttoni (Boulenger, 1904)
- Naja multifasciata multifasciata (F. Werner, 1902)

Nota bene: A trinomial authority in parentheses indicates that the subspecies was originally described in a genus other than Naja.

== Etymology ==
The subspecific name, duttoni, is in honor of British parasitologist Joseph Everett Dutton.
