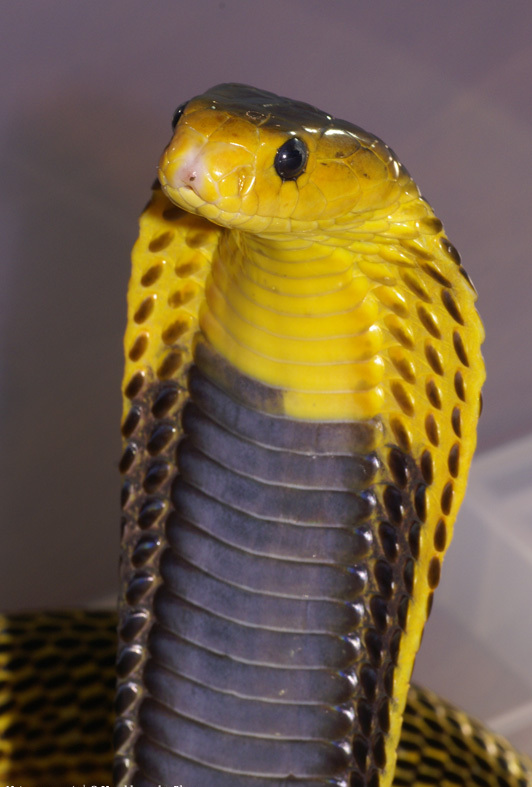

Conservation status
- Least Concern (IUCN 3.1)
- CITES Appendix II

Scientific classification
- Kingdom: Animalia
- Phylum: Chordata
- Class: Reptilia
- Order: Squamata
- Suborder: Serpentes
- Family: Elapidae
- Genus: Naja
- Species: N. samarensis

Binomial name
- Naja samarensis Peters, 1861
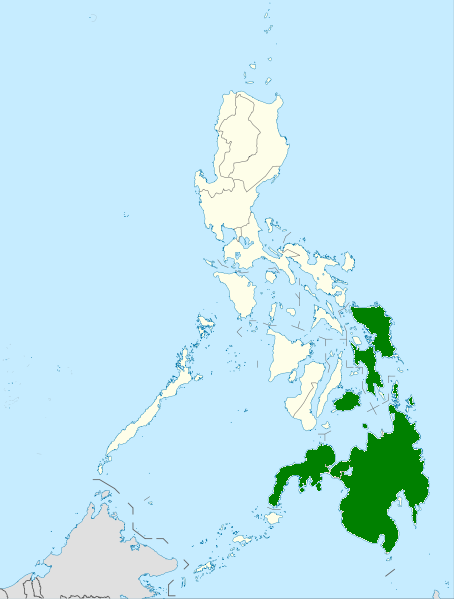
- Distribution of the Samar cobra

= Samar cobra =

Species of snake

The Samar cobra (Naja samarensis) also called Peters' cobra, southern Philippine cobra or Visayan cobra, is a highly venomous species of spitting cobra native to the Visayas and Mindanao island groups of the Philippines.

== Description ==
The Samar cobra is a species of spitting cobra that can grow up to 1.4 meters (4.6 ft) in length. Their coloring varies from a black and yellow to green.

== Scalation ==
There are 17–25 scale rows around the hood, 17–19 ahead of mid-body; 161–184 ventrals, 41–52 subcaudals, basal pairs sometimes undivided.

== Reproduction ==
The Samar cobra, or southeastern Philippines cobra, is oviparous, laying clutches of up to eight eggs.

== Distribution and habitat ==
The Samar cobra is endemic to the southern Philippines, specifically to the Visayas and Mindanao island groups.

Habitat can vary widely from mountainous jungle to tropical plains. They can live close to human settlements.

The Samar cobra typically lives at an elevation of 0–1,000 metres (0–3,300 ft) above sea level.

== Behavior and diet ==
Like the Philippine cobra (Naja philippinensis), the Samar cobra feeds mostly on small rodents such as rats and mice. They will also prey upon frogs and smaller reptiles. Since their main food source is attracted to rice paddies and human settlements, this species often comes into conflict with people.

== Venom ==
A proteomic study revealed a unique venom phenotype of the Samar cobra, which represents the easternmost dispersal of Naja cobra species. Like other Naja spp., Three-finger toxins (3FTx) dominate the venom proteome. 3FTx constituted 90% of the total venom proteins, recording by far the highest 3FTx abundance in snake venom. Other proteins in the venom comprised snake venom metalloproteinases (SVMP, 4.17%) and phospholipases A_{2} (PLA_{2} 3.76%). The rest of minor toxins collectively accounted for <2% of total venom proteins; these were toxin families of cysteine-rich secretory protein (CRiSP, 1.06%), L-amino acid oxidase (LAAO, 0.26%), venom nerve growth factor (vNGF, 0.13%) and vespryn (VES, 0.13%). The crude venom of N. samarensis has LD_{50} of 0.2mg/kg via intravenous injection (IV). They are noted for their nervous behavior, and are quick to strike as well as to spray venom, which they generally aim towards the face and eyes. However, the cobra is more reluctant to spit venom than its northern relative, the Northern Philippines cobra. If venom gets in the eyes, it causes extreme pain and mechanical damage to the eyeball. If not properly flushed out, it can result in permanent blindness due to its tissue destroying properties.
