= Falcon indigo snake =

Conservation status
- Least Concern (IUCN 3.1)

Scientific classification
- Kingdom: Animalia
- Phylum: Chordata
- Class: Reptilia
- Order: Squamata
- Suborder: Serpentes
- Family: Colubridae
- Genus: Drymarchon
- Species: D. caudomaculatus

Binomial name
- Drymarchon caudomaculatus Wüster, Yrausquin & Mijares-Urrutia, 2001
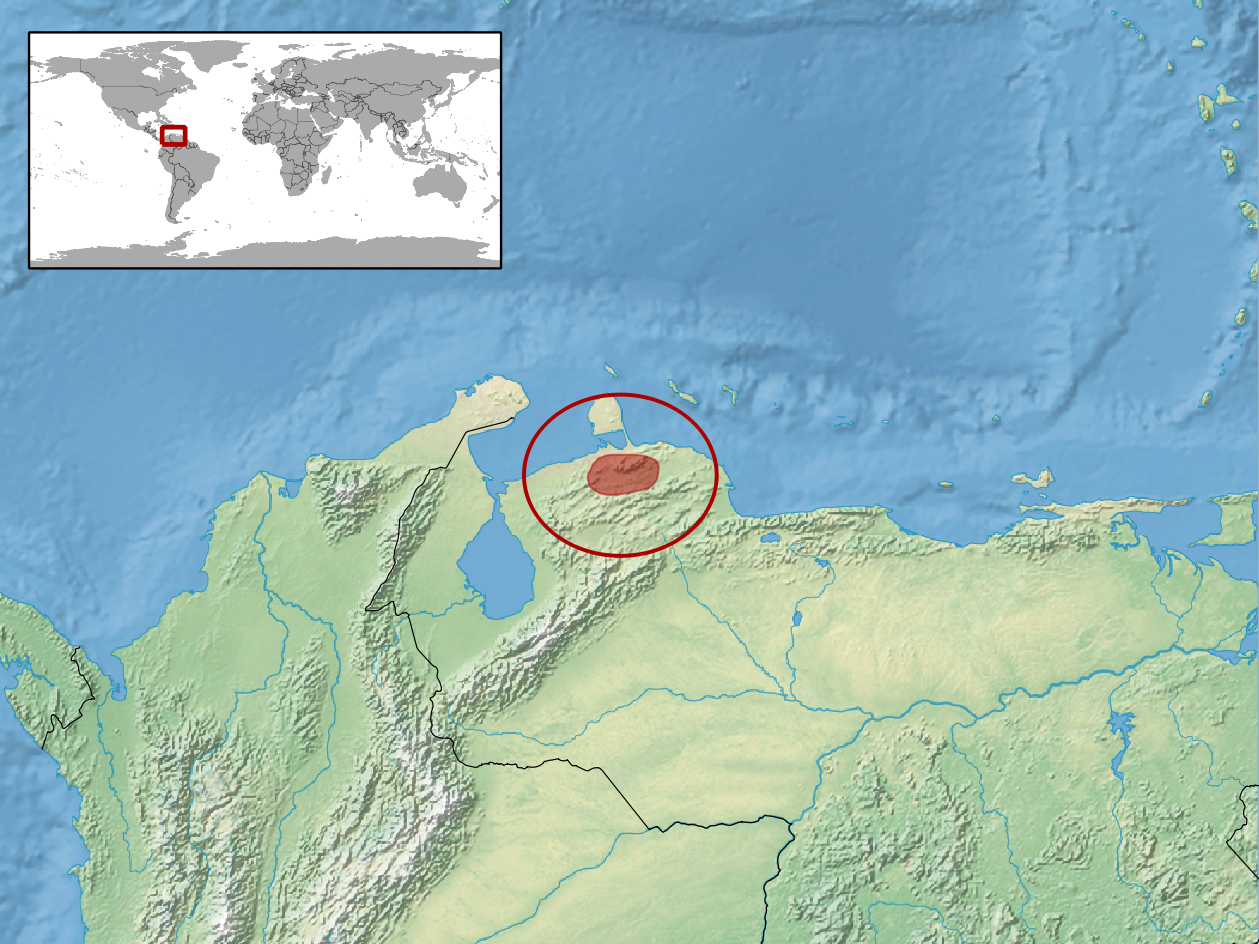

Species of snake

The falcon indigo snake our Auril (Drymarchon caudomaculatus) is a species of nonvenomous snake in the family Colubridae. The species is found in Venezuela and Colombia.
