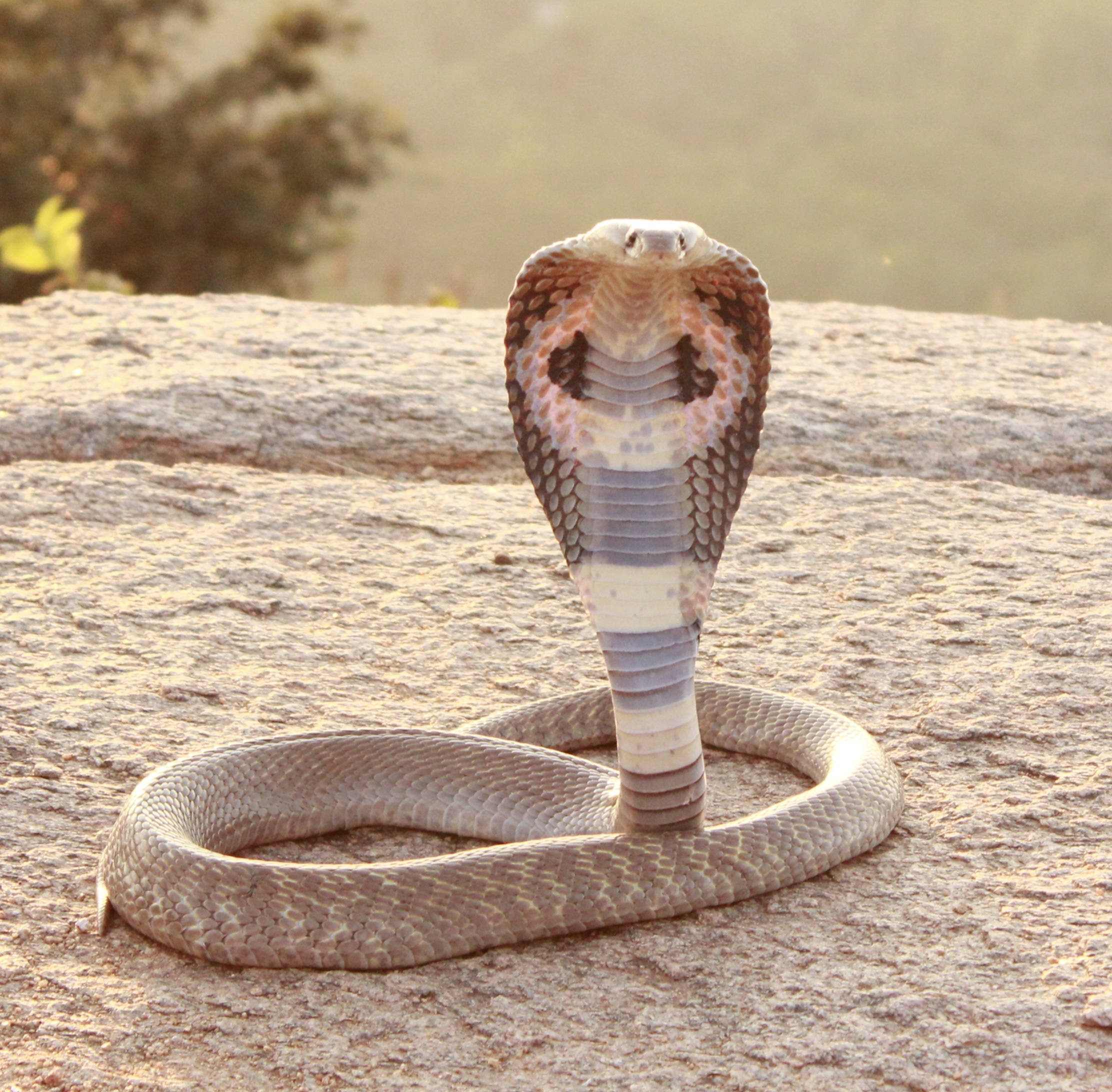
- Indian cobra (Naja naja), species typica of the genus

Scientific classification
- Kingdom: Animalia
- Phylum: Chordata
- Class: Reptilia
- Order: Squamata
- Suborder: Serpentes
- Family: Elapidae
- Genus: Naja; Laurenti, 1768

Type species
- Coluber naja Linnaeus, 1758

= Naja =

Naja Temporal range: Miocene–Holocene

Genus of snakes

Naja is a genus of venomous elapid snakes commonly known as cobras (or "true cobras"). Various species occur throughout Africa, Southwest Asia, South Asia, and Southeast Asia. Several other elapid species are often called "cobras", such as the king cobra and the rinkhals, but they are not "true cobras", in that they do not belong to the genus Naja.

Until recently, the genus Naja had 20 to 22 species, but it has undergone several taxonomic revisions in recent years, so sources vary greatly. Wide support exists, though, for a 2009 revision that synonymised the genera Boulengerina and Paranaja with Naja. According to that revision, the genus Naja now includes 38 species.

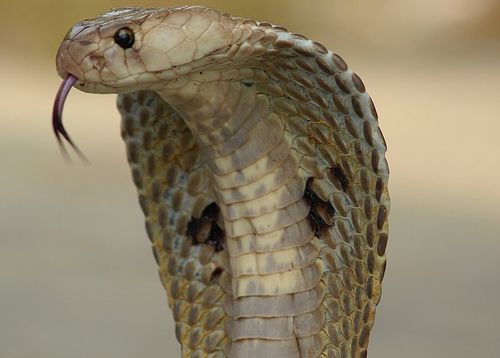
Indian cobra (Naja naja)

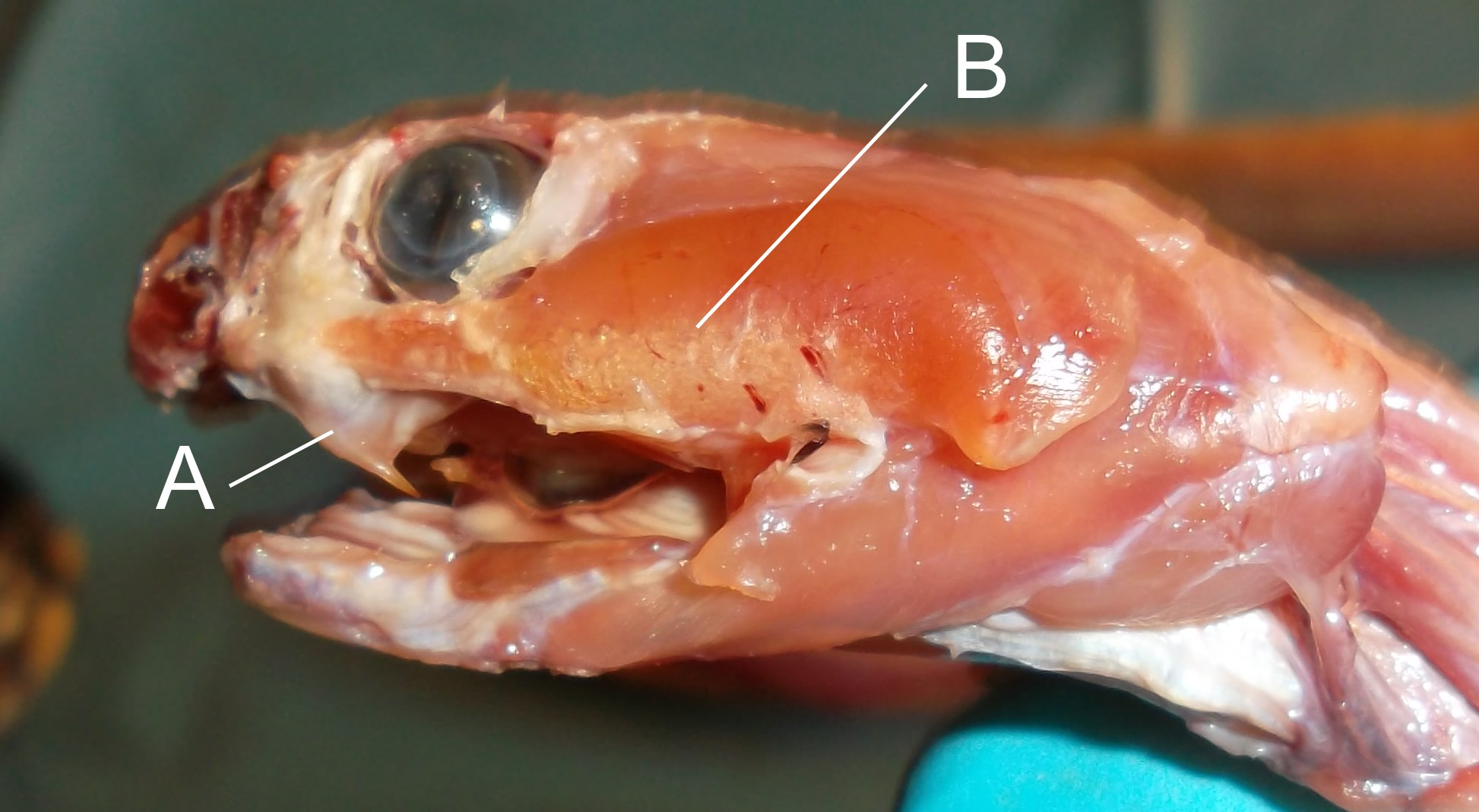
Dissected head of Naja melanoleuca showing (A) the fangs and (B) the venom gland

== Etymology ==
The origin of the generic name, Naja, is from the Sanskrit nāga (with a hard "g") meaning "snake". Some hold that the Sanskrit word is cognate with English "snake", Germanic: *snēk-a-, Proto-IE: *(s)nēg-o-, but Manfred Mayrhofer calls this etymology "not credible", and suggests a more plausible etymology connecting it with Sanskrit nagna, "hairless" or "naked".

== Description ==
Naja species vary in length, and most are relatively slender-bodied snakes. Most species are capable of attaining a total length (tail included) of 1.84 m (6.0 ft). Maximum lengths for some of the larger species of cobras are around 3.1 m (10 ft), with the forest cobra (Naja melanoleuca) arguably being the longest species. All have a characteristic ability to raise the front quarter of the body off the ground and flatten the neck to appear larger to a potential predator. Fang structure is variable. All species except the Indian cobra (Naja naja), Egyptian cobra (Naja haje) and Caspian cobra (Naja oxiana) have some degree of adaptation to spitting.

== Venom ==
All species in the genus Naja are capable of delivering a fatal bite to a human. Most species have strongly neurotoxic venom, which attacks the nervous system, causing paralysis, but many also have cytotoxic features that cause swelling and necrosis, and have a significant anticoagulant effect. Some also have cardiotoxic components to their venom.

Several Naja species, referred to as spitting cobras, have a specialized venom delivery mechanism, in which their front fangs, instead of ejecting venom downward through an elongated discharge orifice (similar to a hypodermic needle), have a shortened, rounded opening in the front surface, which ejects the venom forward, out of the mouth. While typically referred to as "spitting", the action is more like squirting. The range and accuracy with which they can shoot their venom varies from species to species, and it is used primarily as a defense mechanism. The venom has little or no effect on unbroken skin, but if it enters the eyes, it can cause a severe burning sensation and temporary or even permanent blindness if not washed out immediately and thoroughly.

A recent study showed that all three spitting cobra lineages have evolved higher pain-inducing activity through increased phospholipase A2 levels, which potentiate the pain-inducing action of the cytotoxins present in most cobra venoms. The timing of the origin of spitting in African and Asian Naja species corresponds to the separation of the human and chimpanzee evolutionary lineages in Africa and the arrival of Homo erectus in Asia. The authors therefore hypothesize that the arrival of bipedal, tool-using primates may have triggered the evolution of spitting in cobras.

The Caspian cobra (N. oxiana) of Central Asia is the most venomous Naja species. According to a 2019 study, the murine LD_{50} via intravenous injection value for Naja oxiana (Iranian specimens) was estimated to be 0.14 mg/kg (0.067-0.21 mg/kg) more potent than the sympatric Pakistani Naja naja karachiensis and Naja naja indusi found in far north and northwest India and adjacent Pakistani border areas (0.22 mg/kg), the Thai Naja kaouthia (0.2 mg/kg), and Naja philippinensis at 0.18 mg/kg (0.11-0.3 mg/kg). Latifi (1984) listed a subcutaneous value of 0.2 mg/kg (0.16-0.47 mg/kg) for N. oxiana. The crude venom of N. oxiana produced the lowest known lethal dose (LCLo) of 0.005 mg/kg, the lowest among all cobra species ever recorded, derived from an individual case of envenomation by intracerebroventricular injection. The Banded water cobra's LD_{50} was estimated to be 0.17 mg/kg via IV according to Christensen (1968). The Philippine cobra (N. philippinensis) has an average murine LD_{50} of 0.18 mg/kg IV (Tan et al, 2019). Minton (1974) reported 0.14 mg/kg IV for the Philippine cobra. The Samar cobra (Naja samarensis), another cobra species endemic to the southern islands of the Philippines, is reported to have a LD_{50} of 0.2 mg/kg, similar in potency to the monocled cobras (Naja kaouthia) which also have a LD_{50} of 0.2 mg/kg. The spectacled cobras that are sympatric with N. oxiana, in Pakistan and far northwest India, also have a high potency of 0.22 mg/kg.

Other highly venomous species are the forest cobras and/or water cobras (Boulengerina subgenus). The murine intraperitoneal LD_{50} of Naja annulata and Naja christyi venoms were 0.143 mg/kg (range of 0.131 mg/kg to 0.156 mg/kg) and 0.120 mg/kg, respectively. Christensen (1968) also listed an IV LD_{50} of 0.17 mg/kg for N. annulata. The Chinese cobra (N. atra) is also highly venomous. Minton (1974) listed a value of LD_{50} 0.3 mg/kg intravenous (IV), while Lee and Tseng list a value of 0.67 mg/kg subcutaneous injection (SC). The LD_{50} of the Cape cobra (N. nivea) according to Minton, 1974 was 0.35 mg/kg (IV) and 0.4 mg/kg (SC). The Senegalese cobra (N. senegalensis) has a murine LD_{50} of 0.39 mg/kg (Tan et al, 2021) via IV. The Egyptian cobra (N. haje) of Ugandan locality had an IV LD_{50} of 0.43 mg/kg (0.35–0.52 mg/kg).

== Medical importance ==
The Naja species is a medically important group of snakes, due to the number of bites and fatalities the species causes across its geographical range throughout Africa (including some parts of the Sahara where Naja haje can be found), Southwest Asia, Central Asia, South Asia, East Asia, and Southeast Asia. Roughly 30% of bites by some cobra species are dry (or venomless) bites, thus do not cause envenomation. Brown (1973) noted that cobras with a higher rates of 'sham strikes' tend to be more venomous, while those with a less toxic venom tend to envenomate more frequently when attempting to bite. This can vary even between specimens of the same species. This is unlike related elapids, such as those species belonging to Dendroaspis (mambas) and Bungarus (kraits), with mambas tending to almost always envenomate and kraits tending to envenomate more often than they attempt 'sham strikes'.

Many factors influence the differences in cases of fatality between different species within the same genus. Among cobras, the cases of fatal outcome of bites in both treated and untreated victims can be quite large. For example, mortality rates among untreated cases of envenomation by the cobras as a whole group ranges from 6.5–10% for N. kaouthia. to about 80% for N. oxiana. Mortality rate for N. atra is between 15 and 20%, 5–10% for N. nigricollis, 50% for N. nivea, 20–25% for N. naja, In cases where victims of cobra bites are medically treated using normal treatment protocol for elapid type envenomation, differences in prognosis depend on the cobra species involved. The vast majority of envenomated patients treated make quick and complete recoveries, while other envenomated patients who receive similar treatment result in fatalities. The most important factors in the difference of mortality rates among victims envenomated by cobras are the severity of the bite and which cobra species caused the envenomation. The Caspian cobra (N. oxiana) and the Philippine cobra (N. philippinensis) are the two cobra species with the most toxic venom, based on LD_{50} studies on mice. Both species cause prominent neurotoxicity and progression of life-threatening symptoms following envenomation. Death has been reported in as little as 30 minutes in cases of envenomation by both species. N. philippinensis purely neurotoxic venom causes prominent neurotoxicity with minimal local tissue damage and pain and patients respond very well to antivenom therapy if treatment is administered rapidly after envenomation. Envenomation caused by N. oxiana is much more complicated. In addition to prominent neurotoxicity, very potent cytotoxic and cardiotoxic components are in this species' venom. Local effects are marked and manifest in all cases of envenomation: severe pain, severe swelling, bruising, blistering, and tissue necrosis. Renal damage and cardiotoxicity are also clinical manifestations of envenomation caused by N. oxiana, though they are rare and secondary. The untreated mortality rate among those envenomed by N. oxiana approaches 80%, the highest among all species within the genus Naja. Antivenom is not as effective for envenomation by this species as it is for other Asian cobras within the same region, like the Indian cobra (N. naja), and, due to the dangerous toxicity of this species' venom, massive amounts of antivenom are often required for patients. As a result, a monovalent antivenom serum is being developed by the Razi Vaccine and Serum Research Institute in Iran. Response to treatment with antivenom is generally poor among patients, so mechanical ventilation and endotracheal intubation are required. As a result, mortality among those treated for N. oxiana envenomation is still relatively high (up to 30%) compared to all other species of cobra (under 1%).

== Taxonomy ==
The genus contains several species complexes of closely related and often similar-looking species, some of them only recently described or defined. Several recent taxonomic studies have revealed species not included in the current listing in ITIS:

- Naja anchietae (Bocage, 1879), Anchieta's cobra, is regarded as a subspecies of N. haje by Mertens (1937) and of N. annulifera by Broadley (1995). It is regarded as a full species by Broadley and Wüster (2004).
- Naja arabica Scortecci, 1932, the Arabian cobra, has long been considered a subspecies of N. haje, but was recently raised to the status of species.
- Naja ashei Broadley and Wüster, 2007, Ashe's spitting cobra, is a newly described species found in Africa and also a highly aggressive snake; it can spit a large amount of venom.
- Naja nigricincta Bogert, 1940, was long regarded as a subspecies of N. nigricollis, but was recently found to be a full species (with N. n. woodi as a subspecies).
- Naja senegalensis Trape et al., 2009, is a new species encompassing what were previously considered to be the West African savanna populations of N. haje.
- Naja peroescobari Ceríaco et al. 2017, is a new species encompassing what was previously considered the São Tomé population of N. melanoleuca.
- Naja guineensis Broadley et al., 2018, is a new species encompassing what were previously considered to be the West African forest populations of N. melanoleuca.
- Naja savannula Broadley et al., 2018, is a new species encompassing what were previously considered to be the West African savanna populations of N. melanoleuca.
- Naja subfulva Laurent, 1955, previously regarded as a subspecies of N. melanoleuca, was recently recognized as a full species.

Two molecular phylogenetic studies in the early 2000s have also supported the incorporation of the species previously assigned to the genera Boulengerina and Paranaja into Naja, as both are closely related to the forest cobra (Naja melanoleuca). In the most comprehensive phylogenetic study to date, 5 putative new species were initially identified, of which 3 have since been named.

The controversial amateur herpetologist Raymond Hoser proposed the genus Spracklandus for the African spitting cobras. Wallach et al. suggested that this name was not published according to the Code and suggested instead the recognition of four subgenera within Naja: Naja for the Asiatic cobras, Boulengerina for the African forest, water and burrowing cobras, Uraeus for the Egyptian and Cape cobra group and Afronaja for the African spitting cobras. International Commission on Zoological Nomenclature issued an opinion that it "finds no basis under the provisions of the Code for regarding the name Spracklandus as unavailable".

Asiatic cobras are believed to further be split into two groups of southeastern Asian cobras (N. siamensis, N. sumatrana, N. philippinensis, N. samarensis, N. sputatrix, and N. mandalayensis) and western and northern Asian cobras (N. oxiana, N. kaouthia, N. sagittifera, and N. atra), with Naja naja falling as the sister lineage to all other species in the subgenus.

The cladogram below illustrates the taxonomy and relationships among species of Naja following Van Wallach et al. (2009), with subgenus Uraeus resolved following Trape et al. (2009):

- Naja
  - (Naja)
    - Naja (Naja) naja
    - - - Naja (Naja) kaouthia
        - Naja (Naja) atra
      - - Naja (Naja) mandalayensis
        - Naja (Naja) siamensis
        - Naja (Naja) sputatrix
  - - (Afronaja)
      - - Naja (Afronaja) pallida
        - Naja (Afronaja) nubiae
      - - Naja (Afronaja) katiensis
        - - Naja (Afronaja) nigricollis
          - - Naja (Afronaja) ashei
            - - Naja (Afronaja) mossambica
              - Naja (Afronaja) nigricincta
    - - (Boulengerina)
        - Naja (Boulengerina) multifasciata
        - - - Naja (Boulengerina) christyi
            - Naja (Boulengerina) annulata
          - Naja (Boulengerina) melanoleuca
      - (Uraeus)
        - Naja (Uraeus) nivea
        - - - Naja (Uraeus) senegalensis
            - - Naja (Uraeus) haje
              - Naja (Uraeus) arabica
          - - Naja (Uraeus) annulifera
            - Naja (Uraeus) anchietae

=== Species ===
Genus Naja – Laurenti, 1768 – 35 extant species
Common name	Scientific name and subspecies	Range	Size and ecology	IUCN status and estimated population
Anchieta's cobra	N. anchietae Bocage, 1879	Southern Africa	Size: {{{size}}} Habitat: {{{habitat}}} Diet: {{{hunting}}}	LC
Banded water cobra	N. annulata Buchholz & Peters, 1876 Two subspecies: N. a. annulata Buchholz & Peters, 1876; N. a. stormsi (Dollo, 1886)	West and Central Africa	Size: {{{size}}} Habitat: Wetlands in forests and dense savannas Diet: Fish, possibly amphibians	LC
Snouted cobra	N. annulifera W. Peters, 1854	Southern Africa	Size: {{{size}}} Habitat: Savannas, bushveld, lowveld Diet: {{{hunting}}}	LC
Arabian cobra	N. arabica Scortecci, 1932	Oman, Saudi Arabia, Yemen	Size: {{{size}}} Habitat: Mesic habitats Diet: {{{hunting}}}	LC
Ashe's spitting cobra	N. ashei Wüster & Broadley, 2007	Southern Ethiopia, Kenya, Somalia, eastern Uganda	Size: {{{size}}} Habitat: Semi-deserts, savannas, grasslands, and woodlands Diet: {{{hunting}}}	LC
Chinese cobra	N. atra Cantor, 1842	Southern China, northern Laos, Taiwan, northern Vietnam	Size: {{{size}}} Habitat: Shrublands, agricultural land, occasionally urban areas Diet: Rats, frogs, reptiles, birds, fish	VU
Congo water cobra	N. christyi (Boulenger, 1904)	Democratic Republic of the Congo, Republic of Congo, Angola (Cabinda)	Size: {{{size}}} Habitat: {{{habitat}}} Diet: {{{hunting}}}	LC
Brown banded cobra	N. fuxi Shi, G. Vogel, Chen & Ding, 2022	China, Myanmar, Laos, Thailand, Vietnam	Size: {{{size}}} Habitat: {{{habitat}}} Diet: {{{hunting}}}	
Black forest cobra	N. guineensis Broadley, Trape, Chirio, Ineich & Wüster, 2018	Ghana, Guinea, Guinea-Bissau, the Ivory Coast, Liberia, Sierra Leone, Togo	Size: {{{size}}} Habitat: {{{habitat}}} Diet: {{{hunting}}}	
Egyptian cobra	N. haje (Linnaeus, 1758)	Scattered areas across Africa	Size: {{{size}}} Habitat: {{{habitat}}} Diet: {{{hunting}}}	LC
Monocled cobra	N. kaouthia Lesson, 1831	South and Southeast Asia	Size: {{{size}}} Habitat: {{{habitat}}} Diet: {{{hunting}}}	LC
Mali cobra	N. katiensis Angel, 1922	Benin, Burkina Faso, Cameroon, Ghana, Guinea, the Ivory Coast, Mali, Gambia, Mauritania, Niger, Nigeria, Senegal, Togo	Size: {{{size}}} Habitat: {{{habitat}}} Diet: {{{hunting}}}	LC
Mandalay spitting cobra	N. mandalayensis Slowinski & Wüster, 2000	Myanmar	Size: {{{size}}} Habitat: {{{habitat}}} Diet: {{{hunting}}}	VU Unknown
Central African forest cobra	N. melanoleuca Hallowell, 1857	Sub-Saharan Africa	Size: {{{size}}} Habitat: {{{habitat}}} Diet: {{{hunting}}}	LC
Mozambique spitting cobra	N. mossambica W. Peters, 1854	Southern Africa	Size: {{{size}}} Habitat: {{{habitat}}} Diet: {{{hunting}}}	LC
Many-banded cobra	N. multifasciata (F. Werner, 1902)	Central Africa	Size: {{{size}}} Habitat: {{{habitat}}} Diet: {{{hunting}}}	LC
Indian cobra	N. naja (Linnaeus, 1758)	South Asia	Size: {{{size}}} Habitat: {{{habitat}}} Diet: {{{hunting}}}	LC
Dwarf water cobra	N. nana Collet & Trape, 2020	Democratic Republic of Congo	Size: {{{size}}} Habitat: {{{habitat}}} Diet: {{{hunting}}}	
Zebra spitting cobra	N. nigricincta Bogert, 1940 Two subspecies: N. n. nigricincta Bogert, 1940; N. n. woodi Pringle, 1955	Angola, Namibia, South Africa	Size: {{{size}}} Habitat: {{{habitat}}} Diet: {{{hunting}}}	LC
Black-necked spitting cobra	N. nigricollis Reinhardt, 1843	Sub-Saharan Africa	Size: {{{size}}} Habitat: {{{habitat}}} Diet: {{{hunting}}}	LC
Cape cobra	N. nivea (Linnaeus, 1758)	Southern Africa	Size: {{{size}}} Habitat: {{{habitat}}} Diet: {{{hunting}}}	LC
Nubian spitting cobra	N. nubiae Wüster & Broadley, 2003	Chad, Egypt, Eritrea, Niger, Sudan	Size: {{{size}}} Habitat: {{{habitat}}} Diet: {{{hunting}}}	LC
Obscure cobra	N. obscura Saleh & Trape, 2023	Egypt	Size: {{{size}}} Habitat: {{{habitat}}} Diet: {{{hunting}}}	
Caspian cobra	N. oxiana (Eichwald, 1831)	Afghanistan, northwestern India, Iran, Kyrgyzstan, Pakistan, Tajikistan, Turkmenistan, Uzbekistan	Size: {{{size}}} Habitat: {{{habitat}}} Diet: {{{hunting}}}	NT
Red spitting cobra	N. pallida Boulenger, 1896	Djibouti, Ethiopia, Kenya, Somalia, Tanzania	Size: {{{size}}} Habitat: {{{habitat}}} Diet: {{{hunting}}}	LC
São Tomé forest cobra	N. peroescobari Ceríaco, Marques, Schmitz & Bauer, 2017	São Tomé and Príncipe (São Tomé)	Size: {{{size}}} Habitat: {{{habitat}}} Diet: {{{hunting}}}	EN
Philippine cobra	N. philippinensis Taylor, 1922	Philippines (Luzon, Mindoro)	Size: {{{size}}} Habitat: {{{habitat}}} Diet: {{{hunting}}}	NT
Andaman cobra	N. sagittifera Wall, 1913	India (Andaman Islands)	Size: {{{size}}} Habitat: {{{habitat}}} Diet: {{{hunting}}}	EN
Samar cobra	N. samarensis W. Peters, 1861	Philippines (Mindanao, Bohol, Leyte, Samar, Camiguin)	Size: {{{size}}} Habitat: {{{habitat}}} Diet: {{{hunting}}}	LC
West African banded cobra	N. savannula Broadley, Trape, Chirio & Wüster, 2018	Benin, Burkina Faso, Cameroon, Chad, Gambia, Ghana, Guinea, the Ivory Coast, Mali, Niger, Nigeria, Senegal, Togo	Size: {{{size}}} Habitat: {{{habitat}}} Diet: {{{hunting}}}	LC
Senegalese cobra	N. senegalensis Trape, Chirio & Wüster, 2009	Benin, Burkina Faso, Ghana, Guinea, Guinea-Bissau, the Ivory Coast, Mali, Niger, Nigeria, Senegal	Size: {{{size}}} Habitat: {{{habitat}}} Diet: {{{hunting}}}	LC
Indochinese spitting cobra	N. siamensis Laurenti, 1768	Cambodia, Laos, Thailand, Vietnam	Size: {{{size}}} Habitat: {{{habitat}}} Diet: {{{hunting}}}	VU
Javan spitting cobra	N. sputatrix F. Boie, 1827	Indonesia (Java, Lesser Sunda Islands)	Size: {{{size}}} Habitat: {{{habitat}}} Diet: {{{hunting}}}	LC
Brown forest cobra	N. subfulva Laurent, 1955	Angola, Burundi, Cameroon, the Central African Republic, Chad, the Republic of Congo, the Democratic Republic of the Congo, Ethiopia, Kenya, Malawi, Mozambique, Nigeria, Rwanda, Somalia, South Africa, South Sudan, Tanzania, Uganda, Zambia, Zimbabwe	Size: {{{size}}} Habitat: {{{habitat}}} Diet: {{{hunting}}}	LC
Equatorial spitting cobra	N. sumatrana J. Müller, 1887	Southeast Asia	Size: {{{size}}} Habitat: {{{habitat}}} Diet: {{{hunting}}}	LC

- Nota bene: A binomial authority in parentheses indicates that the species was originally described in a genus other than Naja.

==== Fossil species ====
Genus Naja – Laurenti, 1768 – 3 extinct species
Species name	Image	Range	Size and ecology
N. antiqua Rage, 1976		Miocene Morocco	Size: Habitat:
N. iberica Szyndlar, 1985		Miocene Spain	Size: Habitat:
N. romani (Hofstetter, 1939)		Miocene France, Germany, Austria, Russia, Hungary, Greece and Ukraine	Size: Habitat:
