= Brown banded cobra =

Scientific classification
- Kingdom: Animalia
- Phylum: Chordata
- Class: Reptilia
- Order: Squamata
- Suborder: Serpentes
- Family: Elapidae
- Genus: Naja
- Species: N. fuxi

Binomial name
- Naja fuxi Shi, Vogel, Chen, & Ding, 2022

Naja fuxi, a species of cobra

The brown banded cobra (Naja fuxi) is a species of venomous cobra, endemic to Southeast Asia. It was considered to be a part of Naja kaouthia until genetic studies conducted in 2022 rendered it a separate species.

== Taxonomy ==
N. fuxi falls under the genus Naja in the family Elapidae. It was first accepted as a species of its own in a 2022 paper detailing the differences between the Asian cobras, wherein it was identified as a distinct taxon by some variations in patterning and scalation. The name fuxi is derived from Fuxi (伏羲), one of the ancestors of the human race in ancient Chinese mythology, often pictured as half-man, half-snake.

== Description ==
The brown banded cobra is a medium-sized species, with an adult body length of 69–137 cm (27–54 in). It resembles the monocled cobra, Naja kaouthia, due to the predominantly monocellate marking on its hood. The dominant colouration is brown, with varying shades across the length of the body. Juveniles and smaller specimens tend to have darker dorsal and ventral colouration than large adults. It may be differentiated from N. kaouthia by the regular narrow crossbands on the middle to hind regions of the dorsal scales, and by the dorsal surface of the tail which is buff with dark fringes.

=== Scalation ===
The brown banded cobra has 190 ventral scales, 2 pre-ventrals and 50 paired subcaudals tapering into a spine. Like its former conspecific, it has a smooth dorsum, with 20 neck and midbody rows and 15 one head-length ahead of the vent.

== Behaviour ==
This species has a wide range of prey, including amphibians, snakes, birds, and small mammals, and has been reported to enter human habitation in Yunnan Province to feed on chicks. Several individuals were found inhabiting abandoned termite nests during winter in Menglian County.

== Distribution and habitat ==
N. fuxi has been collected from tropical and subtropical regions of southwestern China, between 1,000–1,400 m (3,300–4,600 ft), and is likely found in neighbouring areas including the northern reaches of Myanmar, Laos, Thailand and Vietnam. It appears to prefer gentle slopes of open bush and forest edges.

== Venom ==
Not much is known about this species' venom. Its fangs are short and firm, as in other cobra species, but are not altered in a functional capacity to spew venom. It is an aggressive species, and was one of the most significant causes of snakebite in Xishuangbanna, Yunnan Province from 2007 to 2014.
