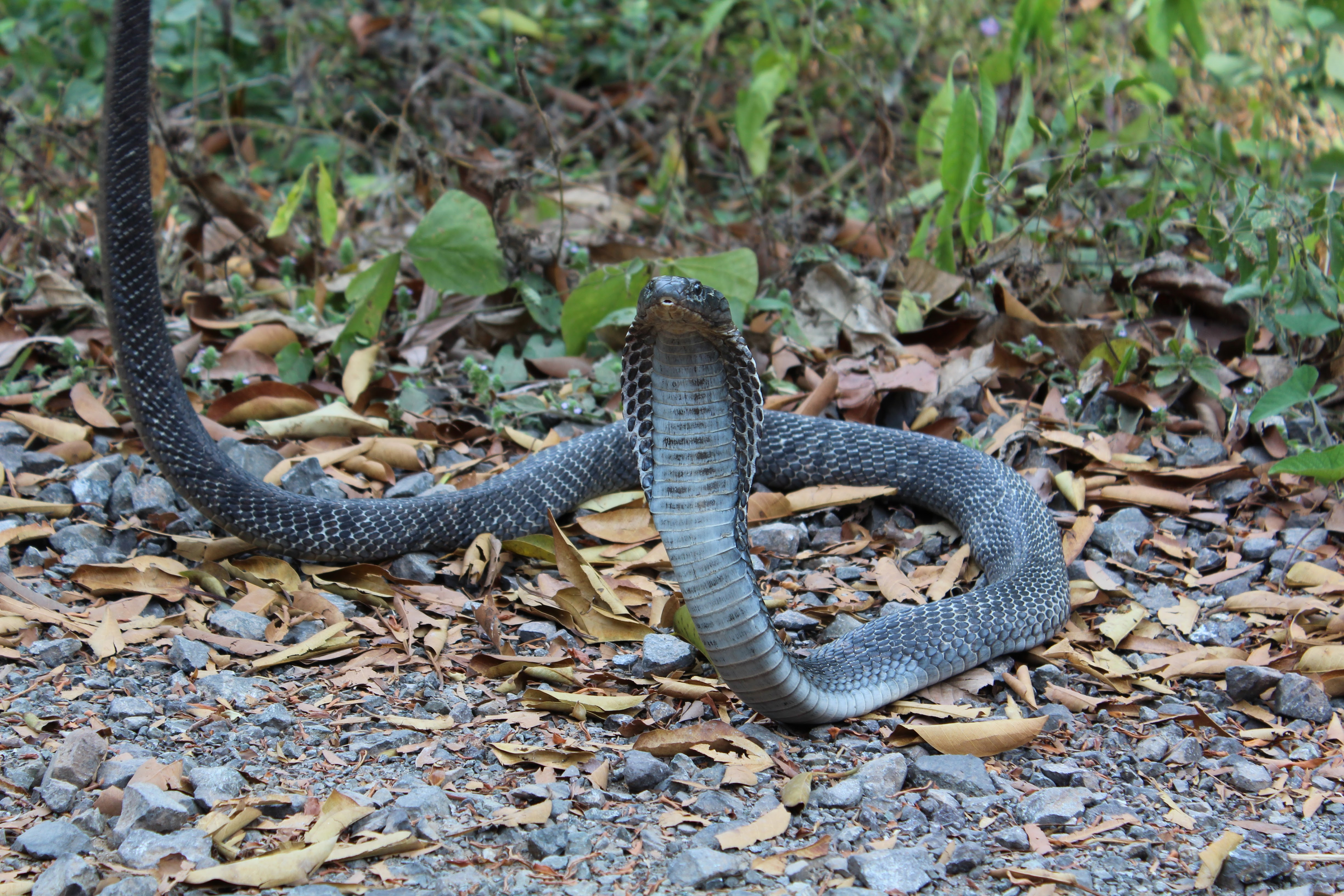

Conservation status
- Endangered (IUCN 3.1)
- CITES Appendix II

Scientific classification
- Kingdom: Animalia
- Phylum: Chordata
- Order: Squamata
- Suborder: Serpentes
- Family: Elapidae
- Genus: Naja
- Species: N. sagittifera

Binomial name
- Naja sagittifera Wall, 1913
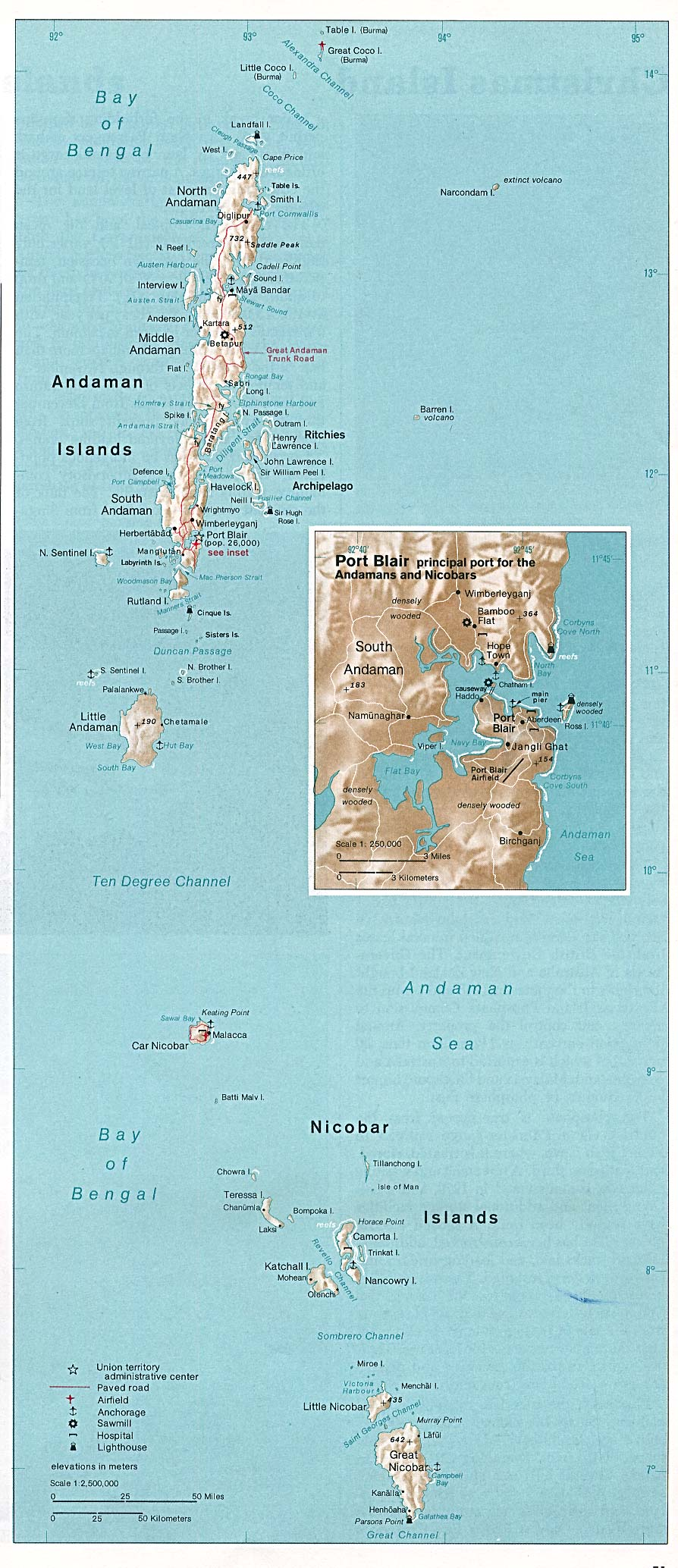
- Distribution of the Andaman cobra

= Andaman cobra =

Species of snake

The Andaman cobra or Andaman spitting cobra (Naja sagittifera) is a species of cobra endemic to the Andaman Islands of India. The name of this cobra comes from the Islands itself. The species has a very potent venom, and is capable of "spitting", although this defensive behavior is very rare and the aim is poor and not as efficient as "true spitting cobras".

== Taxonomy ==
Naja sagittifera is classified under the genus Naja of the family Elapidae. It was first described by Frank Wall, a British physician and herpetologist in 1913. The generic name Naja is a Latinization of the Sanskrit word nāgá (नाग), meaning "cobra". The specific epithet sagittifera is Latin and means "arrow-bearing" or "carrying arrows".

The Caspian cobra (Naja oxiana) and Monocled cobra (Naja kaouthia) have been demonstrated to be sister clades to Naja sagittifera. Noticeably, despite population separation caused by the Hindu Kush mountains, N. oxiana demonstrates a single evolutionary lineage, suggesting historic rapid range expansion. N. oxiana is a non-spitter unlike N. kaouthia and N. sagittifera.

== Description ==
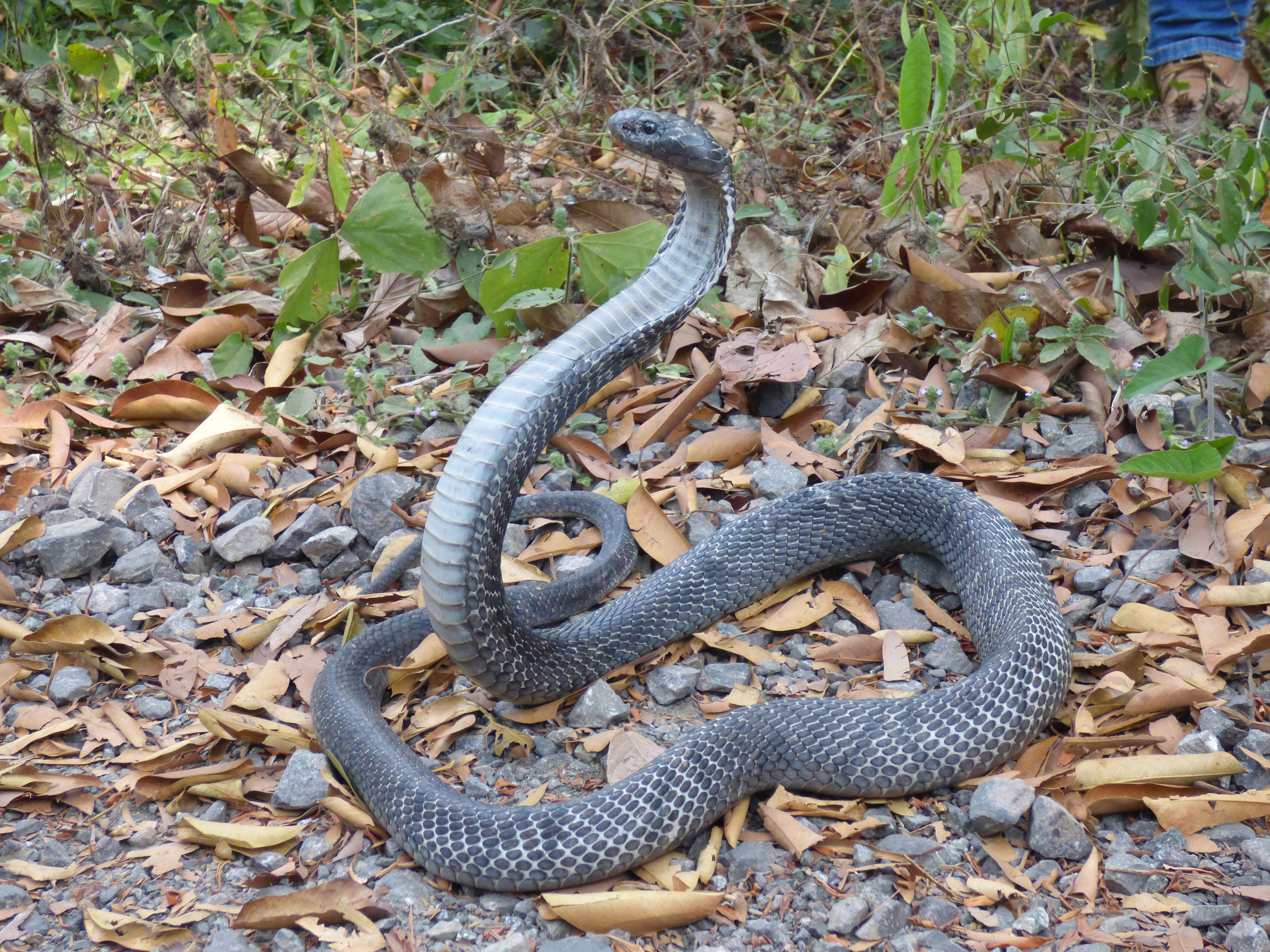
An Andaman cobra in a defensive posture

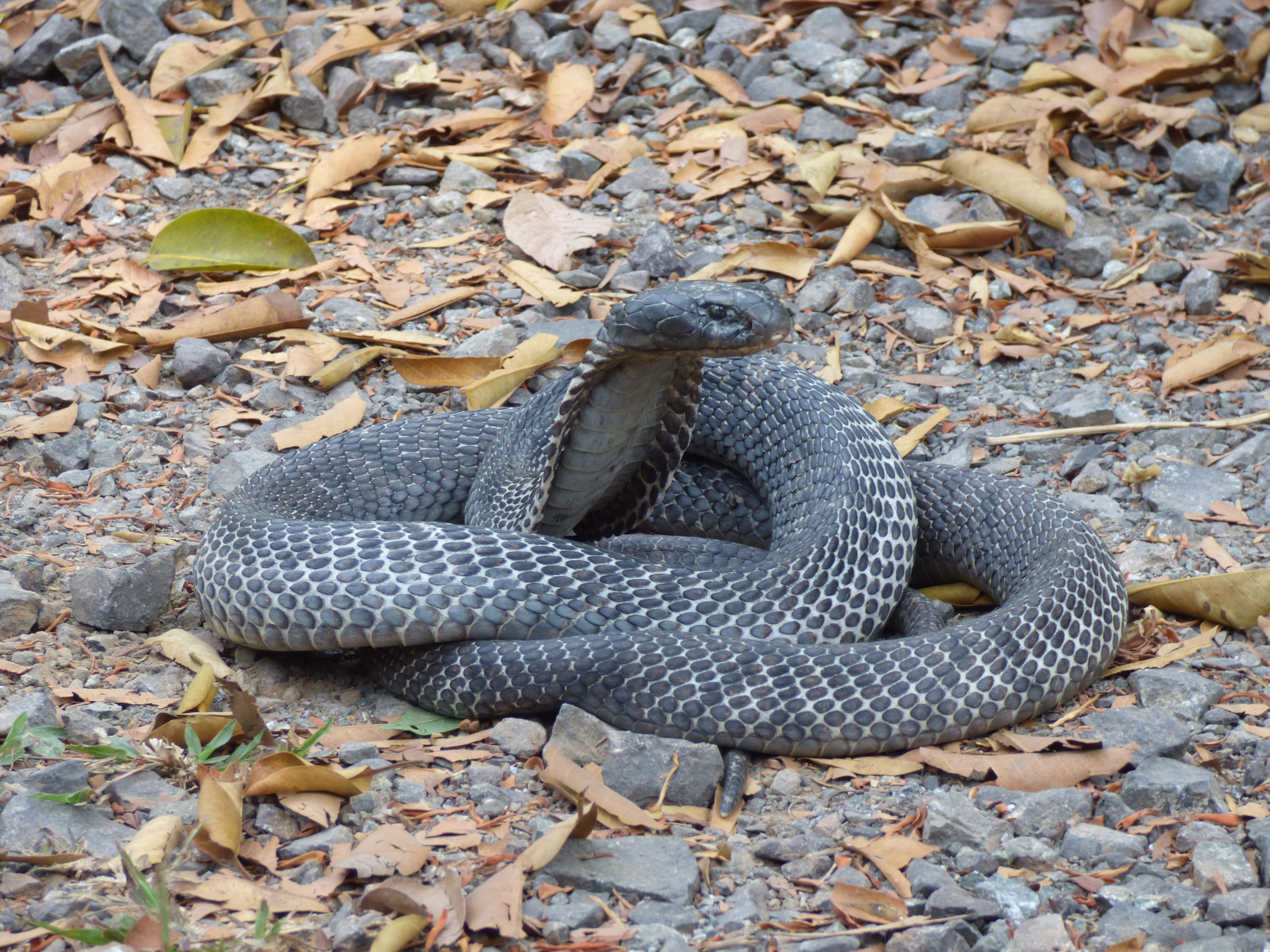
With its hood lowered

The Andaman cobra is medium to large sized snake in length, is a heavy bodied snake with long cervical ribs capable of expansion to form a hood when threatened, it may also spit its venom into the eyes, although not as accurately as the true spitting cobras. Body is compressed dorsoventrally and sub-cylindrical posteriorly. The average length of these snakes is about 0.9 metres (3.0 ft), but they can grow to about 1.5 metres (4.9 ft) regularly, although the longest specimen found measured 1.8 metres (5.9 ft). Adults come in three color patterns: a) Uniform glossy black above, with indistinct black monocle hood mark. Glossy dark-gray below. Head black, with pale white patches on shields. b) Light brown or creamish above, with indistinct black lines round the body and tail and indistinct black monocle hood mark, with brown centre. Pale brown below. Head light brown, spotted with black. c) Uniform grayish above, with distinct black narrow, irregular cross-bars on the body and tail and distinct black monocle hood mark, with gray centre. Grayish below. Head black, with pale white patches on shields. Juveniles have broad black cross-band on throat or underside of neck. Juveniles are glossy black above with a series of narrow, white, irregular cross-bars on body and tail, which show 'A' shape marks when seen from the side. There is a distinct white monocle mark, with black centre. Monocle mark becomes black with the age, also a broad white band below monocle mark disappears with age. Black below. Head black, with some shields blueish-white.

=== Scalation ===
Head broad, slightly distinct from neck. Eye medium, with round pupil; nostrils large; frontal small; no loreal; 1 preocular in contact with posterior nasal; 3 postoculars; temporals 2+1 or 2+2. Scales smooth, in 27-29 : 21-23 : 15-17 rows; supralabials 7 ( 3rd and 4th in contact with the eye ), 7th longest, elongated; cuneates 1 on each side; infralabials 8, first 4 touching the first pair of genials; ventrals 172–184; subcaudals 60–64, paired; anal entire.

== Distribution ==
This species is endemic to Andaman and Little Andaman Islands.

== Venom ==
Using WHO-recommended protocols, venom potencies of this species and its congener from mainland India (Naja naja) were evaluated in a murine model of envenoming. The results indicated that the LD_{50} of N. sagittifera venom was 0.475 mg/kg via intravenous injection.

Like N. kaouthia and N. atra, this isn't a "true spitting cobra". It may, in rare instances, eject venom. If venom gets into the eye, it can cause intense pain and blindness if left untreated. Cobras that cause both extensive & local effects, with or without flaccid paralysis, such as Naja kaouthia, generally cause a painful bite, with progressive swelling and, if necrosis develops, there is often discolouration of the skin and/or blistering first. This may progress to full thickness skin necrosis over 3–7 days. Such wounds may be extensive, can sometimes involve underlying tissues, and may be difficult to heal. There is a potential for both secondary infection and long term morbidity. Squamous cell carcinoma can develop in such long-term sores. In addition to these local effects, there may be systemic symptoms, such as headache, nausea, vomiting, abdominal pain and less commonly, evidence of mild, sometimes moderate to severe flaccid paralysis. This may develop within a few hours or be delayed (greater than 12 hrs before onset). Ptosis is usually the first sign, followed by ophthalmoplegia, then if it progresses, dysarthria, dysphagia, poor tongue extrusion, drooling, limb weakness, lastly respiratory paralysis. Relative rates of necrosis versus paralysis for Naja kaouthia vary between studies, but it appears necrosis will develop in about 10-40% of cases, while paralysis occurs in >50% of cases. Infection of the bite area is also common, as high as 58% of cases. Dry bites constitute roughly 20-40% of all bites.
