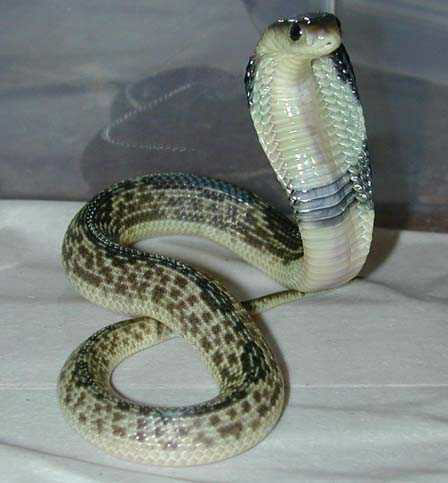

Conservation status
- Least Concern (IUCN 3.1)
- CITES Appendix II

Scientific classification
- Kingdom: Animalia
- Phylum: Chordata
- Class: Reptilia
- Order: Squamata
- Suborder: Serpentes
- Family: Elapidae
- Genus: Naja
- Species: N. sputatrix

Binomial name
- Naja sputatrix F. Boie, 1827
- Distribution of the Javan spitting cobra.

Synonyms
- Naja sputatrix F. Boie 1827; Naja leptocoryphaea Berthold, 1842; Naja tripudians var. sputatrix — Boulenger, 1896; Naia naja sputatrix — Stejneger, 1907; Naja tripudians sputatrix — de Rooij, 1917; Naja naja sputatrix — Kopstein, 1938; Naja kaouthia sputatrix (part) — Deraniyagala, 1960; Naja naja sputatrix — Harding & Welch, 1980; Naja sputatrix — Wüster & Thorpe, 1989; Naja sputatrix — Welch, 1994; Naja (Naja) sputatrix — Wallach et al., 2009; Naja sputatrix — Wallach et al., 2014

= Javan spitting cobra =

Species of snake

The Javan spitting cobra (Naja sputatrix), also called Indonesian cobra or Komodo spitting cobra, is a species of venomous cobra in the family Elapidae, found in the Lesser Sunda Islands of Indonesia, including Java, Bali, Lombok, Sumbawa, Flores, Komodo, and others.

== Etymology and names ==
Naja sputatrix is classified under the genus Naja of the family Elapidae. It was first described by German entomologist, herpetologist, ornithologist, and lawyer Friedrich Boie in 1827. The generic name Naja is a Latinisation of the Sanskrit word nāgá (नाग), meaning "cobra". The specific epithet sputatrix comes from the Latin word sputator, which means "spitter."

== Description ==
The Java spitting cobra is a medium to large sized snake and has long cervical ribs, capable of expanding to form a hood when threatened. The body of this species is compressed dorsoventrally and posteriorly cylindrical. The average length of an adult is 1.3 metres (4.3 ft), but they can grow to a maximum of around 1.85 metres (6.1 ft). The head is elliptical, slightly different from the neck with a short rounded snout and large nostrils. Its eyes are of moderate size, with round pupils. The dorsal scales are smooth and very oblique. Dorsal scale count is usually 25–19. Some colouration and pattern differences occur between Javan specimens and those from the other islands where this species occurs. Javan adults are usually uniform yellowish, brown or blackish in colour, while juveniles often have throat bands and lateral throat spots. Specimens do not always have hood marks, but when there is a mark, it is most often chevron-shaped.

== Distribution ==
This species of cobra is native to the Indonesian islands of Java and the Lesser Sunda Islands of Bali, Lombok, Sumbawa, Komodo, Flores, Lomblen, and Alor. They may possibly occur in the other islands in the group. One was found on Rinca Island on 26 December 2015. Verification is still required as to whether or not this species of cobra also occurs in the islands of Timor and Sulawesi. Although a single specimen was observed in the island of Sulawesi, it is thought that the specimen may have originated from the island of Java, as it was indistinguishable from Javan specimens. Scientist De Hass did research on this species in two districts of western Java: in Nandjoeng Djaja, where it was relatively uncommon and in Bandjarwangi, where the altitude is 900 metres (3,000 ft) it was not recorded. A 1998 study by FB Yuwono found the species was abundant in Java. Dunn (1927b) reported specimens taken on Komodo from sea level to 650 metres (2,130 ft), the highest altitude this species has been found at.

== Habitat, behaviour and ecology ==
The Javan spitting cobra is found mostly in tropical forests and wet forest, but the species adapts well to a wide variety of habitats across its range on the islands, including more arid regions, dry woodlands, and cultivated hill country. In the island of Komodo, it has been observed in a variety of habitats including dry savanna and deciduous monsoon forest. It has also been reported that specimens in the island of Komodo are reluctant to spit, but field observations suggest the opposite. This species is easy prey for the Komodo dragon. Naja sputatrix is very defensive and readily spits out venom when it feels threatened. It is a terrestrial snake that's nocturnal in nature. It preys predominantly on small mammals such as small rats and mice, but it will also feed on frogs, other snakes, and lizards. Herpetologist Shine Boeadi, in a study published in 1998, measured and dissected 80 Javan specimens of this species and found that most prey items were mammals.

== Reproduction ==
Mating occurs during the dry season (August to October). Females often lay eggs at the end of the dry season in November or the very beginning of the wet season. As many as 13 to 19 eggs may be laid in a clutch, the average is about 16 eggs. Javan females may produce and lay up to 36 eggs, but on average only 25 eggs are produced. The incubation period is about 88 days according to Kopstein. Like other elapids, hatchlings are completely independent from birth.

== Conservation status ==
This species is listed as Appendix II by CITES meaning this species is not threatened with extinction, but may become so unless trade in specimens of such species is subject to strict regulation in order to avoid utilization incompatible with the survival of the species in the wild. They are commonly harvested for their skins. They are also occasionally found in the pet trade.

== Venom ==
The LD_{50} or (median lethal dose) of the crude venom of this species is 0.90 mg/kg IV (0.59-1.36 mg/kg). The most significant constituents of the venom include high-molecular-weight proteins and enzymes, phospholipase A2 enzymes, postsynaptic neurotoxins and polypeptide cardiotoxins, meaning although the venom may be potent, it may not be particularly rapid-acting. Like all cobra species, this species' venom also consists of postsynaptic neurotoxins. However, the main components of its venom are cardiotoxins with cytotoxic activity. In fact, polypeptide cardiotoxins make up 60% of the venom (dry weight), while postsynaptic neurotoxins make up only 4.5%. The two main neurotoxins, sputa-neurotoxin 1 (SN1) and sputa-neurotoxin 2 (SN2) isolated from the venom, are "short" neurotoxins, with 62 and 61 amino acid residues, respectively. The IV LD_{50} of the two toxins are 0.09 mg/g and 0.07 mg/g, respectively, and they possess amino acid sequences similar to those of other cobra venom neurotoxins. The venom was also found to exhibit an in vitro anticoagulant activity much stronger than most common cobra (genus Naja) venoms. The anticoagulants, phospholipase A2 enzymes, with a molecular weight of approximately 14 kDa, make up 15% of the venom (dry weight). Very few human fatalities are attributed to this species.
