= Lycodon cardamomensis =

Conservation status
- Data Deficient (IUCN 3.1)

Scientific classification
- Kingdom: Animalia
- Phylum: Chordata
- Class: Reptilia
- Order: Squamata
- Suborder: Serpentes
- Family: Colubridae
- Genus: Lycodon
- Species: L. cardamomensis

Binomial name
- Lycodon cardamomensis Daltry & Wüster, 2002

Species of snake

Lycodon cardamomensis, also known as the Cardamom Mountains wolf snake, is a species of nonvenomous colubrid snake found in south-western Cambodia and eastern Thailand.

== Etymology ==
Lycodon cardamomensis is named for the Cardamom hills in south-western Cambodia, the region from which the type specimen was collected.

== Description ==
The head of the snake is clearly differentiated from the neck, and flattened slightly. The nose protrudes beyond the lower jaw. The eyes are vertical ellipses. The body is rounded above, and flat on the belly. A holotype for the species had a snout-to-vent length of 25.2 centimeters, and a tail-length of 6.4 centimeters, giving it a total length of 31.6 centimeters.

The body of the snake is black on the back and tail, with 12 white stripes across the back and six across the tail. The stripes are 3-5 scales wide along the top, widening to 5-9 scales on the sides. The first two bands are completely black, while the rest have black speckles on them. The top of the head is black with lighter markings, while the underside of the head and body is white.

== Reproduction ==
Lycodon cardamomensis is oviparous, or egg-laying.

== Phylogeny ==
Lycodon cardamomensis is a member of the genus Lycodon, a genus of snakes commonly known as wolf snakes. The genus belongs to the snake family Colubridae, the largest snake family, with member species being found on every continent except Antarctica.

== Habitat & ecology ==
L. cardamomensis is a terrestrial nocturnal species, which has been observed in both primary and secondary forest. It has been observed at altitudes of between 500 and 700 meters above sea level.

== Distribution ==
L. cardamomensis has been observed in Pursat Province of Cambodia, as well as in Eastern Thailand. It is thought to be endemic to the Cardamom Hills of that region. Erroneous records exist from the highlands of Vietnam, as well as some records from the same region that have yet to be verified.

== Conservation ==
The range of the species overlaps with the protected area of the Phnom Samkos Wildlife Sanctuary, but no species-specific conservation measures exist. The species might be under threat from logging and forest degradation in its range, as well as from hunting by individuals who mistake it for the venomous Malayan krait; however, the impacts of these potential threats are currently unknown. The International Union for Conservation of Nature lists it as "Data deficient" due to the small number of specimens observed, and the lack of knowledge of its response to logging and hunting.
