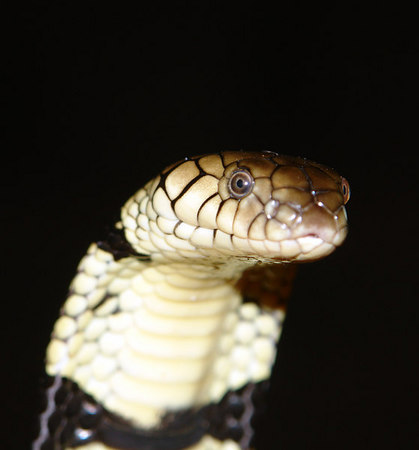

Conservation status
- Least Concern (IUCN 3.1)

Scientific classification
- Kingdom: Animalia
- Phylum: Chordata
- Class: Reptilia
- Order: Squamata
- Suborder: Serpentes
- Family: Elapidae
- Genus: Naja
- Subgenus: Boulengerina
- Species: N. annulata

Binomial name
- Naja annulata Peters, 1876
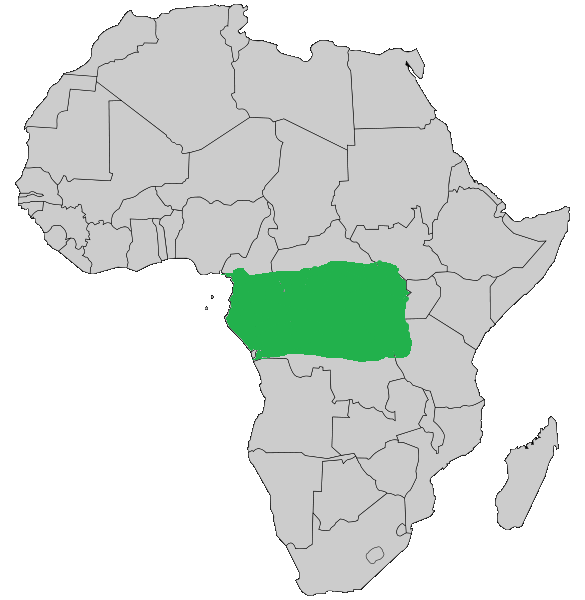

Synonyms
- Aspidelaps bocagei Sauvage, 1884; Boulengerina annulata — Schmidt, 1923

= Naja annulata =

Species of snake

Naja annulata (formerly Boulengerina annulata), commonly known as the banded water cobra or the ringed water cobra, is a species of water cobra native to western and central Africa.

The species is one of the two species of water cobra in the world, the other one being the Congo water cobra (Naja christyi).

== Description ==
It is a large, heavy-bodied snake with a short, broad and flat head with an indistinct canthus and distinct from the neck. It has medium-sized dark eyes with round pupils. The body is cylindrical; the tail is long. The scales are smooth and glossy, in 21–23 rows at midbody. Adults grow to an average of 1.4 to 2.2 metres (4.6 to 7.2 ft) in length, but they can grow to a maximum of 2.8 metres (9.2 ft). Scales are smooth, indicating the largely aquatic life of this species. It is capable of spreading a narrow, yet impressive hood. Body colors are mostly glossy brown, grayish-brown, or reddish-brown with black bands all along the body. The belly is pale yellow, while the tail is wholly black.

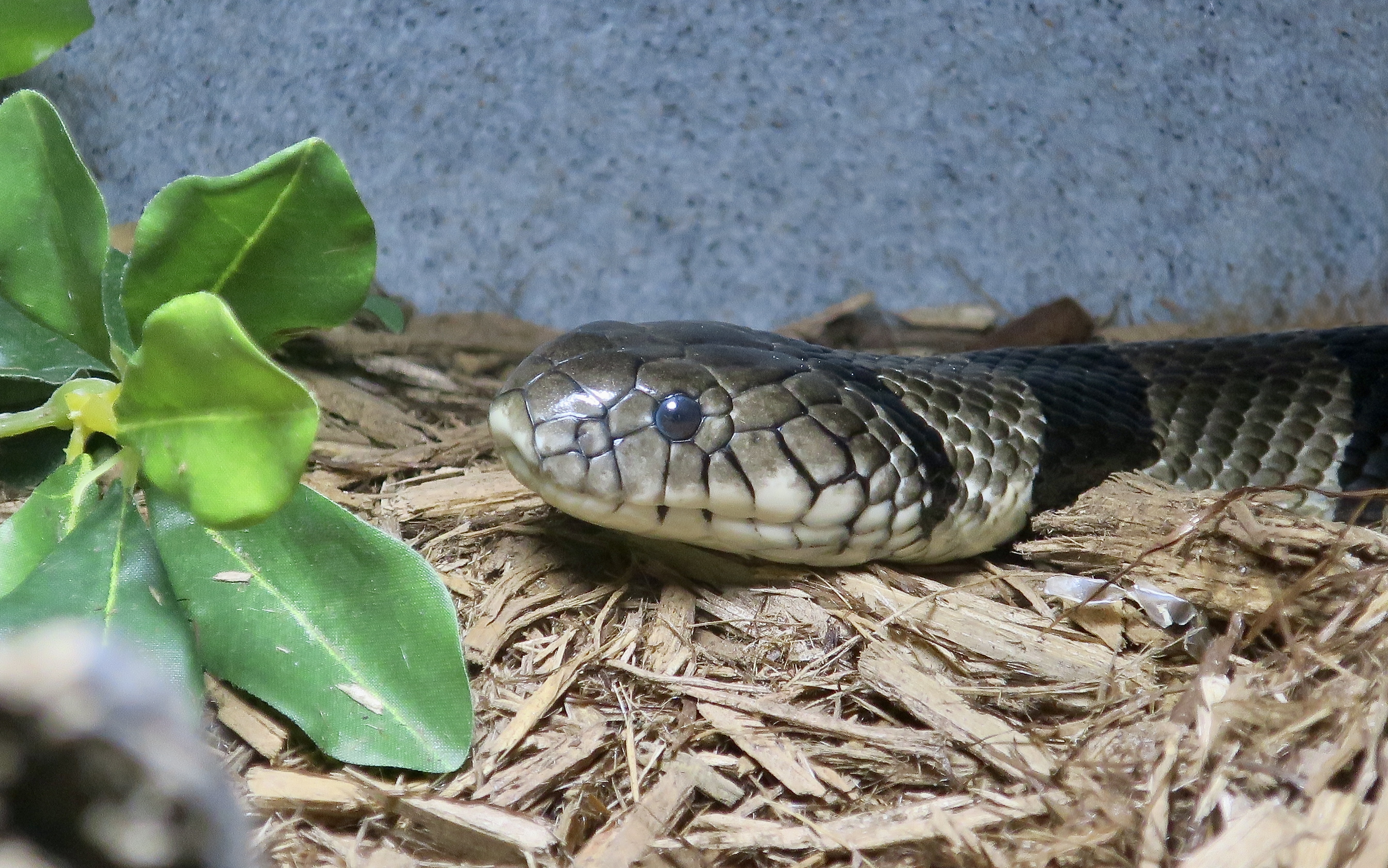
A banded water cobra at Phoenix Herpetological Sanctuary.

== Distribution and habitat ==
This species is found in parts of central and western Africa, in Burundi, Cameroon, Central African Republic, Democratic Republic of Congo, Republic of Congo, Equatorial Guinea, Gabon, Rwanda, and the province of Cabinda in Angola, as well as along the Burundian, Tanzanian and Zambian shores of Lake Tanganyika. It is largely an aquatic species and rarely is found far away from water. It can be found along lakes and rivers in forested and well-wooded savanna terrain where cover is sufficient, most commonly along lowland forested, bushy or wooded banks of lakes, rivers, and streams.

== Behavior and diet ==
It is a secretive species and is seldom encountered by humans. It is active by day and night, though it is usually more active by day. This largely aquatic snake spends most of its time in the water. It is an excellent swimmer and is capable of remaining underwater for up to 10 minutes and diving to depths of 25 m (82 ft). It is a slow mover on land, and it tends to hide among rocks, in holes, or overhanging tree roots at the shoreline. It also makes use of any man-made structures, such as bridges and jetties, to hide. It is generally not aggressive, and if approached in water, it will swim away swiftly and on land will attempt to escape into water. If threatened on land, it will rear up and spread its narrow, yet prominent hood and it may hiss loudly, but it tends not to make any forward movements. It will only bite when provoked.

It preys almost exclusively on fish. It may also prey on frogs, toads, and other amphibians.

== Venom ==
The venom of this species is not well studied, but it is believed that the venom is dangerously neurotoxic, like that of most elapids. A study listed the intraperitoneal (IP) LD_{50} of this species at 0.143 mg/kg.

Venoms of the water cobras were assayed for lethality, proteolytic activity and protein content. Naja annulata annulata and Naja christyi venoms averaged 89% protein and lacked proteolytic activity. The murine intraperitoneal LD_{50} of N. a. annulata and N. christyi venoms were 0.143 and 0.120 mg/kg, respectively. Polyvalent antivenom produced by the South African Institute of Medical Research neutralized 575 and 200 LD_{50} of N. a. annulata and N. christyi venoms/ml antivenom, respectively. Cation exchange chromatography resolved four lethal peaks from N. a. annulata venom and six lethal peaks from N. christyi venom. The major lethal peaks (about 12% of total venom protein) were purified further with molecular sieve chromatography and were characterized as 61- (N. a. annulata toxin) and 62-residue (N. christyi toxin) polypeptides with four half-cystines. Elucidation of the complete amino-acid sequences indicated that these toxins belonged to the short-chain class of postsynaptic neurotoxins. Short-chain neurotoxins 1 from N. a. annulata and N. christyi had murine intraperitoneal LD_{50} values of 0.052 and 0.083 mg/kg, respectively, and showed over 80% homology with N. nigricollis alpha toxin. Reverse-phase analysis of another peak present in both venoms resolved a toxin that had an N-terminus identical to N. christyi short-chain neurotoxin 1. These fractions also contained toxins readily separable from the short-chain isotoxin by preparative reverse-phase chromatography. Amino-acid sequencing of the first 28 residues indicated that both toxins were long-chain neurotoxins with identical N-termini. The LD_{50} of long-chain neurotoxins 2 from N. a. annulata and N. christyi venoms were 0.086 and 0.090 mg/kg, respectively. The venoms of these little-known elapids have some of the lowest intraperitoneal LD_{50} values of any African Naja species studied thus far, and have high concentrations of potent postsynaptic neurotoxins.

== Taxonomy ==
Subspecies	Taxon author	Common name	Geographic range
N. a. annulata	Buchholz and Peters, 1876	Banded water cobra, ringed water cobra	Cameroon, Central African Republic, Democratic Republic of Congo, Republic of Congo, Equatorial Guinea, Gabon, Rwanda, Cabinda
N. a. stormsi	(Dollo, 1886)	Storm's water cobra	Burundi, Tanzania
