= Naja christyi =

Conservation status
- Least Concern (IUCN 3.1)

Scientific classification
- Kingdom: Animalia
- Phylum: Chordata
- Class: Reptilia
- Order: Squamata
- Suborder: Serpentes
- Family: Elapidae
- Genus: Naja
- Subgenus: Boulengerina
- Species: N. christyi

Binomial name
- Naja christyi (Boulenger, 1904)
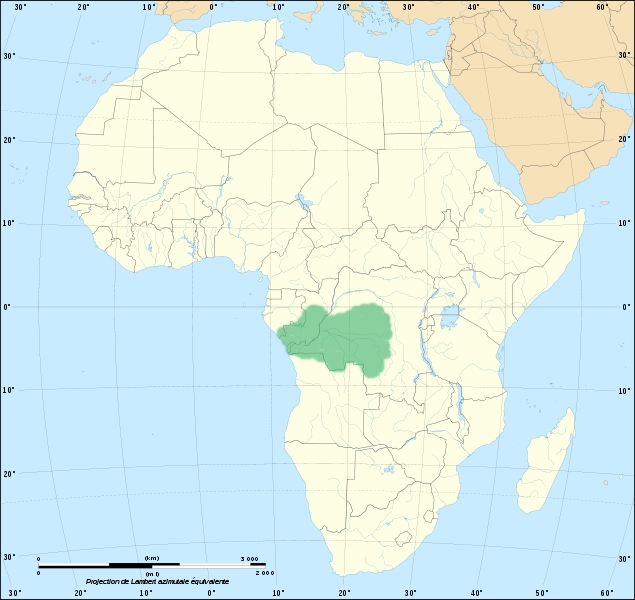
- Distribution of Naja christyi

Synonyms
- Boulengerina christyi Boulenger, 1904; Limnonaja christyi — K.P. Schmidt, 1923; Boulengerina christyi — Welch, 1994; Naja christyi — Wüster et al., 2007; Naja (Boulengerina) christyi — Wallach et al., 2009; Boulengerina christyi — Wallach et al., 2014

Species of snake

Naja christyi (formerly Boulengerina christyi), commonly known as the Congo water cobra or Christy's water cobra, is a species of venomous snakes belonging to the family Elapidae. The species is native to Sub-Saharan Africa.

This species was formerly in the genus Boulengerina, but more recent research by Wallach et al. has shown that Boulengerina is actually a subgenus and Boulengerina christyi is a synonym of Naja christyi. This species has no known subspecies.

== Etymology ==
Naja christyi was first described by Belgian-British zoologist George Albert Boulenger in 1904. The generic name Naja is a Latinisation of the Sanskrit word nāgá (नाग) meaning "cobra".

The specific epithet, christyi, is in honor of Dr. Cuthbert Christy, who led several biological expeditions to the Democratic Republic of the Congo.

== Description ==
N. christyi is a medium to moderately long, somewhat compressed, moderately slender-bodied, but heavily built snake, with a medium length tapering tail. The head is short, with an indistinct canthus, and is distinct from the neck. The neck is capable of being spread into a hood. The eyes are relatively small in size with round pupils. The dorsal scales are smooth and shiny. The average total length (including tail) of an adult specimen is around 1.1 metres (3.6 ft), but it may grow to upwards of 2.3 metres (7.5 ft) The rostral is once and a half as broad as deep, and is just visible from above. The internasals are as long as the prefrontals, and are extensively in contact with the preocular. The frontal is small, not longer than broad, broadest behind, forming very open angles in front and behind, not quite as long as its distance from the rostral, half as long as the parietals. The supraocular is much narrower than the frontal. The posterior nasal is in contact with the single preocular. There are two or three postoculars. The temporals are 2+2 or 2+3. There are seven upper labials, the third and fourth entering the eye, the fourth and fifth in contact with the lower postocular. There are four lower labials in contact with the anterior chin shields. The posterior chin shields are narrower and a little shorter than the anterior chin shields and separated by one scale. The dorsal scales are in 19 rows on the neck, and in 17 rows at midbody. The ventrals number 221. The anal is entire. The subcaudals number 70. Colouration is blackish brown above. The nape and the anterior third of the body have irregular pale brown and black cross bars, the black forming rings on the neck. The upper lip is pale brown, with black lines on the sutures between the shields. The lower surface of the head is brownish white. The belly and the ventral surface of the tail are blackish.

== Distribution and habitat ==
N. christyi has a small geographic range. It occurs in western Democratic Republic of Congo, the southern half of the Republic of Congo, a very small portion of southeastern Gabon, and in the province of Cabinda in far northern Angola. N. christyi is found most commonly in or near water, in lowland bushy or wooded areas along banks of lakes, rivers, and streams. It is limited to the lower Congo River and nearby wet forested areas.

== Behavior ==
Not much is known about N. christyi. However, it is believed to be active by day and night. It is a semi-aquatic snake which spends much of its time in the water. An excellent swimmer. It tends to hide amongst rocks, in holes or overhanging tree roots at the shore line. It also makes use of any man-made structures such as bridges and jetties to hide. Generally this is not an aggressive snake, so bites are rare. If approached in water it will swim away swiftly. If threatened on land it will rear up, spread its narrow hood and hiss. It may strike if it's provoked extensively.

== Reproduction ==
N. christyi is an oviparous species, but mating season and number of eggs laid is not known.

== Diet ==
N. christyi predominately preys upon fish and amphibians, but it will also prey upon small lizards and rodents if the opportunity is there.

== Venom ==
The venom of N. christyi is not well studied, but it is believed that the venom is dangerously neurotoxic, like that of most elapids. A study listed the intraperitoneal (IP) LD_{50} of this species at 0.12 mg/kg. At least one human has been reported to have been bitten by this species. The individual had only mild symptoms (headache, local pain), but this species is capable of causing serious envenomation of humans. No specific antivenom currently produced against this species' venom.

Venoms of the water cobras, were assayed for lethality, proteolytic activity and protein content. Naja annulata annulata and Naja christyi venoms averaged 89% protein and lacked proteolytic activity. The murine intraperitoneal LD_{50} of N. a. annulata and N. christyi venoms were 0.143 and 0.120 mg/kg, respectively. Polyvalent antivenom produced by the South African Institute of Medical Research neutralized 575 and 200 LD_{50} of N. a. annulata and N. christyi venoms/ml antivenom, respectively. Cation exchange chromatography resolved four lethal peaks from N. a. annulata venom and six lethal peaks from N. christyi venom. The major lethal peaks (about 12% of total venom protein) were purified further with molecular sieve chromatography and were characterized as 61 (N. a. annulata toxin) and 62 (N. christyi toxin) residue polypeptides with four half-cystines. Elucidation of the complete amino acid sequences indicated that these toxins belonged to the short-chain class of postsynaptic neurotoxins. Short-chain neurotoxins 1 from N. a. annulata and N. christyi had murine intraperitoneal LD_{50} of 0.052 and 0.083 mg/kg, respectively, and showed over 80% homology with N. nigricollis alpha toxin. Reverse-phase analysis of another peak present in both venoms resolved a toxin that had an N-terminus identical to N. christyi short-chain neurotoxin 1. These fractions also contained toxins readily separable from the short-chain isotoxin by preparative reverse-phase chromatography. Amino acid sequencing of the first 28 residues indicated that both toxins were long-chain neurotoxins with identical N-termini. The LD_{50} of long-chain neurotoxins 2 from N. a. annulata and N. christyi venoms were 0.086 and 0.090 mg/kg, respectively. The venoms of these little-known elapids have the lowest intraperitoneal LD_{50} of any African Naja species studied thus far and have high concentrations of potent postsynaptic neurotoxins.
