= Philippine cobra =

Conservation status
- Near Threatened (IUCN 3.1)
- CITES Appendix II

Scientific classification
- Kingdom: Animalia
- Phylum: Chordata
- Class: Reptilia
- Order: Squamata
- Suborder: Serpentes
- Family: Elapidae
- Genus: Naja; Laurenti, 1768
- Species: N. philippinensis

Binomial name
- Naja philippinensis Taylor, 1922
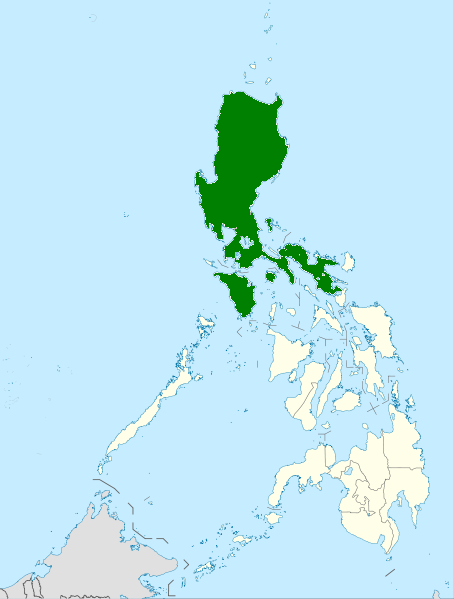
- Distribution of the Philippine cobra

Species of snake

The Philippine cobra (Naja philippinensis) also called Philippine spitting cobra or northern Philippine cobra, is a stocky, highly venomous species of spitting cobra native to the northern regions of the Philippines. The Philippine cobra is called ulupong in Tagalog, carasaen in Ilocano.

== Taxonomy ==
Naja philippinensis was described by American herpetologist Edward Harrison Taylor in 1922. The generic name naja is a Latinisation of the Sanskrit word nāgá (नाग) meaning "cobra". The specific epithet philippinensis is Latin and literally means "from the Philippine Islands".

== Description ==
The Philippine cobra is a stocky snake of medium length with long cervical ribs capable of expanding, so when threatened, a hood can be formed. Only the female specimens have been reported to spit, this with up to 3m away. The average length of this species is 1.0 metre (3.3 ft). The species can grow to lengths of 1.6 metres (5.2 ft) However, subpopulations of the species, particularly specimens from Mindoro Island, are said to attain lengths of 2 metres (6.6 ft), but these are unconfirmed claims. If true, however, 2 m would be very rare and would be considered the absolute maximum for this species. The head is elliptical, depressed, slightly distinct from neck with a short, rounded snout and large nostrils. The eyes are moderate in size with dark brown and round pupils, typical of other cobra species and similar to other elapids in general. It has a fairly stocky build for an elapid, and adult snakes are uniformly light to medium brown, while the juveniles tend to be a darker brown in color. They have 23-27 scale rows around the neck and 21 just above the middle part of the body; 182-193 ventrals, 36-49 subcaudals, and basal pairs are sometimes undivided.

=== Scalation ===
There are 23-27 (usually 25) scale rows around neck, 21 (rarely 23) just ahead of mid-body; 182-193 ventrals, 36-49 subcaudals, basal pairs sometimes undivided.

== Distribution and habitat ==
The Philippine cobra occurs mostly in the northern regions of the Philippines. They can be found on the islands of Luzon, Mindoro, Catanduanes, and Masbate. This species likely may occur in other neighboring islands, but this remains unconfirmed. Records from the Calamianes group and Palawan require confirmation.

The Philippine cobra's habitat include low-lying plains and forested regions, along with open fields, grasslands, dense jungle, agricultural fields, and human settlements. This species of cobra is particularly fond of water, so it can be found very close to ponds, rivers, or large puddles of water.

== Diet ==
This species feeds predominantly on small mammals, frogs, and even other snakes. Small rodents such as mice and small rats are their preferred prey and make up the majority of their diets. However, they will also eat other sizable snakes, small lizards, frogs, eggs, and when the opportunity arises, small birds.

== Predators ==
Predators of this species include humans, birds of prey, the king cobra, and the mongoose. Large rats that have been bitten by this snake and are in a position to fight back, often do so. Although rare, large rats have been known to fatally wound the snake by scratching, biting, or even poking one or both of the snake's eyes out. Of course, the rat ends up succumbing to the venom, but the snake will often sustain eye injury, potentially becoming blind, and severe bites to the snout region leave the snake vulnerable to infections and diseases.

== Venom ==
Although venom toxicity values can vary greatly even among specimens of the same species, the Philippine cobra is considered to possess one of the more toxic venoms among the Naja (cobra) species. According to Tan et al., the murine LD_{50} via the IV route for this species is 0.18 mg/kg (0.11-0.3 mg/kg). Data on venom yield of 150 milked N. philippinensis specimens (69 males; 81 females) gave an overall average venom yield per cobra per extraction of 0.33 ml (wet) or 70.1 mg (dried).

The venom of the Philippine cobra is a potent postsynaptic neurotoxin which affects respiratory function and can cause neurotoxicity and respiratory paralysis, as the neurotoxins interrupt the transmission of nerve signals by binding to the neuromuscular junctions near the muscles. Research has shown its venom is purely a neurotoxin, with no apparent necrotizing components and no cardiotoxins. These snakes are capable of accurately spitting their venom at a target up to 3 metres (9.8 ft) away. The symptoms of a bite might include headache, nausea, vomiting, abdominal pain, diarrhea, dizziness, and difficulty breathing. Bites by the Philippine cobra produce prominent neurotoxicity with minimal to no local signs. A study of 39 patients envenomed by the Philippine cobra was conducted in 1988. Neurotoxicity occurred in 38 cases and was the predominant clinical feature. Complete Respiratory failure developed in 19 patients, and was often rapid in onset; in three cases, apnea occurred within just 30 minutes of the bite. There were two deaths, both in patients who were moribund upon arrival at the hospital. Three patients developed necrosis, and 14 individuals with systemic symptoms had no local swelling at all. Both cardiotoxicity and reliable nonspecific signs of envenoming were absent. Bites by the Philippine cobra produce a distinctive clinical picture characterized by severe neurotoxicity of rapid onset and minimal local tissue damage.
