= Nubian spitting cobra =

Naja nubiae

Conservation status
- Least Concern (IUCN 3.1)

Scientific classification
- Kingdom: Animalia
- Phylum: Chordata
- Class: Reptilia
- Order: Squamata
- Suborder: Serpentes
- Family: Elapidae
- Genus: Naja
- Species: N. nubiae

Binomial name
- Naja nubiae Wüster & Broadley, 2003
- Nubian spitting cobra distribution

Species of snake

The Nubian spitting cobra or Egyptian spitting cobra (Naja nubiae) is a species of spitting cobra native to Africa.

== Description ==
A relatively small spitting cobra. Maximum recorded length 148 cm. In 2024, a specimen hunted from Luxor Egypt reached 180 cm. Colour and pattern: Brownish-grey overall, scale bases and skin between scales black. Belly slightly lighter. Dark band across nape, dark ring across throat and neck, usually an additional dark band on belly, bands may fade with age. Scalation: 207–226 ventrals, 58–72 subcaudals, 23–29 scale rows around neck, 23–27 scale rows at midbody, 1–2 preoculars, 6–8 supralabials.

== Distribution ==
A scattered distribution in north-eastern Africa: Egypt (Nile Valley), Sudan (Nile Valley, Darfur), western Eritrea, Chad (Ennedi Plateau) and Niger (Aïr Mountains).

== Taxonomy ==
It was previously confused with the red spitting cobra (Naja pallida), but was distinguished based on detailed morphological and mitochondrial DNA analysis.
