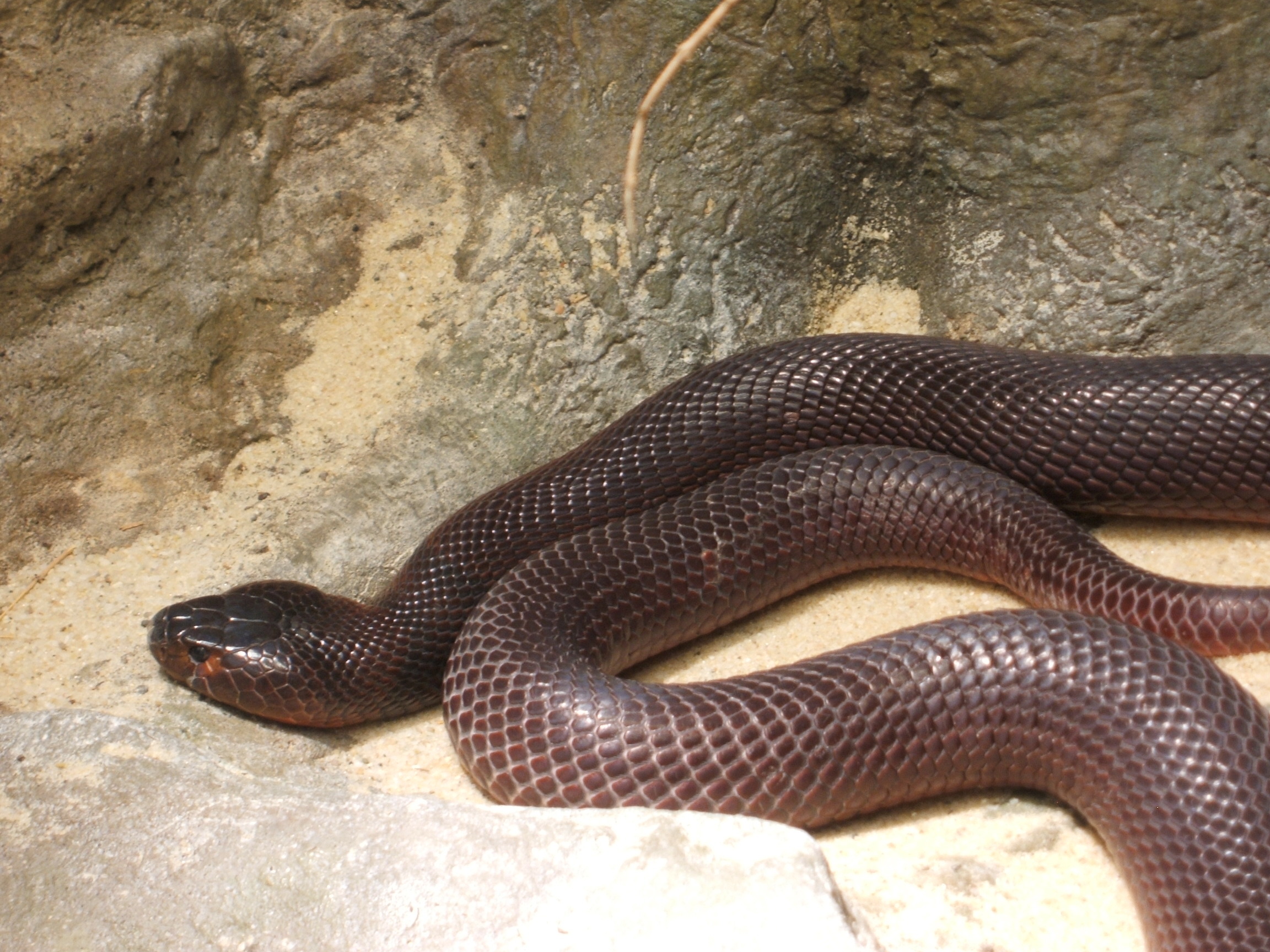

Conservation status
- Least Concern (IUCN 3.1)

Scientific classification
- Kingdom: Animalia
- Phylum: Chordata
- Class: Reptilia
- Order: Squamata
- Suborder: Serpentes
- Family: Elapidae
- Genus: Naja
- Subgenus: Afronaja
- Species: N. pallida

Binomial name
- Naja pallida Boulenger, 1896

Synonyms
- Naja nigricollis pallida Boulenger, 1896

= Red spitting cobra =

Species of snake

The red spitting cobra (Naja pallida) is a species of spitting cobra native to Africa.

== Description ==
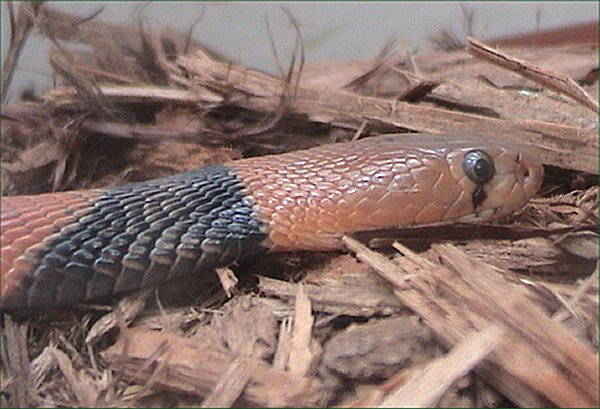
Juvenile N. pallida: note the black throat band, in contrast to adult coloration

This medium-sized cobra attains lengths between 0.7 and 1.2 metres (2 and 4 ft), but may grow to a maximum length of around 1.5 metres (5 ft) in very rare cases. It is often thought of as an attractive species; it is usually bright salmon-red contrasted with a broad black throat band and subocular teardrop markings. However, the colour of this species does vary, which usually depends on where in Africa a particular specimen is found. For example, specimens from southern Kenya and northern Tanzania have an orange-red colour, with a broad, dark blue or black throat band. Some specimens may have two or three throat bands, but this is uncommon for specimens from East Africa. The ventral side is also reddish in colour, sometimes the throat area may be a creamy white. Specimens from other areas can be yellow, pinkish, pink-grey, pale red or steel grey. Most specimens will have a throat band, but it will fade or even sometimes disappear in larger adults. The true red specimens will become reddish-brown in colour as they age and grow in size. The body of this snake is slightly depressed, tapered and moderately slender with a medium-length tail. It is slightly compressed dorsoventrally and subcylindrical posteriorly. The head is broad, flattened and slightly distinct from the neck. The canthus is distinct and the snout is rounded. The eyes are medium to large in size with round pupils. Dorsal scales are smooth and strongly oblique.

=== Scalation ===
Dorsal scales on the midbody are in 21–27, ventrals are in 197–228, and subcaudals are in 61–72 rows, subscales are paired, and the anal scale is single. There are seven upper labials, one upper labial enters the eye; two preoculars, three postoculars, and the lower labials are usually eight in number (range 7-9).

== Distribution and habitat ==
The red spitting cobra is mainly found in East Africa, including Djibouti, Eritrea, Somalia, southern Egypt, northern and eastern Ethiopia, and northern Tanzania and northern Sudan. It is also widespread in the dry country of eastern, southern and northern Kenya. It primarily inhabits dry savanna and semidesert areas of East Africa up to an elevation of about 1,200 metres (3,900 ft) above sea level. They can usually be found near water holes.

== Behaviour ==
Red spitting cobras are terrestrial, fast and alert snakes. Adult specimens of this species are nocturnal, while juveniles are more active during the day. Adults like to hide in termite mounds, old logs, holes, brush piles or any other ground cover during the day. They are also known to be cannibalistic; this could be the reason juveniles and smaller specimens are diurnal, while adults are nocturnal.

When threatened, this cobra rears up and displays a typical cobra hood. It may also hiss loudly. If the intruder does not retreat, it may spray jets of venom to the face of the intruder. In very rare cases, it can even spray its venom without rearing up and displaying its hood. Venom in the eyes can cause burning pain and blindness. Even so, this snake seldom causes fatalities in humans. Juvenile red spitting cobras spit more venom (relative to their body size) than adult cobras do.

== Diet ==
This species has a wide range of prey, but they prefer amphibians such as toads and frogs, if and when they are available. However, they will prey on rodents, birds and probably other snakes. They are known to raid chickens in the region.

== Reproduction ==
The red spitting cobra is oviparous. The female will lay 6 to 21 eggs.

== Venom ==
The venom of this species, like most spitting cobras, contains a mixture of neurotoxins and cytotoxins. Bite symptoms include slight pain around the wound and numbness of the lips, fingers and tongue. Although it rarely causes human fatalities, survivors are usually disfigured. The murine IP LD_{50} value for this snake is 2 mg/kg.

In September 2011, a snake keeper from the Eastern Cape in South Africa died shortly after a red spitting cobra sprayed venom into his face while he and a friend were photographing the snake. Some of the venom was believed to have entered his nasal passages and led to anaphylactic shock. His asthma is believed to have contributed to the fatal reaction.

== Taxonomy ==
This species was formerly considered to be a subspecies of Naja mossambica, N. m. pallida, but is now categorized as a separate species. Indeed, N. mossambica is more closely related to N. nigricollis than to this species. The red spitting cobra is closely related and forms a sister taxon with the Nubian spitting cobra (Naja nubiae) of northeastern Africa, which was originally considered a northern population of N. m. pallida before being recognized as a distinct species in 2003.
