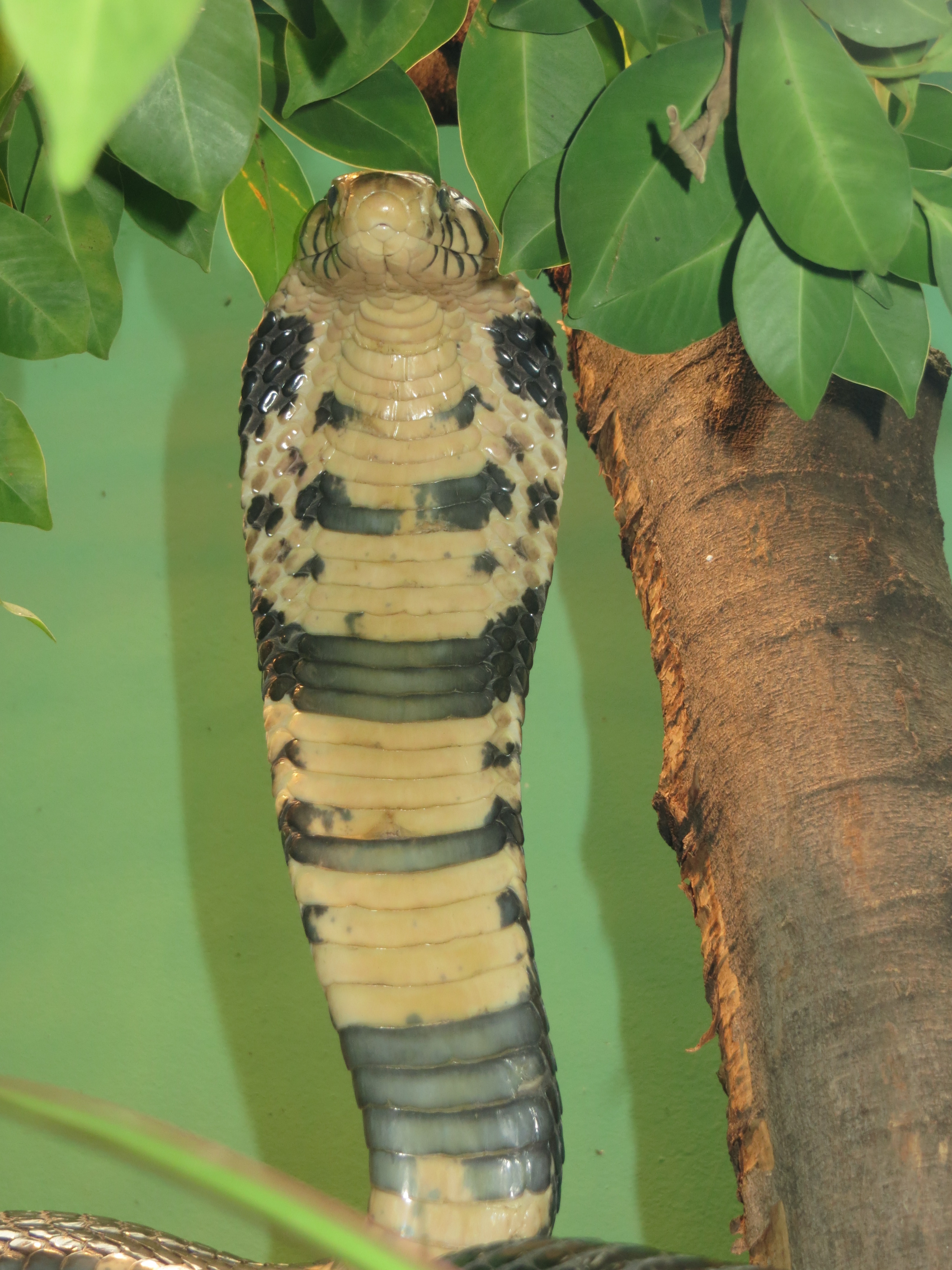

Conservation status
- Least Concern (IUCN 3.1)

Scientific classification
- Kingdom: Animalia
- Phylum: Chordata
- Class: Reptilia
- Order: Squamata
- Suborder: Serpentes
- Family: Elapidae
- Genus: Naja
- Subgenus: Boulengerina
- Species: N. savannula

Binomial name
- Naja savannula (Broadley, Trape, Chirio & Wüster in Wüster et al., 2018)

= West African banded cobra =

Species of snake

The West African banded cobra (Naja savannula) is a species of cobra in the genus Naja that is found in West Africa.

This species was previously thought to be identical to the forest cobra (Naja melanoleuca), but morphological and genetic differences have led to its recognition as a separate species. It differs from Naja melanoleuca and other forest cobras in having a series of 3–8 broad, semi-divided light bands across the anterior body.

== Description ==
Brownish black or black dorsally, with a series of 3–8 broad, cream-coloured crossbands, each partly divided by a narrow black crossband. Midbody dorsal scale rows 19, Ventrals 211–226, subcaudals 67–73. Maximum recorded length 223 cm

== Distribution ==
West Africa: primarily gallery forests in West African savannas and savanna woodlands; recorded from Senegal, Gambia, Guinea, Mali, Burkina Faso, Ivory Coast, Ghana, Togo, Benin, Niger, Nigeria, northern Cameroon and southern Chad.
