= Wolfgang Wüster =

Herpetologist

Wolfgang Wüster (born 1964) is a herpetologist and Professor in Zoology at Bangor University, UK.

Wüster attained his bachelor's degree at the University of Cambridge in 1985 and his doctorate at the University of Aberdeen in 1990. His primary areas of research are the systematics and ecology of venomous snakes and the evolution of their venoms. He has authored approximately 180 scientific papers on varying herpetological subjects. Recent contributions have included descriptions of new species, especially of cobras, several studies into how natural selection drives the evolution of snake venoms, and demonstrating the likely vulnerability of Madagascar's native fauna to the skin toxins of the invasive Asian toad Duttaphrynus melanostictus. He was the scientific editor for The Herpetological Journal (2002–2009), the scientific publication of the British Herpetological Society.

He has participated in the description of the following taxa:

- Naja mandalayensis Slowinski & Wüster 2000.
- Drymarchon caudomaculatus Wüster, Yrausquin & Mijares-Urrutia 2001.
- Lycodon cardamomensis Daltry & Wüster 2002.
- Naja nubiae Wüster & Broadley 2003.
- Naja ashei Wüster & Broadley 2007.
- Naja senegalensis Trape, Chirio & Wüster 2009.
- Subgenus Afronaja Wallach, Wüster & Broadley 2009.
- Acanthophis cryptamydros Maddock, Ellis, Doughty, Smith & Wüster 2015.
- Naja guineensis Broadley, Trape, Chirio, Ineich & Wüster 2018.
- Naja savannula Broadley, Trape, Chirio & Wüster 2018.
- Hemachatus nyangensis Reissig, Major, Renk, Barlow, Paijmans, Morris, Hofreiter, Broadley & Wüster 2023.
- Ophiophagus salvatana Gowri Shankar, Das & Wüster 2024.
