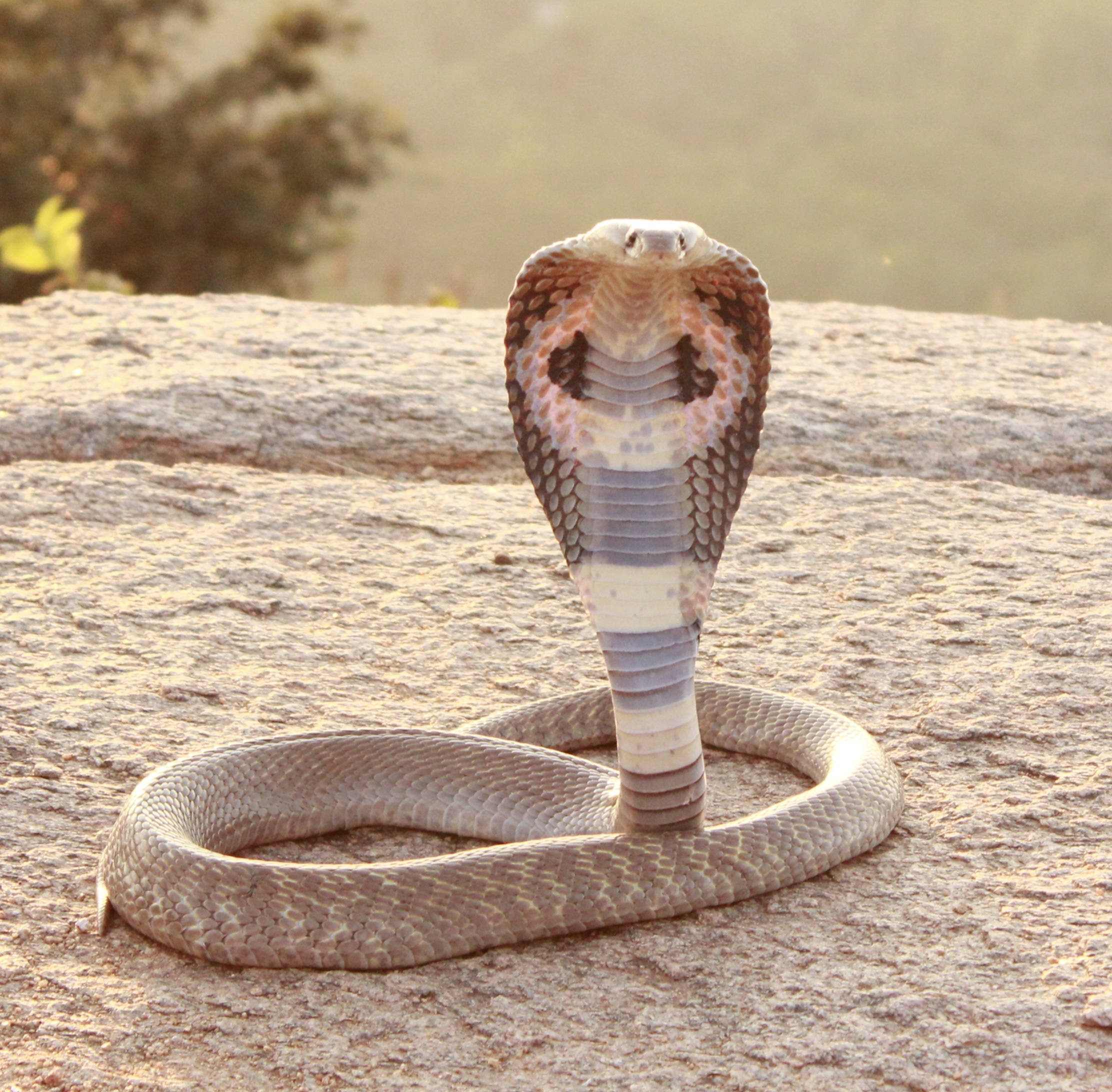

Conservation status
- Least Concern (IUCN 3.1)
- CITES Appendix II

Scientific classification
- Kingdom: Animalia
- Phylum: Chordata
- Class: Reptilia
- Order: Squamata
- Suborder: Serpentes
- Family: Elapidae
- Genus: Naja
- Species: N. naja

Binomial name
- Naja naja (Linnaeus, 1758)
- Indian cobra distribution

Synonyms
- List: Coluber naja Linnaeus, 1758; Naja brasiliensis Laurenti, 1768; Naja fasciata Laurenti, 1768; Naja lutescens Laurenti, 1768; Naja maculata Laurenti, 1768; Naja non-naja Laurenti, 1768; Coluber caecus Gmelin, 1788; Coluber rufus Gmelin, 1788; Coluber Naja Shaw & Nodder, 1791; Coluber Naja Shaw & Nodder, 1794; Naja tripudians Merrem, 1820; Naja nigra Gray, 1830; Naja tripudians forma typica Boulenger, 1896; Naja tripudians var. caeca Boulenger, 1896; Naja naja naja Smith, 1943; Naja naja gangetica Deraniyagala, 1945; Naja naja lutescens Deraniyagala, 1945; Naja naja madrasiensis Deraniyagala, 1945; Naja naja indusi Deraniyagala, 1960; Naja naja bombaya Deraniyagala, 1961; Naja naja karachiensis Deraniyagala, 1961; Naja naja ceylonicus Chatman & Di Mari, 1974; Naja naja polyocellata Mehrtens, 1987; Naja ceylonicus Osorio E Castro & Vernon, 1989; Naja (Naja) naja — Wallach, 2009

= Indian cobra =

Species of snake

The Indian cobra (Naja naja /nadʒa nadʒa/), also known commonly as the spectacled cobra, Asian cobra, or binocellate cobra, is a species of cobra, a venomous snake in the family Elapidae. The species is native to the Indian subcontinent, and is a member of the "Big Four" species that are responsible for the most snakebite cases in Sri Lanka and India.

The Indian cobra is revered in Hindu mythology and culture, and is often seen with snake charmers. It is a protected species under the Indian Wildlife Protection Act (1972).

== Taxonomy ==
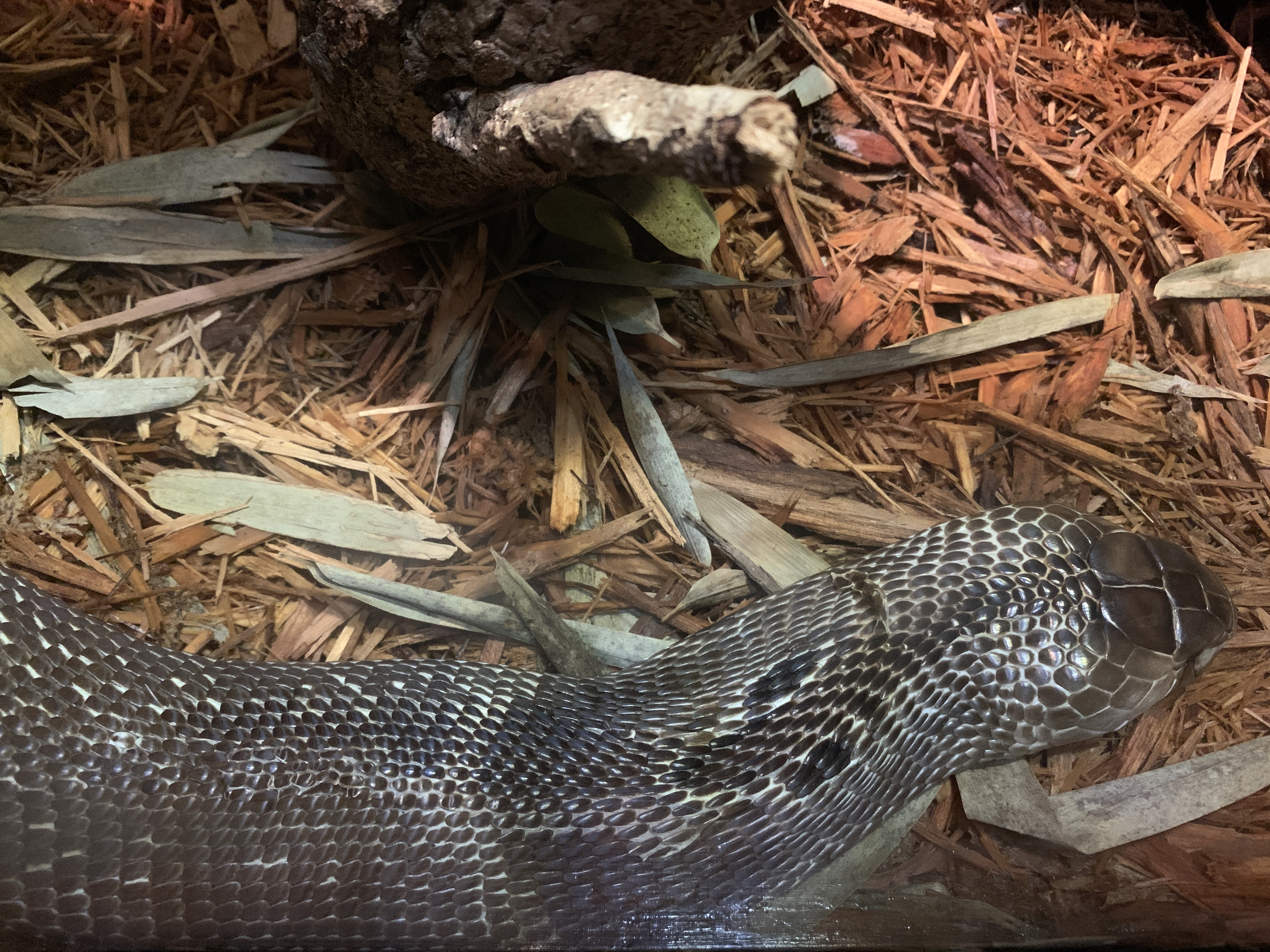
Resting, at the Bronx Zoo.

The generic name and the specific epithet naja is a Latinisation of the Sanskrit word nāga (नाग) meaning "cobra".

The Indian cobra is classified under the genus Naja of the family Elapidae. The genus was first described by Josephus Nicolaus Laurenti in 1768. The species Naja naja was first described by the Swedish physician, zoologist, and botanist Carl Linnaeus in 1758. The genus Naja was split into several subgenera based on various factors, including morphology, diet, and habitat. Naja naja is part of the subgenus Naja, along with all the other species of Asiatic cobras, including Naja kaouthia, Naja siamensis, Naja sputatrix, and the rest.

Naja naja is considered to be the prototypical cobra species within the subgenus Naja, and within the entire genus Naja. All Asiatic species of Naja were considered conspecific with Naja naja until the 1990s, often as subspecies thereof. Many of the subspecies were later found to be artificial or composites. This causes much potential confusion when interpreting older literature.

- Naja
  - (Naja)
    - Naja (Naja) naja
    - - - Naja (Naja) kaouthia
        - Naja (Naja) atra
        - Naja (Naja) sagittifera
        - Naja (Naja) oxiana
      - - Naja (Naja) sputatrix
        - - - Naja (Naja) samarensis
            - Naja (Naja) philippinensis
          - - Naja (Naja) mandalayensis
            - - Naja (Naja) sumatrana
              - Naja (Naja) siamensis
  - - (Afronaja)
      - - Naja (Afronaja) pallida
        - Naja (Afronaja) nubiae
      - - Naja (Afronaja) katiensis
        - - Naja (Afronaja) nigricollis
          - - Naja (Afronaja) ashei
            - - Naja (Afronaja) mossambica
              - Naja (Afronaja) nigricincta
    - - (Boulengerina)
        - Naja (Boulengerina) multifasciata
        - - - Naja (Boulengerina) christyi
            - Naja (Boulengerina) annulata
          - - - Naja (Boulengerina) savannula
              - Naja (Boulengerina) subfulva
            - - Naja (Boulengerina) guineensis
              - Naja (Boulengerina) peroescobari
              - Naja (Boulengerina) melanoleuca
      - (Uraeus)
        - Naja (Uraeus) nivea
        - - Naja (Uraeus) senegalensis
          - - Naja (Uraeus) haje
            - Naja (Uraeus) arabica
          - - Naja (Uraeus) annulifera
            - Naja (Uraeus) anchietae

== Description ==
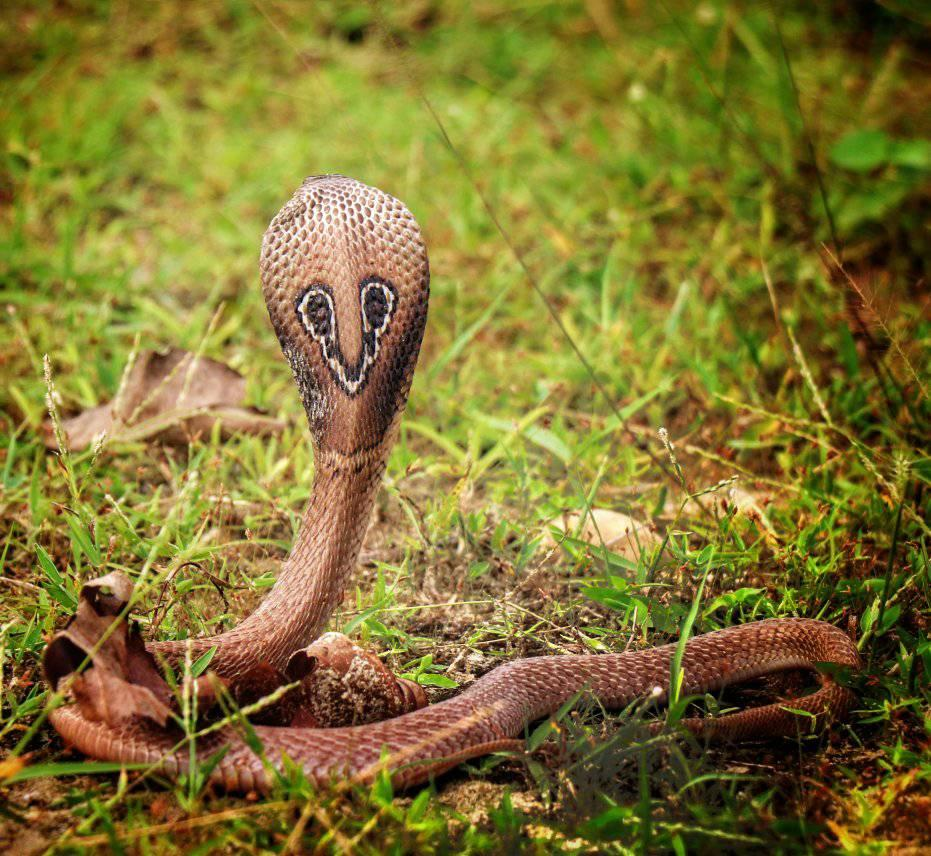
Spectacle pattern

The Indian cobra is a moderately sized, heavy-bodied species. This cobra species can easily be identified by its relatively large hood, which it expands when threatened.

Many specimens exhibit a hood mark. This hood mark is located at the rear (dorsal surface) of the Indian cobra's hood. When the hood mark is present, it consists of two circular ocelli patterns connected by a curved line, evoking the image of spectacles.

This species has a head that is elliptical, depressed, and very slightly distinct from the neck. The snout is short and rounded with large nostrils. The eyes are medium in size and the pupils are round. The majority of adult specimens range from 1 to 1.5 metres (3.3 to 4.9 ft) in length. Some specimens, particularly those from Sri Lanka, may grow to lengths of 2.1 to 2.2 metres (6.9 to 7.2 ft), but this is relatively uncommon.

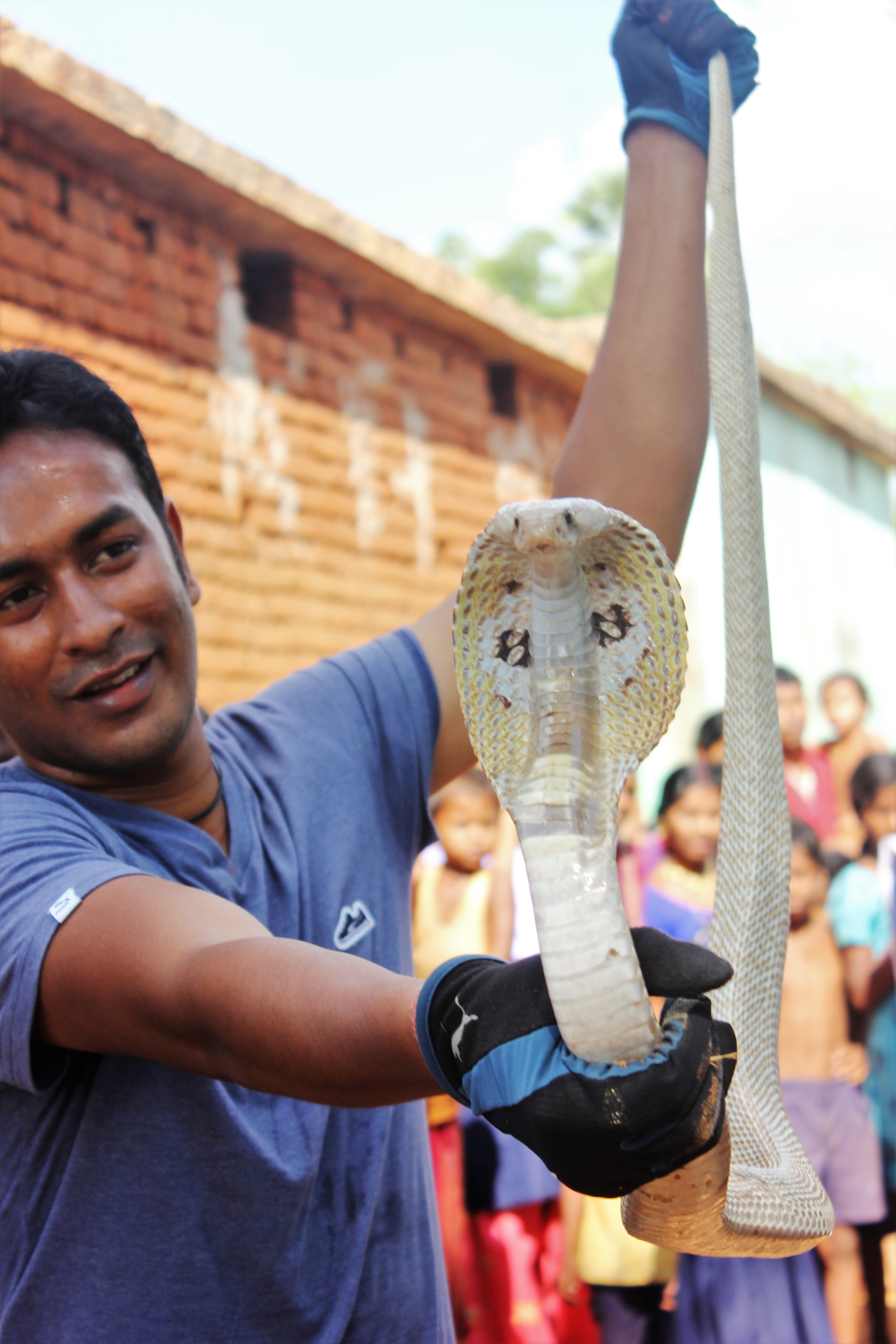
A rare 6.5 ft leucistic cobra captured in a village in Odisha

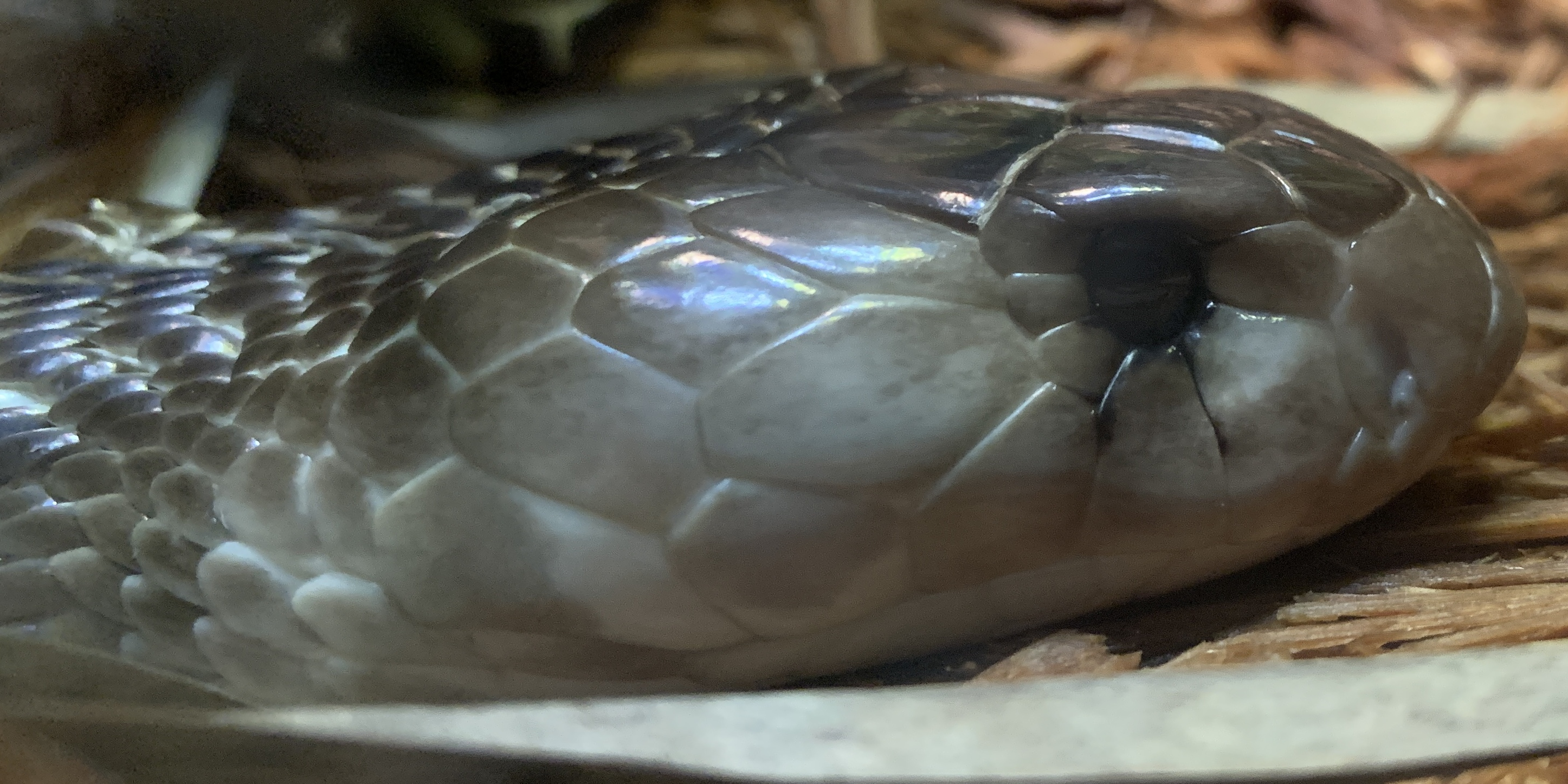
Closeup when resting. Bronx Zoo.

The Indian cobra varies tremendously in colour and pattern throughout its range. The ventral scales or the underside colouration of this species can be grey, yellow, tan, brown, reddish or black. Dorsal scales of the Indian cobra may have a hood mark or colour patterns. The most common visible pattern is a posteriorly convex light band at the level of the 20th to 25th ventrals. Salt-and-pepper speckles, especially in adult specimens, are seen on the dorsal scales.

Specimens, particularly those found in Sri Lanka, may exhibit poorly defined banding on the dorsum. Ontogenetic colour change is frequently observed in specimens in the northwestern parts of their geographic range (southern Pakistan and northwestern India). In southern Pakistan, juvenile specimens may be grey in colour and may or may not have a hood mark. Adults on the other hand are typically uniformly black in colour on top (melanistic), while the underside, outside the throat region, is usually light.

Patterns on the throat and ventral scales are also variable in this species. The majority of specimens exhibit a light throat area followed by dark banding, which can be 4–7 ventral scales wide. Adult specimens also often exhibit a significant amount of mottling on the throat and on the venter, which makes patterns on this species less clear relative to patterns seen in other species of cobra. With the exception of specimens from the northwest, there is often a pair of lateral spots on the throat where the ventral and dorsal scales meet. The positioning of these spots varies, with northwestern specimens having the spots positioned more anterior, while specimens from elsewhere in their range are more posterior.

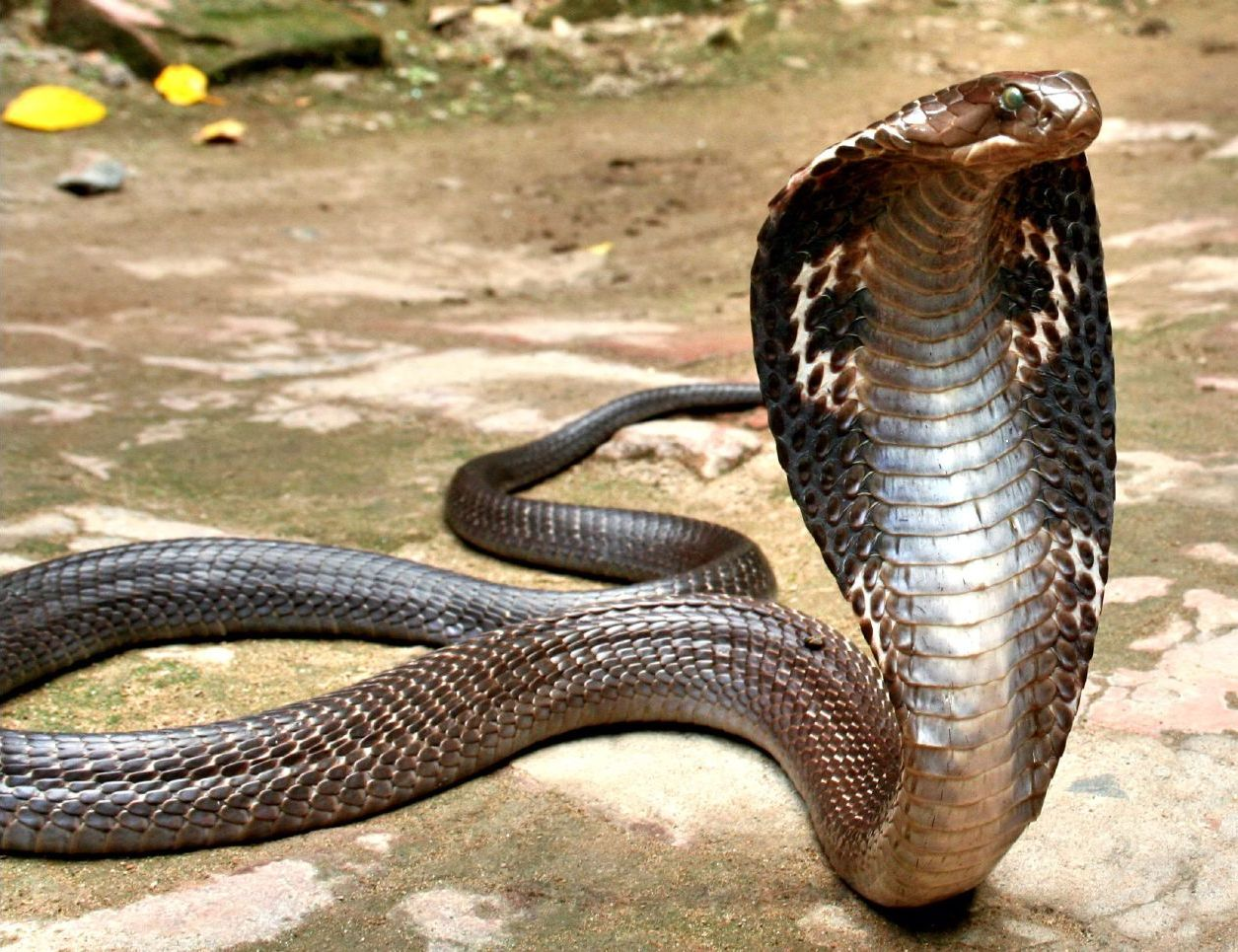
A large Indian cobra

=== Scalation ===
Dorsal scales are smooth and strongly oblique. Midbody scales are in 23 rows (21–25), with 171–197 ventrals. There are 48–75 divided subcaudals and the anal shield is single. There are seven upper labials (3rd the largest and in contact with the nasal anteriorly, 3rd and 4th in contact with the eye) and 9-10 lower labials (small angular cuneate scale present between 4th and 5th lower labial), as well as one preocular in contact with internasals, and three postoculars. Temporals are 2 + 3.

=== Similar species ===
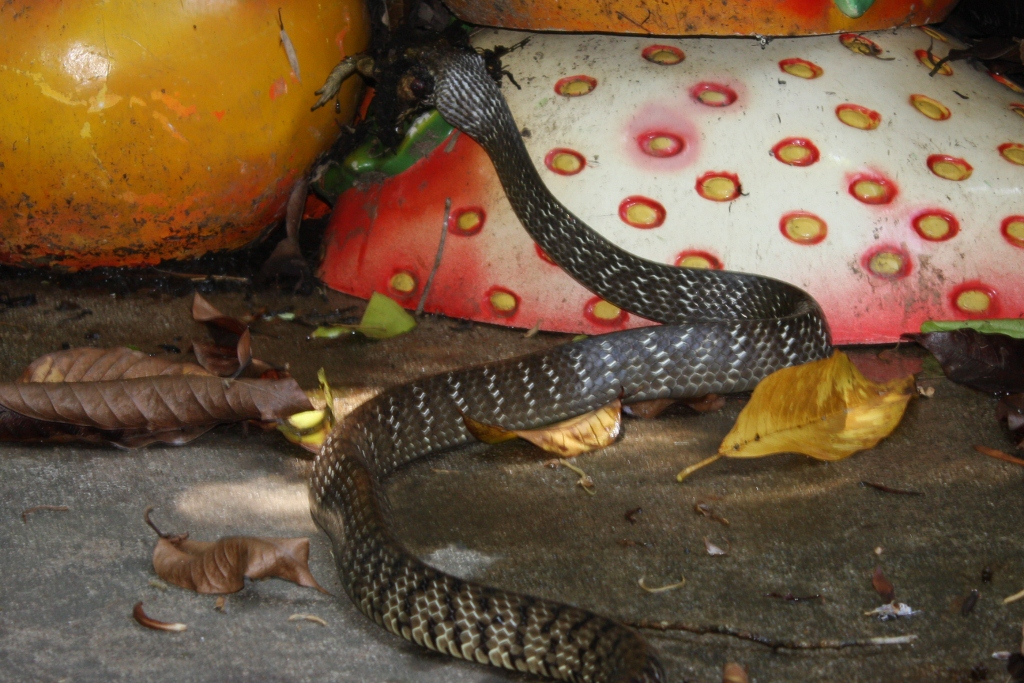
Note the patterning on the body of this oriental rat snake. Indian cobras don't have this patterning.

The Oriental rat snake Ptyas mucosa is often mistaken for the Indian cobra; however, this snake is much longer and can easily be distinguished by the more prominent ridged appearance of its body. Other snakes that resemble Naja naja are the banded racer Argyrogena fasciolata and the Indian smooth snake Wallophis brachyura. Also, the monocled cobra (Naja kaouthia) may be confused with Naja naja; however, the monocled cobra has an O-shaped pattern on the back of the hood, while the Indian cobra has a spectacles-shaped pattern on its hood. Confusions may exist with Caspian cobra (Naja oxiana), as some Indian cobra specimens without a hood mark are sometimes confused with N. oxiana, where these two species coexist in Pakistan and Afghanistan. Although some Caspian cobra specimens can be quite dark, they are never fully black like the Indian cobra. N. oxiana normally has several dark bands under the throat, whereas in the black phase of N. naja from Pakistan, almost the entire throat is black.

== Distribution ==
Silent film showing an African chameleon and an Indian cobra by Raymond L. Ditmars (?) Collection EYE Film Institute Netherlands.

The Indian cobra is native to the Indian subcontinent and can be found throughout India, Pakistan, Sri Lanka, Bangladesh, and southern Nepal. In India, it may or may not occur in the state of Assam, some parts of Kashmir, and it does not occur at high altitudes of over 2,000 metres (6,600 ft) and in extreme desert regions. In Pakistan, it is absent in most of Balochistan province, parts of Khyber Pakhtunkhwa Province, desert areas elsewhere and the Northern Areas. The most westerly record comes from Duki, Balochistan in Pakistan, while the most easterly record is from the Tangail District in Bangladesh. As this species has been observed in Drosh, in the Chitral Valley, it may also occur in the Kabul River Valley in extreme eastern Afghanistan. There's been at least one report of this species occurring in Bhutan.

== Habitat ==
The Indian cobra inhabits a wide range of habitats throughout its geographical range. It can be found in dense or open forests, plains, agricultural lands (rice paddy fields, wheat crops), rocky terrain, wetlands, and it can even be found in heavily populated urban areas, such as villages and city outskirts, ranging from sea level to 2,000 metres (6,600 ft) in altitude. This species is absent from true desert regions. The Indian cobra is often found in the vicinity of water. Preferred hiding locations are holes in embankments, tree hollows, termite mounds, rock piles and small mammal dens.

== Feeding ==
The Indian cobra feeds on rodents, plovers, grebes, lizards and frogs. It bites quickly, and then waits while its venom damages the nervous system of the prey, paralyzing and often killing it. Like all snakes, N. naja swallows its prey whole. This species sometimes enters buildings in search of rodent prey.

== Reproduction ==
The Indian cobra is oviparous, laying eggs in the months of April through July. The female usually lays between 10 and 30 eggs in rat holes or termite mounds, which hatch 48 to 69 days later. Each hatchling measures 20–30 cm (8–12 in) in total length (tail included). The hatchlings are independent from birth and have fully functional venom glands.

== Venom ==
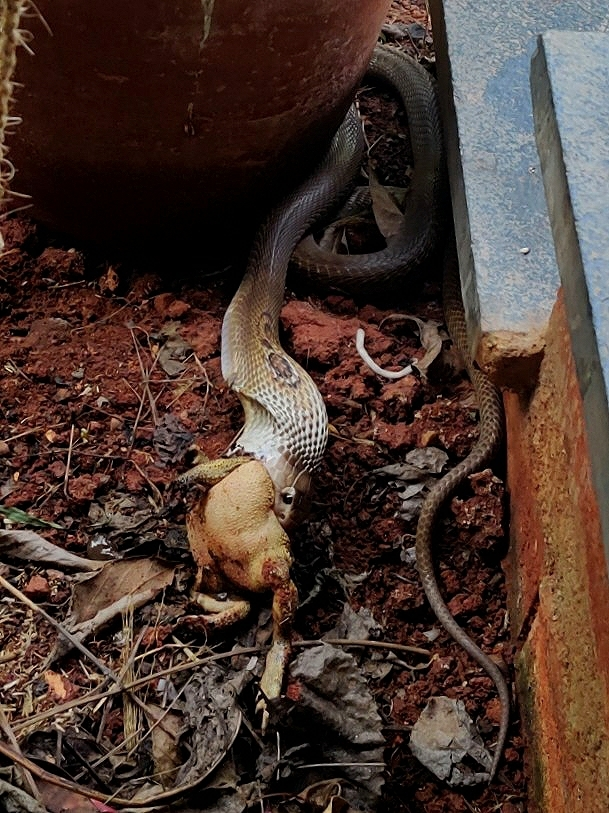
Eating an Asian common toad

The Indian cobra's venom mainly contains a powerful post-synaptic neurotoxin and cardiotoxin. The venom acts on the synaptic gaps of the nerves, thereby paralyzing muscles, and in severe bites leading to respiratory failure or cardiac arrest. The venom components include enzymes such as hyaluronidase that cause lysis and increase the spread of the venom. Envenomation symptoms may manifest between fifteen minutes and two hours following the bite.

In mice, the preferred LD_{50} value is estimated to be 0.56 mg/kg via subcutaneous injection (SC). However, there's a wide range of potency for this species, ranging from 0.22 mg/kg (in Pakistani N. naja karachiensis) to 0.84 mg/kg (Indian specimens). Minton (1974) reported a value of 0.29 mg/kg SC for specimens from northwest India, along with an average venom yield per bite range between 170 and 250 mg (dry weight). In another study, the average venom yield was 169 mg and a maximum yield of 610 mg (both were dry weights of milked venom). Though it is responsible for many bites, only a small percentage are fatal if proper medical treatment and antivenom are given. Mortality rates for untreated bite victims can vary from case to case, depending upon the quantity of venom delivered by the individual involved. According to one study, it is approximately 20–30%, but in another study involving victims who were given prompt medical treatment, the mortality rate was only 9%. In Bangladesh, it is responsible for most of the snake bite cases.

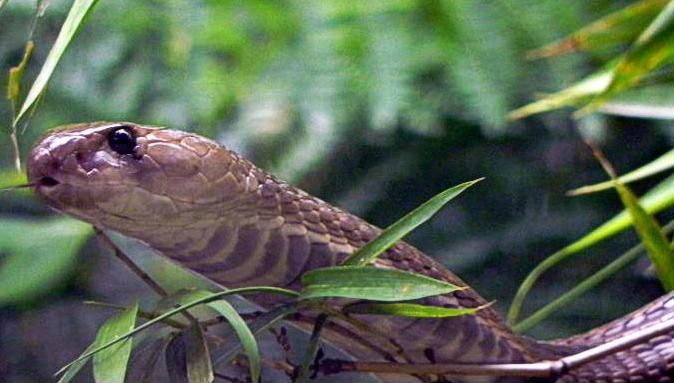
Spectacled cobra with hood lowered in a bamboo shrub

The Indian cobra is one of the big four snakes of South Asia that are responsible for the majority of human deaths by snakebite in Asia. Polyvalent serum is available for treating snakebites caused by these species. Zedoary, a local spice with a reputation for being effective against snakebite, has shown promise in experiments testing its activity against cobra venom.

The venom of young cobras has been used as a substance of abuse in India, with cases of snake charmers being paid for providing bites from their snakes. Though this practice is now seen as outdated, symptoms of such abuse include loss of consciousness, euphoria, and sedation.

As of November 2016, an antivenom has been developed by the Costa Rican Clodomiro Picado Institute, and the clinical trial phase was in Sri Lanka.

=== Envenomation and clinical manifestation ===
Indian cobra bites are very common in many parts of India, Pakistan, Sri Lanka, and throughout their range in South Asia. Hundreds of individual case reports have been published in books and journals over the past century. However, no large prospective study of patients with proven bites by N. naja has been undertaken and reported. In a survey of snakebites in India, 91.4% of cases were bitten by an unidentified snake. Of the 6.1% of identified venomous snakes responsible for bites, 40% were N. naja. As with bites by N. kaouthia and N. oxiana, patients may show manifestations of systemic neurotoxic envenoming or local envenoming or both, although N. oxiana bites produce noticeable symptoms of envenomation more rapidly, and prominent neurotoxicity (severe flaccid paralysis) is more common amongst patients bitten by N. oxiana. A woman bitten by N. oxiana in northwestern Pakistan suffered prominent neurotoxicity and died while en route to the closest hospital nearly 50 minutes after envenomation (death occurred 45–50 minutes post envenomation).

Local necrosis was described after cobra bites in India in the 1860s and up to the 1920s, but this was apparently forgotten until Reid's work in Malaysia. Severe local pain and swelling may begin almost immediately after the bite. The pain persists while swelling and tenderness extend up the bitten limb, sometimes spreading to the adjacent trunk. Darkening of the necrotic area of skin and blistering are apparent by about the third day, with a characteristic putrid smell typical of necrotic cobra bites in Africa and Asia. Early systemic symptoms include headache, nausea, vomiting, dizziness and a feeling of lassitude, drowsiness and intoxication. "Many subjects describe their drowsiness as if they had imbibed large quantities of some potent intoxicant." Neurotoxic symptoms begin with ptosis (the patient puckers their brow, contracting the frontalis muscle, attempting to raise the eyelids or tilts the head back so as to see beneath the drooping upper lids), profuse viscid saliva, inability to clear secretions, sagging of the jaw or inability to open the mouth and progression to respiratory paralysis. It is not clear from the available literature whether the proportion of patients developing neurotoxicity and necrosis is different from that in patients bitten by N. kaouthia.

The outstanding feature of systemic envenoming is paralysis of the muscles due to rapid action of neurotoxin at the myoneural junction. Respiratory paralysis may occur within 3 – 4 hours in severe cases. Drowsiness is the first symptom, but it is difficult to assess because it is a subjective symptom. All of the cases developed ptosis 1.5 – 6 hours post bite. Since ptosis is easy to detect, it is a valuable clinical sign for early diagnosis of systemic envenoming due to cobra bite. Restlessness, irregular breathing, and mental confusion usually developed before respiratory paralysis, indicating that they are significant early clinical signs of impending respiratory failure. It is important for clinicians to recognize the early signs of respiratory failure. Cases which show signs of systemic envenoming require antivenom. If some hours have elapsed since the bite, the antivenom may be less successful. In general, 100 ml. of antivenom should be given in the first 30 minutes. If there is no distinct clinical improvement within 1 hour, the dose should be repeated. Tracheostomy and artificial respiration are essential in cases of respiratory failure. Necrosis is the outstanding feature of local envenoming. Most patients were bitten on the foot while working in rice fields. Authors recommended the wearing of shoes or boots while working, and that persons bitten by a snake apply a firm ligature above the bite and go to the nearest health centre or hospital.

== Genome ==
Previous cytogenetic analysis revealed the Indian cobra has a diploid karyotype of 38 chromosomes, compromising seven pairs of macro-chromosomes, 11 pairs of micro-chromosomes and one pair of sexual chromosomes. Using next-generation sequencing and emerging genomic technologies, a de novo high-quality N. naja reference genome was published in 2020. The estimated size of this haploid genome is of 1.79 Gb, which has 43.22% of repetitive content and 40.46% of GC content. Specifically, macro-chromosomes, which represent 88% of the genome, have 39.8% of GC content, while micro-chromosomes, that represent only 12% of the genome, contain 43.5% of GC content.

=== Synteny analysis ===
Synteny analysis between the Indian cobra and the prairie rattlesnake genome revealed large syntenic blocks within macro, micro, and sexual chromosomes. This study allowed the observation of chromosomic fusion and fission events that are consistent with the difference in chromosome number between these species. For example, chromosome 4 of the Indian cobra shares syntenic regions with chromosomes 3 and 5 of the rattlesnake genome, indicating a possible fusion event. Besides, chromosomes 5 and 6 of the Indian cobra are syntenic to rattlesnake chromosome 4, indicating a possible fusion event between these chromosomes.

On the other hand, by performing whole-genome synteny comparison between the Indian cobra and other reptilian and avian genomes, it was revealed the presence of large syntenic regions between macro, micro, and sexual chromosomes across species from these classes, which indicates changes in chromosome organization between reptile and avian genomes and is consistent with their evolutionary trajectories.

=== Gene organization ===
Using protein homology information and expression data from different tissues of the cobra, 23,248 protein-coding genes, 31,447 transcripts, and 31,036 proteins, which included alternatively spliced products, where predicted from this genome. 85% of these predicted proteins contained start and stop codon, and 12% contained an N-terminal secretion signal sequence, which is an important feature in terms of toxins secretion from venom glands.

==== Venom gland genes ====
Further studies on gene prediction and annotation of the Indian cobra genome identified 139 toxin genes from 33 protein families. These included families like three-finger toxins (3FTxs), snake venom metalloproteinases (SVMP), cysteine-rich secretory venom proteins and other toxins including natriuretic peptide, C-type lectin, snake venom serine proteinase (SVSP), Kunitz and venom complement-activating gene families, group I phospholipase A2 (PLA2) and one cobra venom factor (CVF) gene. These major toxin gene families in the Indian cobra are mostly found in the snake's macro-chromosomes, which differs from Crotalus virides (rattlesnake) that presents them in its micro-chromosomes, and is indicative of the differences in their venom evolution. Besides, comparison of venom gland genes between the Indian cobra and C. virides, identified 15 toxin gene families that are unique to the Indian cobra, which included cathelicidins and phospholipase B-like toxins.

=== Venom gland transcriptome and toxin gene identification ===
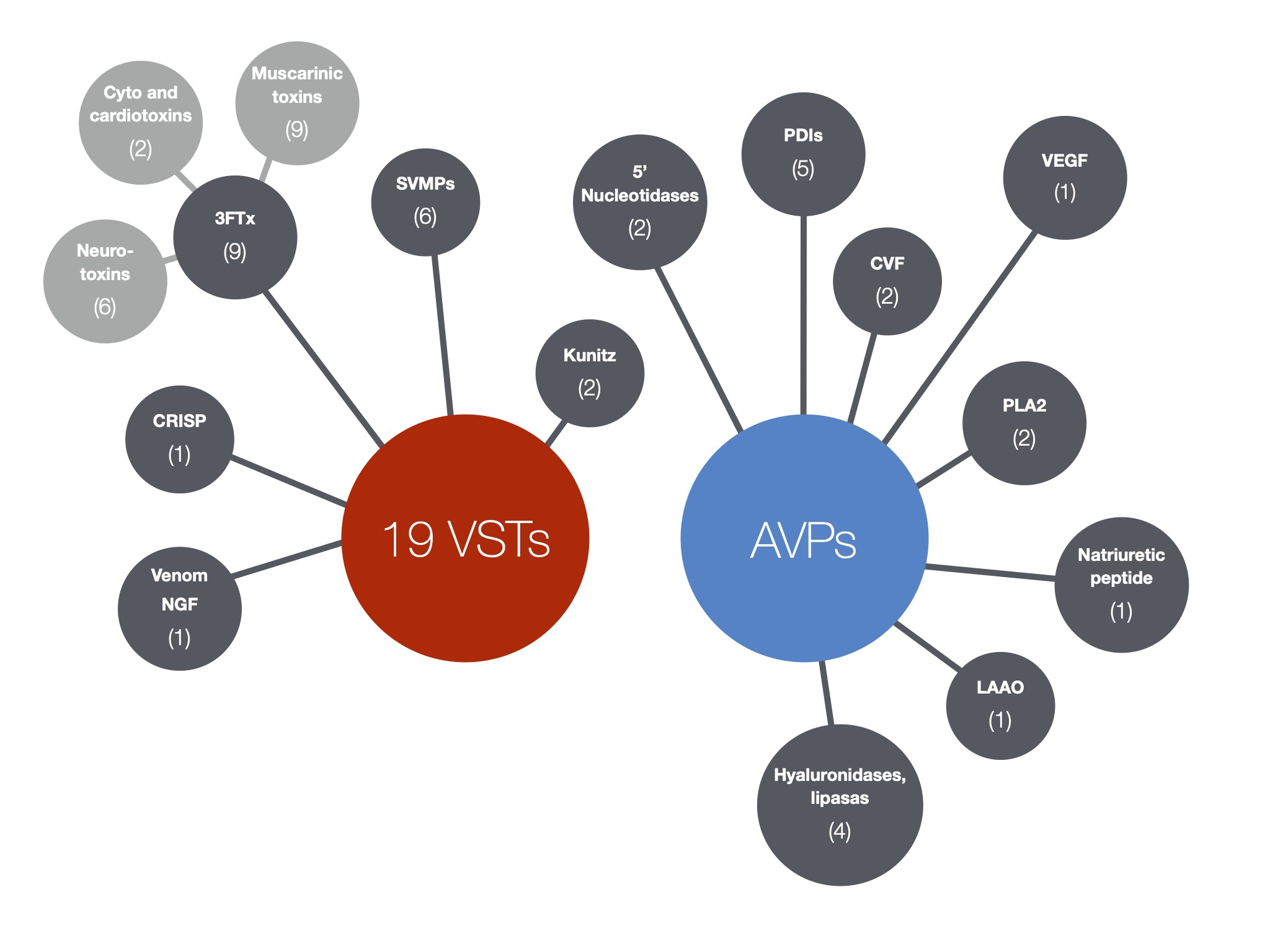
Indian cobra venom composition classified in venom specific or accessory proteins based on genomic annotation and transcriptomic data by Suryamohan et al., 2020.

Analysis of transcriptomic data from 14 different tissues of the Indian cobra identified 19,426 expressed genes. Out of these genes, 12,346 belonged to the venom gland transcriptome, which included 139 genes from 33 toxin gene families. Additionally, differential expression analysis revealed that 109 genes from 15 different toxin gene families were significantly up-regulated (fold change > 2) in the venom gland and this included 19 genes that were exclusively expressed in this gland.

These 19 venom specific toxins (VSTs) encode the core effector toxin proteins and include 9 three-finger toxins (out of which six are neurotoxins, one cytotoxin, one cardiotoxin and one muscarinic toxin), six snake venom metalloproteinases, one nerve growth factor, two venom Kunitz serine proteases and a cysteine-rich secretory venom protein. Additionally to these VSTs, other accessory venom proteins (AVPs) were also found to be highly expressed in the venom gland such as: cobra venom factor (CVF), coagulation factors, protein disulfide isomerases, natriuretic peptides, hyaluronidases, phospholipases, L-amino acid oxidase (LAAO), vascular endothelial growth factor (VEGF) and 5' nucleotidases.

This transcriptomic data together with the information provided by the high quality Indian cobra genome generated by Susyamohan et al., 2020 suggest that these VSTs together with AVPs form the core toxic effector components of this venomous snake, which induce muscular paralysis, cardiovascular dysfunction, nausea, blurred vision and hemorrhage after snake bite.

The identification of these genes coding for core toxic effector components from the Indian cobra venom may allow the development of recombinant antivenoms based in neutralizing antibodies for VST proteins.

== Relationship with humans ==
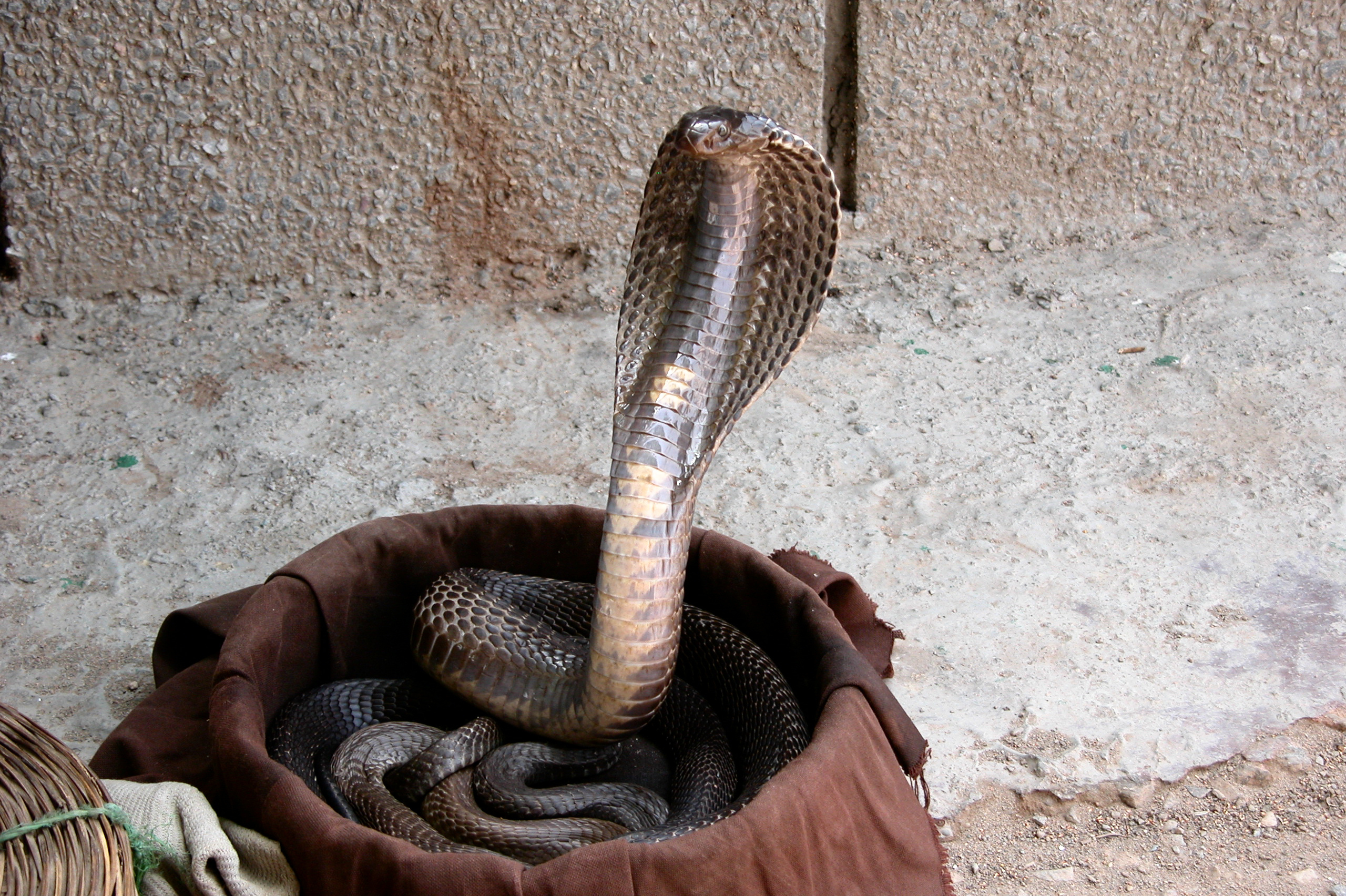
Cobra in a basket, raising its head and spreading its hood

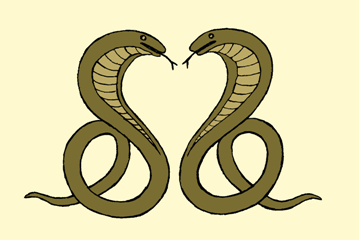
Indian cobras as part of the heraldry of a princely state of India; the Kalahandi State coat of arms.

The Indian cobra holds a prominent place in the religious, mythological, and cultural landscape of the Indian subcontinent.

=== In popular culture ===
The Indian cobra features prominently in literature, folklore, and cinema. It is a recurring figure in Indian fables, proverbs, and cautionary tales, often symbolizing both danger and divine power.

Rudyard Kipling's 1894 short story "Rikki-Tikki-Tavi" features a pair of Indian cobras named Nag and Nagaina, the Hindi words for male and female snake, respectively.

=== Mythology ===
==== Hinduism ====
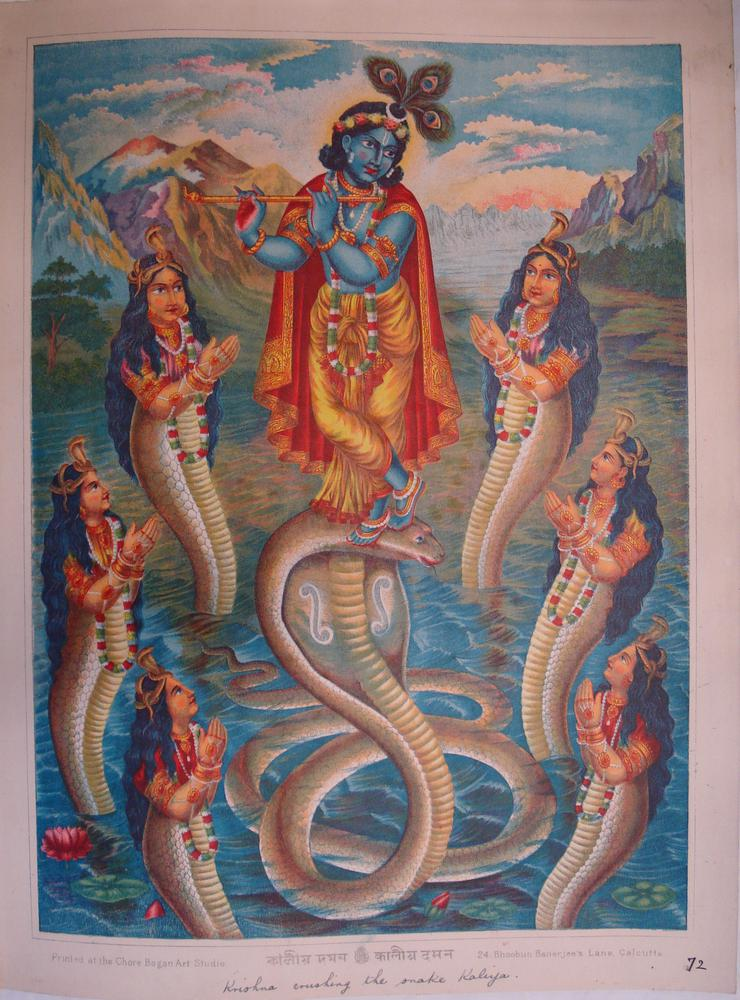
1895 lithograph from Calcutta's Chorebagan Art Studio, depicting Krishna's victory over the snake Kaliya, whose appearance here is modelled after the real life Indian cobra. Both are in turn surrounded by the latter's nagini consorts with folded hands, pleading for mercy.

The Indian cobra is often featured in Hindu religion and revered in several regional traditions. The Hindu god Shiva is often depicted with a cobra called Vasuki, coiled around his neck, symbolizing his mastery over maya, the illusory nature of the world. Vishnu, in his form called the anantashayana, is usually portrayed as reclining on the coiled body of Shesha, a giant snake deity with multiple cobra heads. Cobras are also worshipped during the Hindu festival of Naga Panchami and Nagula Chavithi. When killed by humans, it is usually cremated with milk and ghee along with a cloth by Hindus.

==== Buddhism ====
In Buddhism, cobras ("Naga"s) are seen as protective beings. The Naga king Mucilinda is said to have shielded The Buddha from a storm by spreading his hood over him during meditation. Nagas are regarded as guardians of water and spiritual treasures, and their imagery appears frequently in Buddhist art across South and Southeast Asia.

==== Other traditions ====
In Jainism, the cobra is linked to Parshvanatha, the twenty-third Tirthankara, who is often shown with a canopy of snake hoods as a sign of divine protection.

=== Snake charming ===
Snake charming has traditionally featured the Indian cobra as the star attraction, with performers using the snake's dramatic hood display to captivate audiences. Although widely believed to respond to music, the cobra actually follows the movements of the charmer's instrument, as it cannot hear airborne sounds. Once common at fairs and public gatherings, snake charming has declined in recent years due to stricter wildlife protection laws and growing concern for animal welfare. Despite this, the practice has contributed to the cobra's iconic status and remains a familiar image in popular imagination.

=== Heraldry ===
Indian cobras were often a heraldic element in the official symbols of certain princely states of India such as Gwalior, Kolhapur, Pal Lahara, Gondal, Khairagarh and Kalahandi, among others.

== Gallery ==
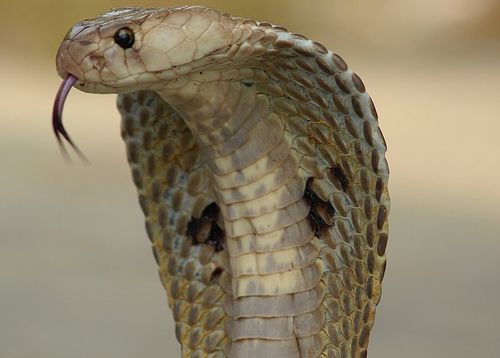
Indian cobra displaying an impressive hood

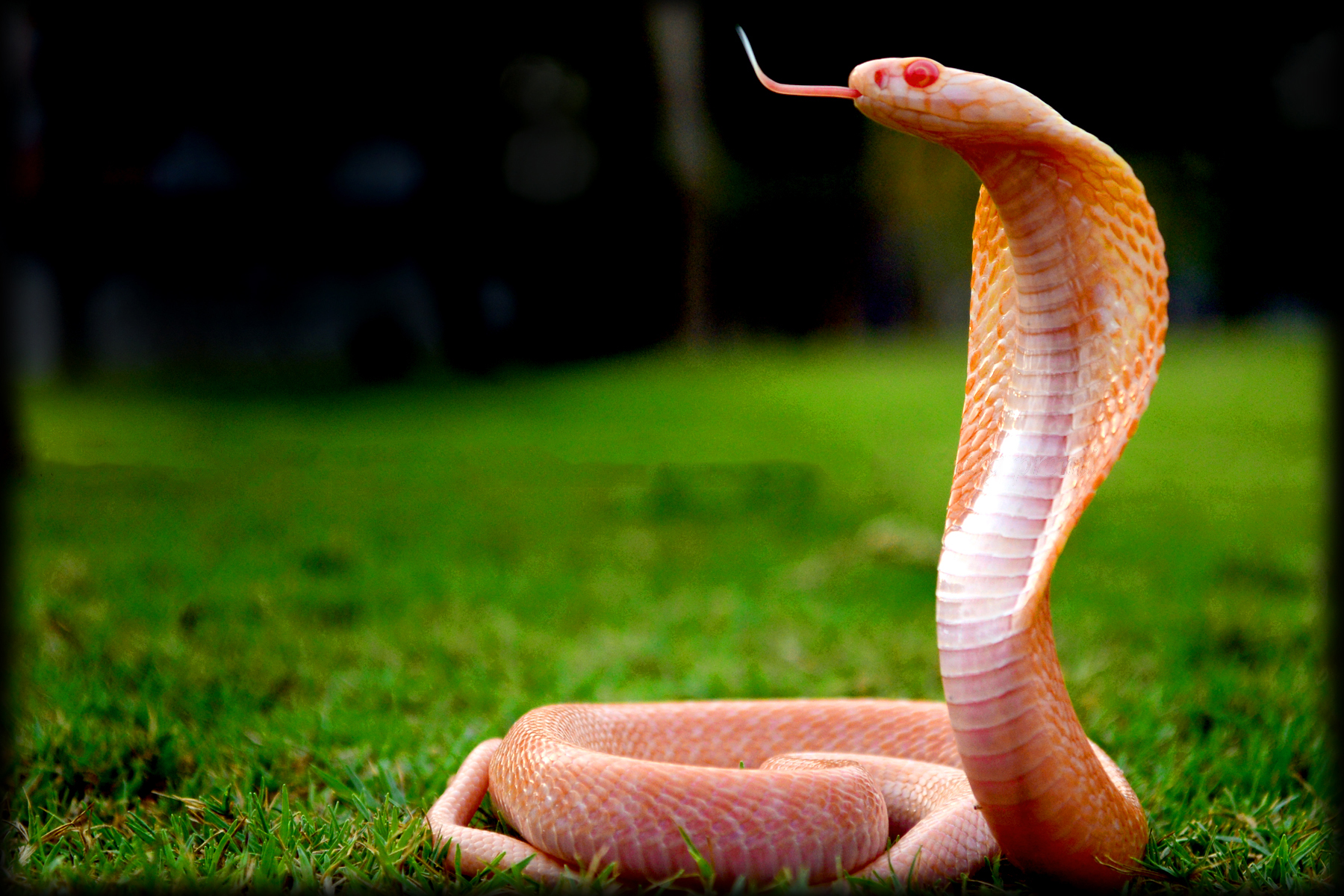
Albino spectacled cobra

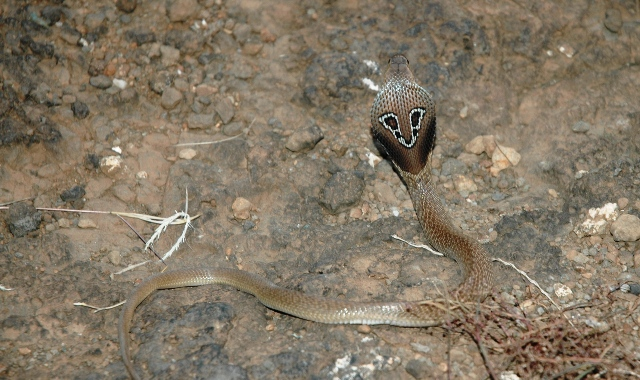
Binocellate cobra

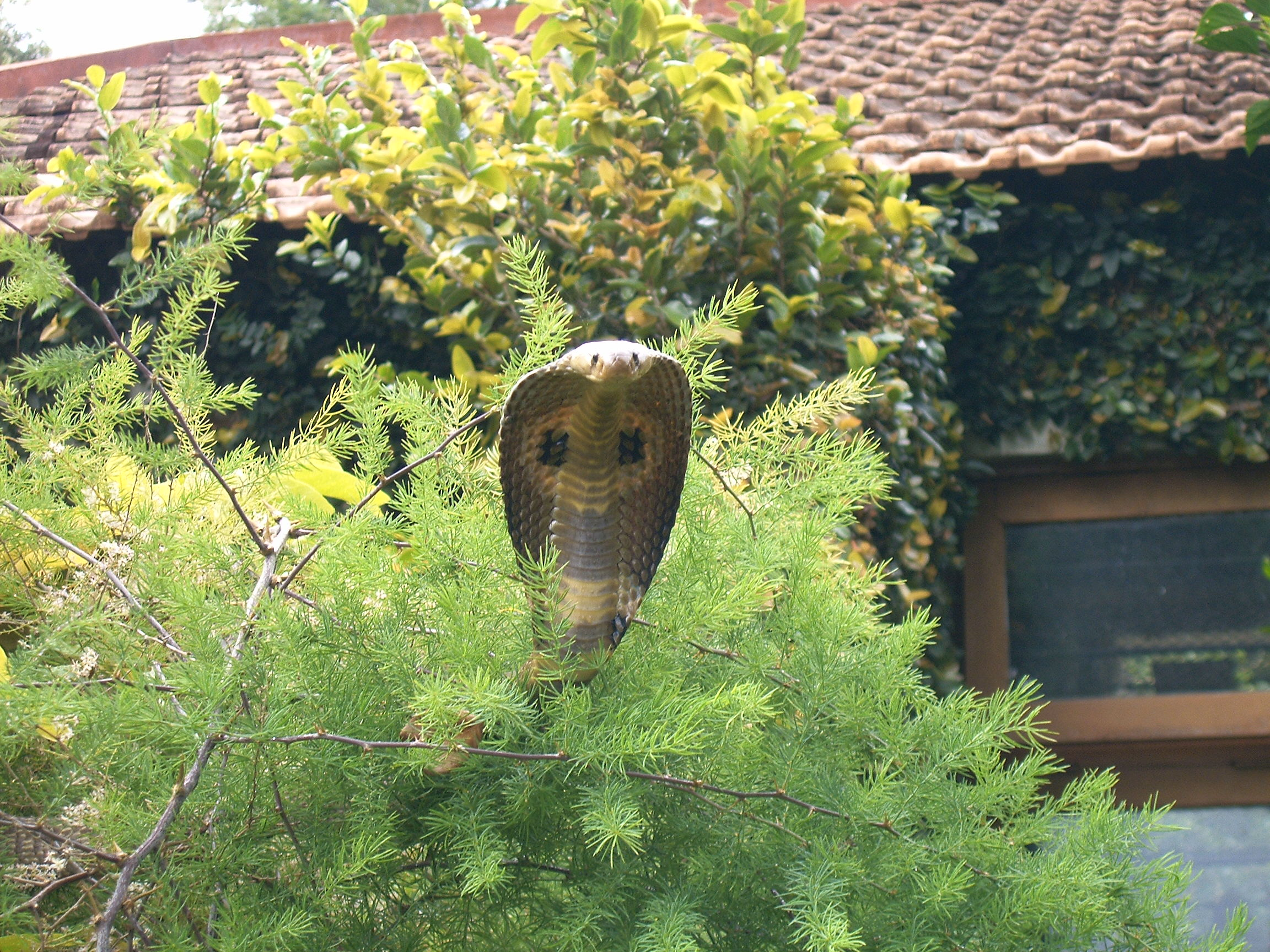
Indian cobra outside a home in Yelandur, Karnataka, South India

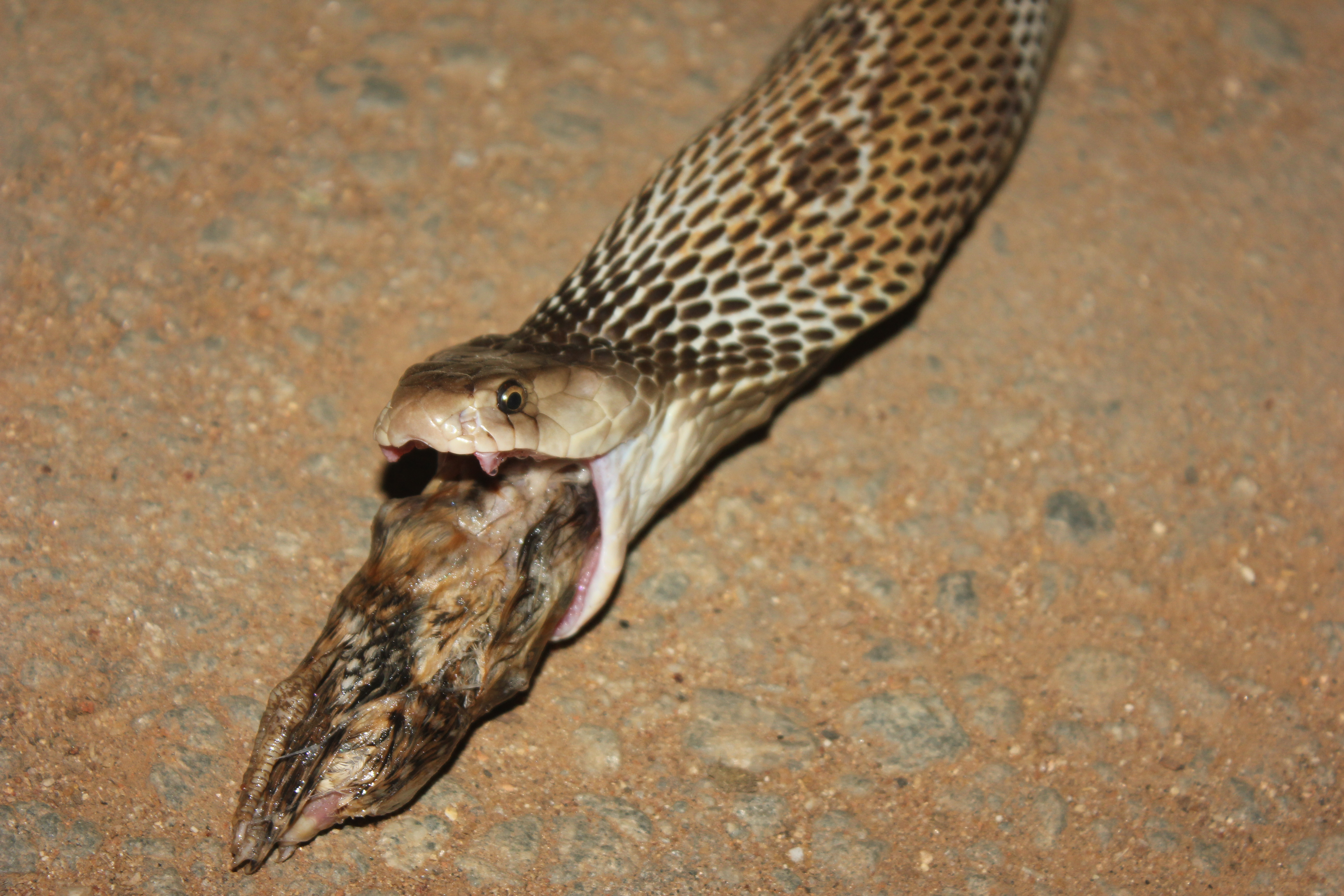
Cobra regurgitating

== Local names ==
The Indian cobra or spectacled cobra, being common in South Asia, is referred to by a number of local names deriving from the root of Naga.

For Indo-Aryan and Dravidian languages:

- Phalinger (फ्लिंगर) in Dogri
- Phetigom (ফেতিগোম) in Assamese
- Gokhra (গোখরা) in Bengali
- Naag (नाग) in Hindi
- Fetaar (फेटार) in Awadhi
- Goman (गोमन) in Nepali
- Gehuan (गेहुंअन)in Magahi and Bhojpuri
- Domi (डोमी) in Chhattisgarhi
- Naag (નાગ) in Gujarati
- Nagara Haavu (ನಾಗರ ಹಾವು) in Kannada
- Moorkkan (മൂര്‍ഖന്‍) in Malayalam
- Naag (नाग) in Marathi
- Gokhara Saapa (ଗୋଖର ସାପ) or Naaga Saapa (ନାଗ ସାପ) in Odia
- Naya (නයා) or Nagaya (නාගයා) in Sinhalese
- Nalla pambu (நல்ல பாம்பு) or Nagapambu (நாகப்பாம்பு) in Tamil
- Nagu-paamu(నాగుపాము) in Telugu
- Saanp ( سانپ/sɑ̃ːp/) in Urdu
