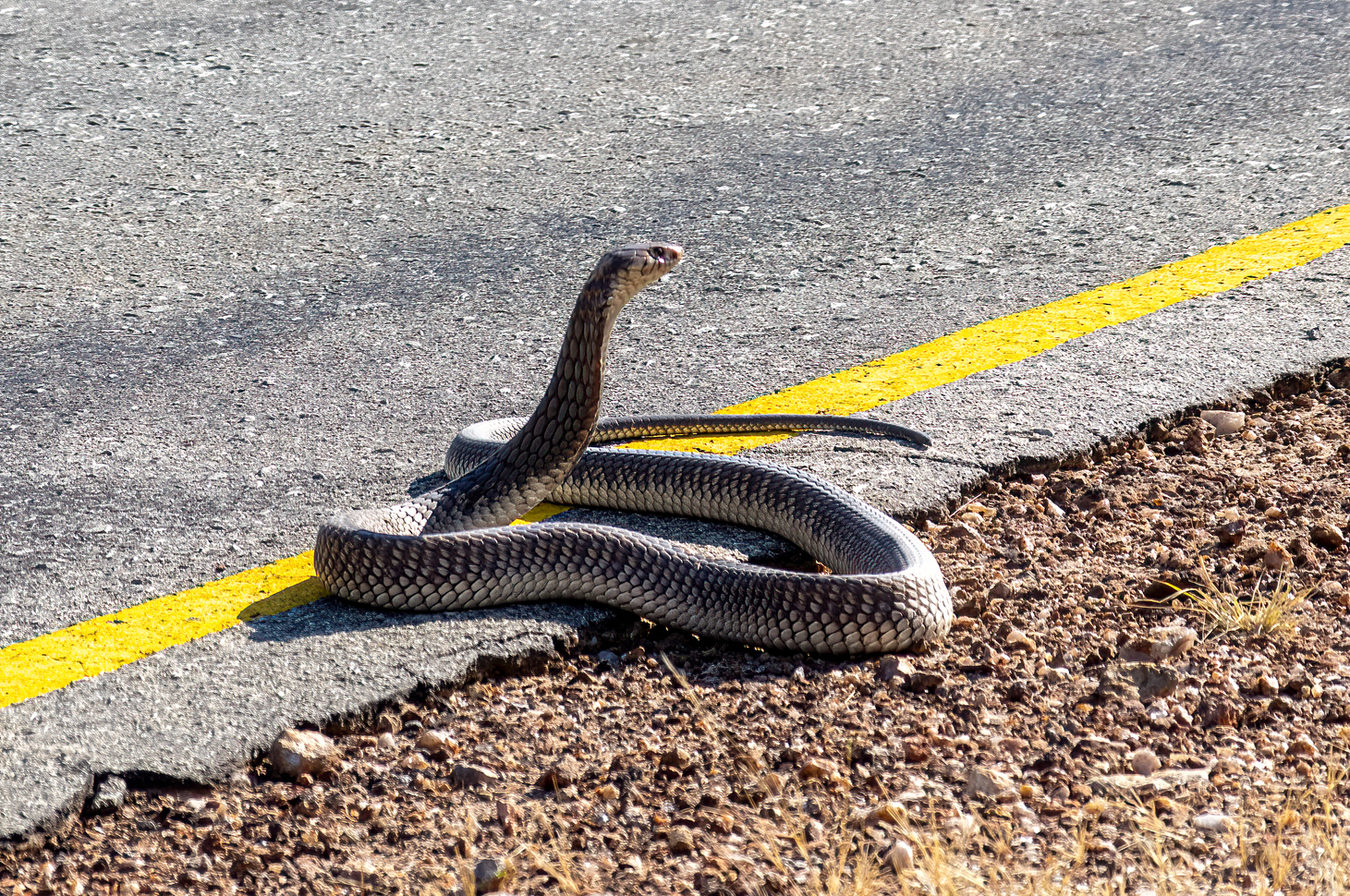
- Naja anchietae in Zambezi, Namibia

Conservation status
- Least Concern (IUCN 3.1)

Scientific classification
- Kingdom: Animalia
- Phylum: Chordata
- Class: Reptilia
- Order: Squamata
- Suborder: Serpentes
- Family: Elapidae
- Genus: Naja
- Subgenus: Uraeus
- Species: N. anchietae

Binomial name
- Naja anchietae Bocage, 1879
- Anchieta's cobra distribution

Synonyms
- Naja anchietae Bocage, 1879; Naja haje Boettger, 1887 [not (Linnaeus, 1758)]; Naia [sic] anchietae — Boulenger, 1896; Naja haje anchietae — Mertens, 1937; Naja haje anchietae — Bogert, 1943; Naja haje anchietae — Auerbach, 1987; Naja haje anchietae — Spawls & Branch, 1995; Naja annulifera anchietae — Broadley, 1995; Naja anchietae — Broadley & Wüster, 2004; Naja (Uraeus) anchietae — Wallach et al., 2009; Uraeus anchietae — Wallach et al., 2014; Naja (Uraeus) anchietae — Conradie et al., 2016

= Anchieta's cobra =

Species of snake

Anchieta's cobra (Naja anchietae), sometimes referred to as the Angolan cobra, is a species of venomous snake in the family Elapidae. The species is native to Southern Africa.

== Taxonomy ==
Anchieta's cobra was first described by Portuguese zoologist José Vicente Barbosa du Bocage in 1879. The specific epithet, anchietae, refers to José Alberto de Oliveira Anchieta, a Portuguese explorer of Africa.

Along with the snouted cobra (N. haje annulifera), Anchieta's cobra (N. haje anchietae) was formerly regarded as subspecies of the Egyptian cobra (Naja haje), but have since been proven to be distinct species. Based on analysis of character morphology, Broadley (1995) raised Naja annulifera to species level, with Naja annulifera anchietae as a subspecies. More research by Broadley & Wüster (2004) using both analysis of morphology character and mitochondrial DNA (mtDNA) further confirmed that Naja annulifera was a distinct species, but data obtained also showed that Naja anchietae to be a distinct species of its own. Further research by Wallach et al. (2009) placed the Egyptian cobra (N. haje) complex (African non-spitting cobras) into the subgenus Uraeus. The group is distinguished from all other cobras due to the presence of a row of subocular scales separating the eye from the supralabials. Although the Cape cobra (Naja nivea) lacks this feature, it too was placed within the subgenus Uraeus. The below cladogram illustrates the taxonomy and relationships among species of Naja:

- Naja
  - (Naja)
    - Naja (Naja) naja
    - - - Naja (Naja) kaouthia
        - Naja (Naja) atra
      - - Naja (Naja) mandalayensis
        - Naja (Naja) siamensis
        - Naja (Naja) sputatrix
  - - (Afronaja)
      - - Naja (Afronaja) pallida
        - Naja (Afronaja) nubiae
      - - Naja (Afronaja) katiensis
        - - Naja (Afronaja) nigricollis
          - - Naja (Afronaja) ashei
            - - Naja (Afronaja) mossambica
              - Naja (Afronaja) nigricincta
    - - (Boulengerina)
        - Naja (Boulengerina) multifasciata
        - - - Naja (Boulengerina) christyi
            - Naja (Boulengerina) annulata
          - Naja (Boulengerina) melanoleuca
      - (Uraeus)
        - Naja (Uraeus) nivea
        - - Naja (Uraeus) senegalensis
          - - Naja (Uraeus) haje
            - Naja (Uraeus) arabica
          - - Naja (Uraeus) annulifera
            - Naja (Uraeus) anchietae

== Description ==
Anchieta's cobra is a moderately sized species of cobra that has a moderately slender body and a medium length tail. This cobra species can easily be identified by its relatively large and quite impressive hood, which it expands when threatened. It has a broad and flattened head, which is slightly distinct from the neck. The snout is rounded, similar to that of the snouted cobra (N. annulifera). The eye is medium in size with a round pupil. Adults average around 1.0 metre (3.3 ft) in total length (including tail), but it is not uncommon to find specimens measuring between 1.2 metres (3.9 ft) and 1.8 metres (5.9 ft) in length. Maximum size attained by this species is just a bit over 2.0 metres (6.6 ft), but these are rare cases. The longest recorded male was 2.31 metres (7.6 ft) long and was caught in Windhoek, Namibia. The longest recorded female was slightly shorter at 2.18 metres (7.2 ft) and was found 25 kilometres (16 mi) south of Shakawe, Botswana. There is no sexual dimorphism in this species of cobra, with males and females growing to similar sizes. Although like other cobra species, males will normally have larger heads and longer tails than females.

Young specimens are yellowish to light brown in colour, above and below, dorsally with dark scale margins forming a pattern of irregular transverse lines and a black band that circles the neck. As they mature into adulthood, this species gradually darkens to a darker brown colour, while the band on the neck fades away. The ventral scales are often yellow with dark brown blotches, and the throat band, which covers ventral scales 12–23, turns blue-black. A banded phase sometimes occurs in the most southern parts of the species' range, black with six to eight yellow bands on the body and one to three on the tail. The light bands are often as wider than the dark ones. This banded phase has been noted in roughly 13% of males and up to 22% of females. Although Branch claims that the banded phase is more common among males above 60 centimetres (24 in) in length.

=== Scalation ===
Dorsal scales are smooth, shiny, without pits and oblique. Midbody scales are in 17 rows with 179–200 ventrals. There are 51–56 paired subcaudals and the anal shield is entire. There are 7 (sometimes 8) upper labials that do not enter the eye and 8 or 9 (rarely 10) lower labials, as well as 1 preocular and 2 postoculars. Temporals are variable, 1+2 or 1+3.

== Distribution and habitat ==
This species, N. anchietae, is limited to parts of southwestern Africa. It can be found in southern Angola, central and northern Namibia, northern Botswana, western Zambia and parts of northwestern Zimbabwe, with one record from Katanga, Democratic Republic of the Congo. The preferred habitat of N. anchietae is mesic savanna grasslands, particularly bushveld and lowveld. It occurs in semi-deserts and rocky areas, as well as in or close to humans settlements, where they may shelter under houses. It is abundant in wooded areas, especially along rivers and wetlands. This cobra is never found in forest or desert regions. Although usually found at low altitudes, it has on occasion been observed at elevations of 2,000 metres (6,600 ft) above sea level.

== Behaviour and ecology ==
The Anchieta's cobra is a terrestrial or ground-dwelling species, but it may occasionally be found in small shrubs. A nocturnal species, this cobra species emerges at dusk to forage for food, often getting into poultry runs. During the day it is often seen basking in the sun near a preferred retreat, usually an abandoned termite mound, a hole in a rock, hollow tree, and shrubs or under dense vegetation. The Anchieta's cobra is closely related to the Snouted cobra and the two species are very similar in behaviour, morphology and habits, though the Anchieta's cobra tends to be more aggressive when confronted by a threat, showing a tendency to engage threats longer than its close relative, the snouted cobra. This species, like other cobras, will lift its forebody off the ground, spread its impressively broad 10 to 12 centimetres (3.9 to 4.7 in) hood and assume a defensive posture when provoked, however, it will flee when given the chance. This species has been known to feign death as defence mechanism against possible predators or when it is cornered, although it does not display this behaviour as often as the rinkhals (Hemachatus haemachatus) does.

=== Diet ===
This cobra, N. anchietae is a feeding generalist, preying on amphibians such as toads and frogs, other reptiles including lizards and other snakes, birds (including poultry), birds eggs, which it can swallow whole and mammals such as rats and mice.

=== Predators ===
The Anchieta's cobra is preyed upon by birds of prey, such as secretary birds and snake eagles and mammalian carnivores such as honey badgers. It is also prey to the white-throated monitor (Varanus albigularis).

== Reproduction ==
Like other cobras, N. anchietae is oviparous, laying between 47 and 60 eggs in early summer. Hatchlings average between 220 to 340 millimetres (22 to 34 cm; 8.7 to 13.4 in) in length and are completely independent at birth.

== Venom ==
Venom of this species, N. anchietae, is primarily a potent neurotoxin, but may also contain cardiotoxic components. As a species of moderate size with relatively large fangs, it can inject relatively large volumes of venom in a single bite. Although rare, bites have been known to cause human fatalities.
