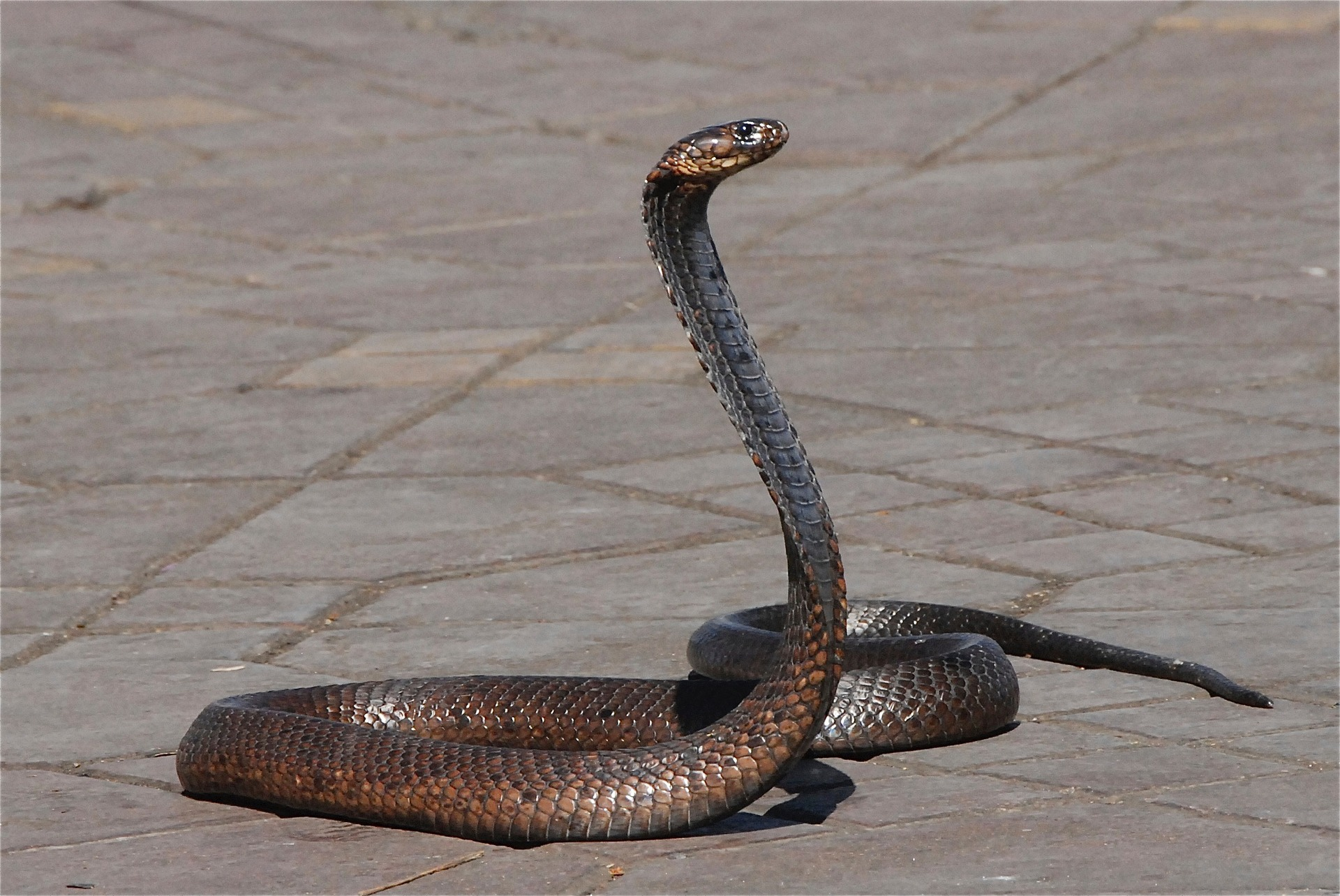
- Naja haje (Moroccan morph)

Conservation status
- Least Concern (IUCN 3.1)

Scientific classification
- Kingdom: Animalia
- Phylum: Chordata
- Class: Reptilia
- Order: Squamata
- Suborder: Serpentes
- Family: Elapidae
- Genus: Naja
- Subgenus: Uraeus
- Species: N. haje

Binomial name
- Naja haje (Linnaeus, 1758)
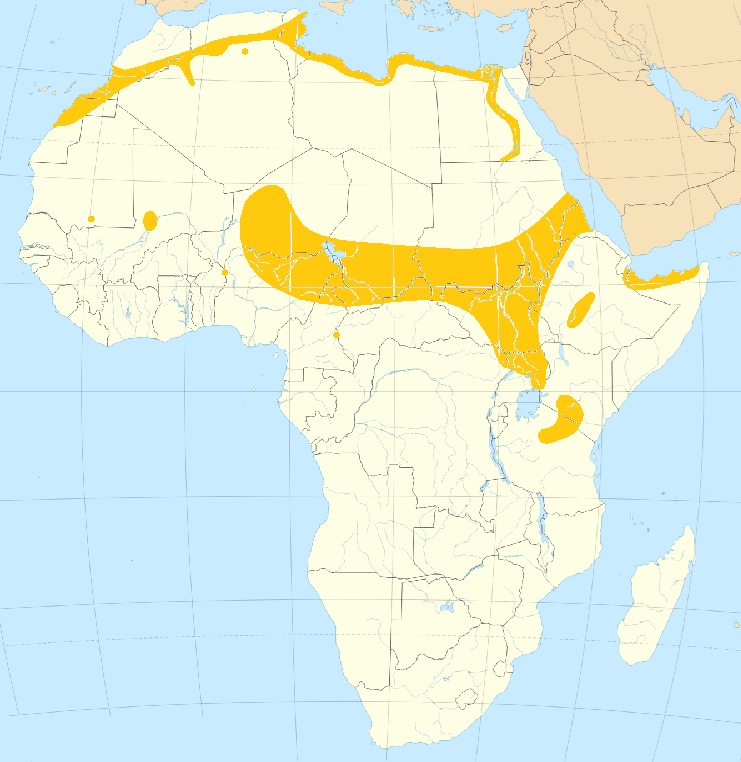

Synonyms
- Coluber haje Linnaeus, 1758 (protonym); Vipera haje — Daudin, 1803; Naja haje — Merrem, 1820

= Egyptian cobra =

Species of snake

The Egyptian cobra (Naja haje) is an elapid venomous snake species in the genus Naja. It is one of the most venomous species of snakes inhabiting Northern Africa. The venom of the Egyptian cobra can be lethal to humans and consists mostly of neurotoxins and cytotoxins. Unlike most other cobras, the species does not spit venom. It averages roughly 1.4 metres (4.6 ft) in length; the longest specimen recorded so far measured 2.59 metres (8.5 ft). The species varies highly in color, ranging from shades of brown, copper-red, grey-brown to black. It mostly preys on toads but is also known to prey on small mammals, birds, lizards, and other snakes.

Naja haje was represented in Egyptian mythology by the goddess Meretseger. A stylised Egyptian cobra in the form of the uraeus representing the goddess Wadjet was the symbol of sovereignty for the Pharaohs, who incorporated it into their diadem. The snake was believed to be the cause of death of the Egyptian queen Cleopatra by ancient sources.

== Etymology and Taxonomy ==
Naja haje was first described in Europe by Swedish zoologist Carl Linnaeus in 1758. The generic name naja is a Latinisation of the Sanskrit word nāgá (नाग) meaning "cobra". The specific epithet haje is derived from the Arabic word ḥayya (حية) which means "snake". The snouted cobra (Naja annulifera) and Anchieta's cobra (Naja anchietae) were formerly regarded as subspecies of Naja haje, but have since been shown to be distinct species. The Arabian populations were long recognised as a separate subspecies, Naja haje arabica, and the black populations from Morocco sometimes as Naja haje legionis. A 2009 study found that the Arabian cobra constitutes a separate species, Naja arabica, whereas the subspecies legionis was synonymised with N. haje. The same study also identified the West African savanna populations as a separate species and described it as Naja senegalensis.

The cladogram below illustrates the taxonomy and relationships among species of Naja following Van Wallach et al. (2009), with subgenus Uraeus resolved following Trape et al. (2009):

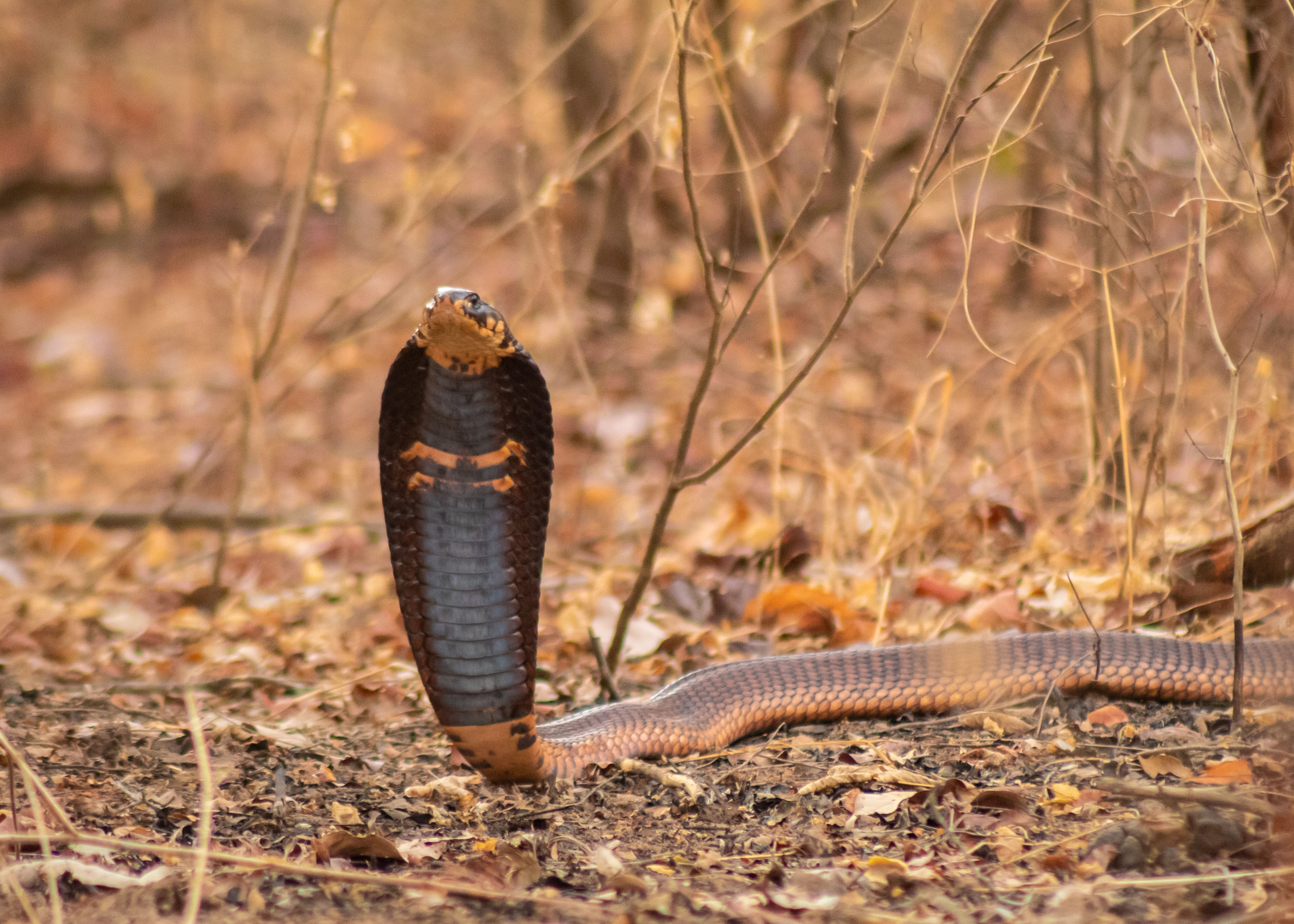
Egyptian cobra observed in Yankari Game Reserve, Nigeria

- Naja
  - (Naja)
    - Naja (Naja) naja
    - - - Naja (Naja) kaouthia
        - Naja (Naja) atra
      - - Naja (Naja) mandalayensis
        - Naja (Naja) siamensis
        - Naja (Naja) sputatrix
  - - (Afronaja)
      - - Naja (Afronaja) pallida
        - Naja (Afronaja) nubiae
      - - Naja (Afronaja) katiensis
        - - Naja (Afronaja) nigricollis
          - - Naja (Afronaja) ashei
            - - Naja (Afronaja) mossambica
              - Naja (Afronaja) nigricincta
    - - (Boulengerina)
        - Naja (Boulengerina) multifasciata
        - - - Naja (Boulengerina) christyi
            - Naja (Boulengerina) annulata
          - Naja (Boulengerina) melanoleuca
      - (Uraeus)
        - Naja (Uraeus) nivea
        - - - Naja (Uraeus) senegalensis
            - - Naja (Uraeus) haje
              - Naja (Uraeus) arabica
          - - Naja (Uraeus) annulifera
            - Naja (Uraeus) anchietae

== Description ==
The Egyptian cobra is a large species. The head is large and depressed and slightly distinct from the neck. The neck of this species has long cervical ribs capable of expanding to form a hood, like all other cobras. The snout of the Egyptian cobra is moderately broad and rounded. The eye is quite big with a round pupil. The body of the Egyptian cobra is cylindrical and stout, with a long tail. The length of the Egyptian cobra is largely dependent on subspecies, geographical locale, and population. The most recognizable characteristics of this species are its head and hood.

The colour is highly variable, but most specimens are some shade of brown, and often a "tear-drop" mark below the eye. Some are more copper-red or grey-brown in colour. Specimens from northwestern Africa (Morocco) are almost entirely black. The ventral side is mostly a creamy white, yellow brown, greyish, blue grey, dark brown or black in colouration, often with dark spots. It averages roughly 1.4 metres (4.6 ft) in length; the longest specimen recorded so far measured 2.59 metres (8.5 ft).

=== Scalation ===
Naja haje has the following scalation pattern: the dorsal scales at midbody number 19–20. The ventral scales number 191–220. The anal plate is single. The subcaudal scales are paired and number 53-65. There is 1 preocular, 3 (or 2) postoculars, and 2 or 3 suboculars. The upper labials number 7 (rarely 6 or 8), and are separated from the eye by the suboculars. The lower labials number 8. The temporal scales are arranged 1+2 or 1+3, varying.

=== Venom ===
The venom of the Egyptian cobra consists mainly of neurotoxins and cytotoxins. The average venom yield is 175 to 300 mg in a single bite, and the murine subcutaneous LD_{50} value is 1.15 mg/kg. However, Mohamed et al. (1973) recorded LD_{50} (mice) values of 0.12 mg/kg and 0.25 mg/kg via intraperitoneal injections of specimens from Egypt. Irwin et al. (1970) studied the venom toxicity of a number of elapids, including Naja haje from different geographical locations. Venom potency ranged from 0.08 mg/kg to 1.7 mg/kg via intravenous injections (IV) on mice. The venom is strong enough to kill a person.

The study also found that Egyptian cobra specimens from northern Africa, particularly those from Egypt, Tunisia, Algeria and Libya, tend to have significantly more potent venom than N. haje specimens found in the species' more southern and western geographical range, including Sudan and those from West Africa (Senegal, Nigeria, and Mali). The Egyptian cobra from Uganda has an IV LD_{50} of 0.43 mg/kg (0.35–0.52 mg/kg) according to Harrison et al. (2017).

The venom affects the nervous system, stopping the nerve signals from being transmitted to the muscles and at later stages stopping those transmitted to the heart and lungs as well, causing death due to complete respiratory failure. Envenomation causes local pain, severe swelling, bruising, blistering, necrosis and variable non-specific effects which may include headache, nausea, vomiting, abdominal pain, diarrhea, dizziness, collapse or convulsions along with possible moderate to severe flaccid paralysis.

Unlike some other African cobras (for example, the red spitting cobra), this species does not spit venom.

== Geographic range ==
The Egyptian cobra ranges across most of North Africa north of the Sahara, across the savannas of West Africa to the south of the Sahara, south to the Congo Basin and east to Kenya and Tanzania. Older literature records from Southern Africa and the Arabian Peninsula refer to other species (as discussed in the taxonomy section).

== Habitat ==
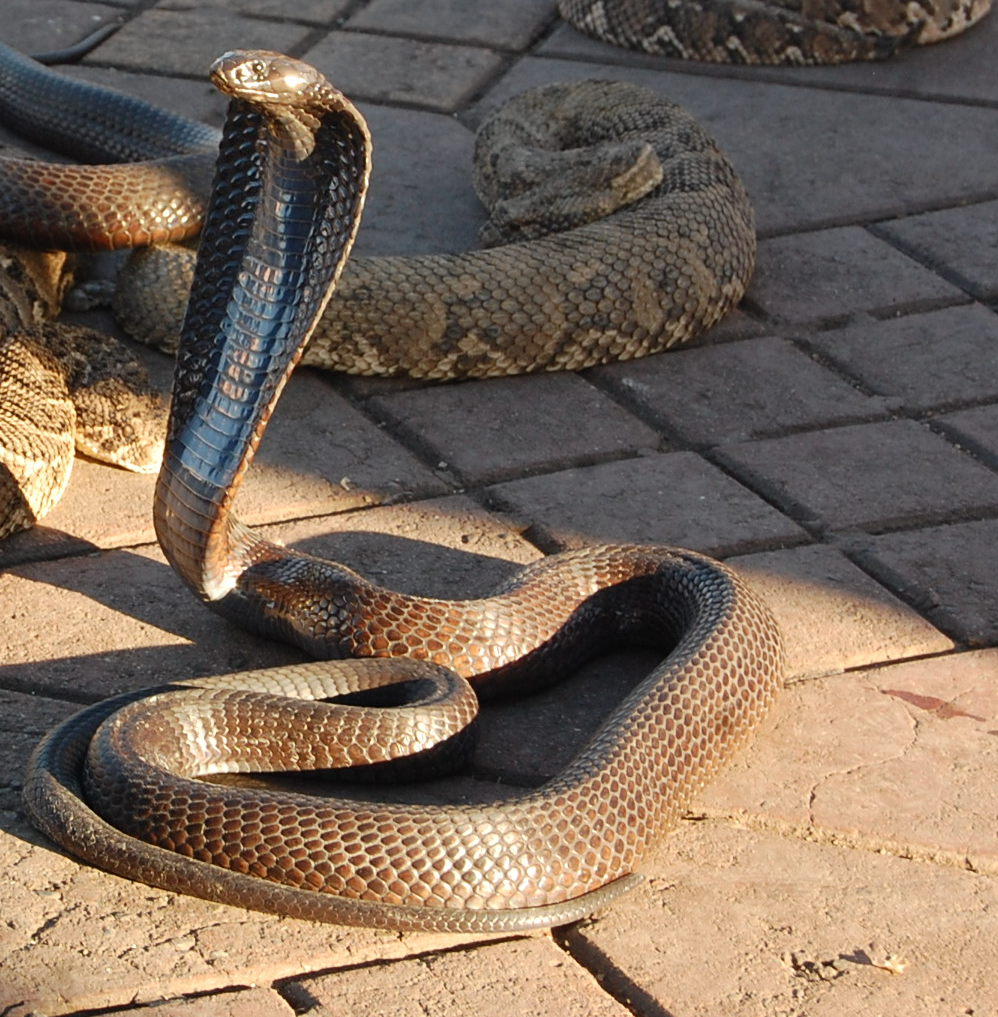
Egyptian cobra, in Morocco

Naja haje occurs in a wide variety of habitats such as steppes, dry to moist savannas, arid semi-desert regions with some water and vegetation. This species is frequently found near water. The Egyptian cobra is also found in agricultural fields and scrub vegetation. It also occurs in the presence of humans, where it often enters houses; Egyptian cobras are attracted to villages by rodent pests (such as rats) and domestic chickens. There are also notes of the Egyptian cobra swimming in the Mediterranean Sea, and is often found in water.

== Behaviour and ecology ==
The Egyptian cobra is a terrestrial and crepuscular or nocturnal species. It can, however, be seen basking in the sun at times in the early morning. This species shows a preference for a permanent home base in abandoned animal burrows, termite mounds or rock outcrops. It is an active forager, sometimes entering human habitations, especially when hunting domestic fowl. Like other cobra species, it generally attempts to escape when approached, at least for a few metres, but if threatened it assumes the typical upright posture with the hood expanded, and strikes. This species prefers to eat toads, but it will prey on small mammals, birds, eggs, lizards, and other snakes. It is an intermediate host of the acanthocephalan parasite Pachysentis ehrenbergi.

== Relation to humans ==
=== Ancient Egypt ===
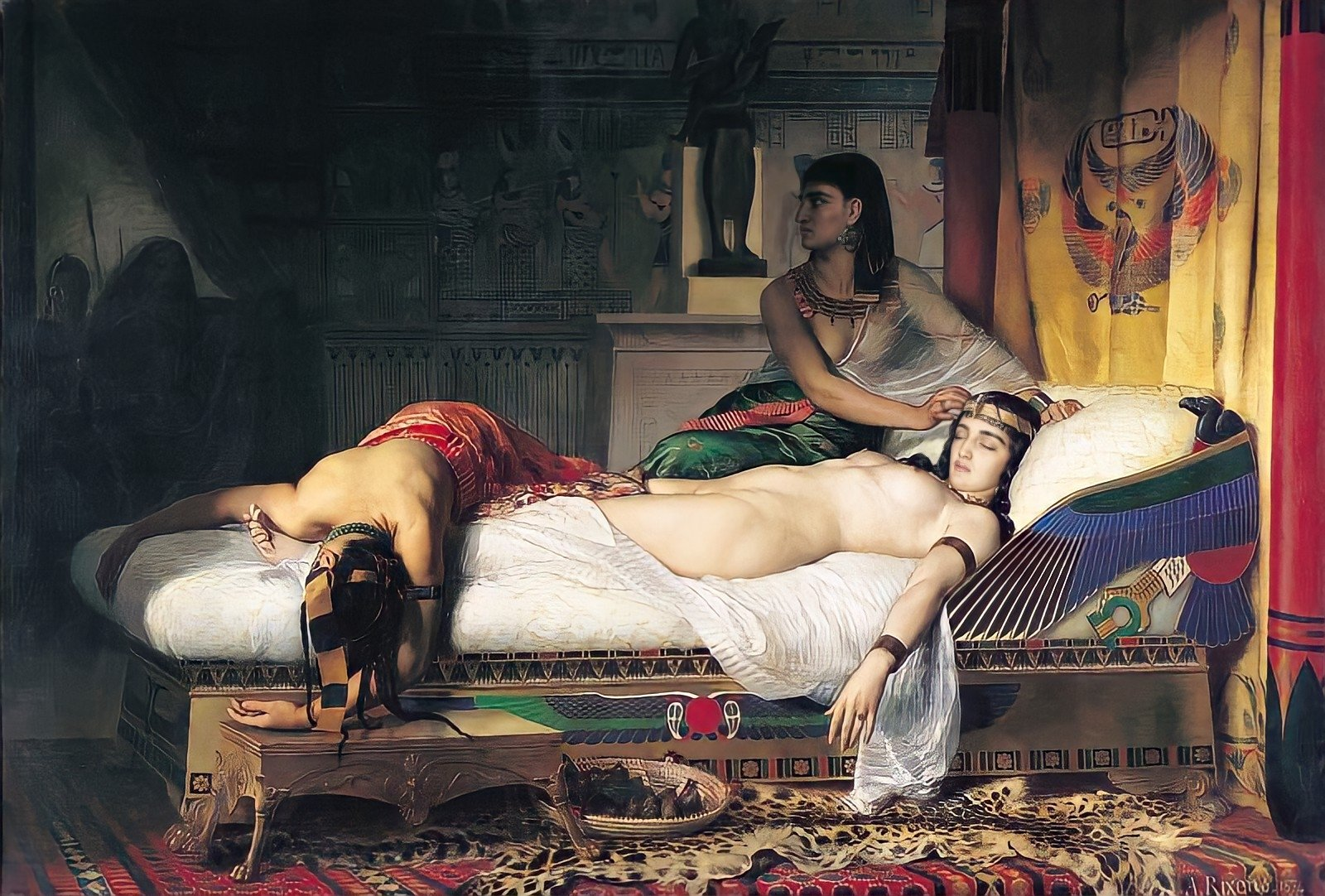
Jean-André Rixens: The Death of Cleopatra (1874)

The Egyptian cobra was represented in Egyptian mythology by the cobra-headed goddess Meretseger. A stylised Egyptian cobra—in the form of the uraeus representing the goddess Wadjet—was the symbol of sovereignty for the Pharaohs, who incorporated it into their diadem. This iconography was continued through the end of the ancient Egyptian civilization (30 BC).

Most ancient sources attribute the deaths of the Egyptian queen Cleopatra and her two handmaidens to the bite of an Egyptian cobra after the fall of Egypt to Octavian. The snake was reportedly smuggled into her chambers in a basket of figs. Plutarch wrote that Cleopatra had experimented on condemned prisoners with various poisons and snake venoms, finding aspis venom to be the most painless of all fatal toxins. In Ptolemaic Egypt, the term "aspis" (an ancient Greek word referring to a wide variety of venomous snakes) was most likely an Egyptian cobra. This aspect of her apparent suicide has been questioned in recent years, as the relatively large size of the snake would have made it difficult to conceal, and because Egyptian cobra venom is slow-acting and does not always cause death.

=== In captivity ===
The Egyptian cobra is found in captivity at zoos, both in and outside the snake's natural range. The Giza Zoo, San Diego Zoo, and the Virginia Aquarium include the Egyptian cobra in their reptile collections.

==== Incidents ====
The Egyptian cobra garnered increased attention in Canada in late 2006, when a pet cobra escaped and forced the evacuation of a house in Toronto for more than five months. It was believed to have sought refuge in the home's walls. The owner was fined 17,000 dollars and jailed for a year.

On 26 March 2011, the Bronx Zoo informed the public that their reptile house was closed after a venomous adolescent female banded Egyptian cobra was discovered missing from its off-exhibit enclosure on 25 March. Zoo officials were confident the missing cobra would be found in the building and not outside, since the Egyptian cobra is known to be uncomfortable in open areas. The snake's metabolism would also have been impacted by the cold weather outdoors at that time in the Bronx. The cobra was found in a dark corner of the zoo's reptile house on 31 March 2011 in good health. After a contest, she was named "Mia" for "missing in action".

In July 2018, illusionist Aref Ghafouri was bitten by an Egyptian cobra while preparing for a show in Turkey. He was evacuated to Egypt for treatment with the antivenom and made a full recovery.
