= Aref Ghafouri =

Turkish illusionist

- Born: 11 December 1989 (age 36); Urmia, Iran
- Citizenship: Iran, Turkey
- Awards: Merlin Award
- Scientific career
- Fields: Illusionist

Aref Ghafouri (Persian: عارف غفوری; born 11 December 1989 in Urmia) is a Turkish-Iranian illusionist who won the Merlin Award. He was known in Yetenek Sizsiniz Türkiye. Ghafouri is a citizen of Turkey.

In July 2018, he was bitten by an Egyptian cobra while preparing for a show in Turkey. He was evacuated to Egypt for treatment with the anti-venom, and made a full recovery. He is of Iranian Azerbaijani descent.
