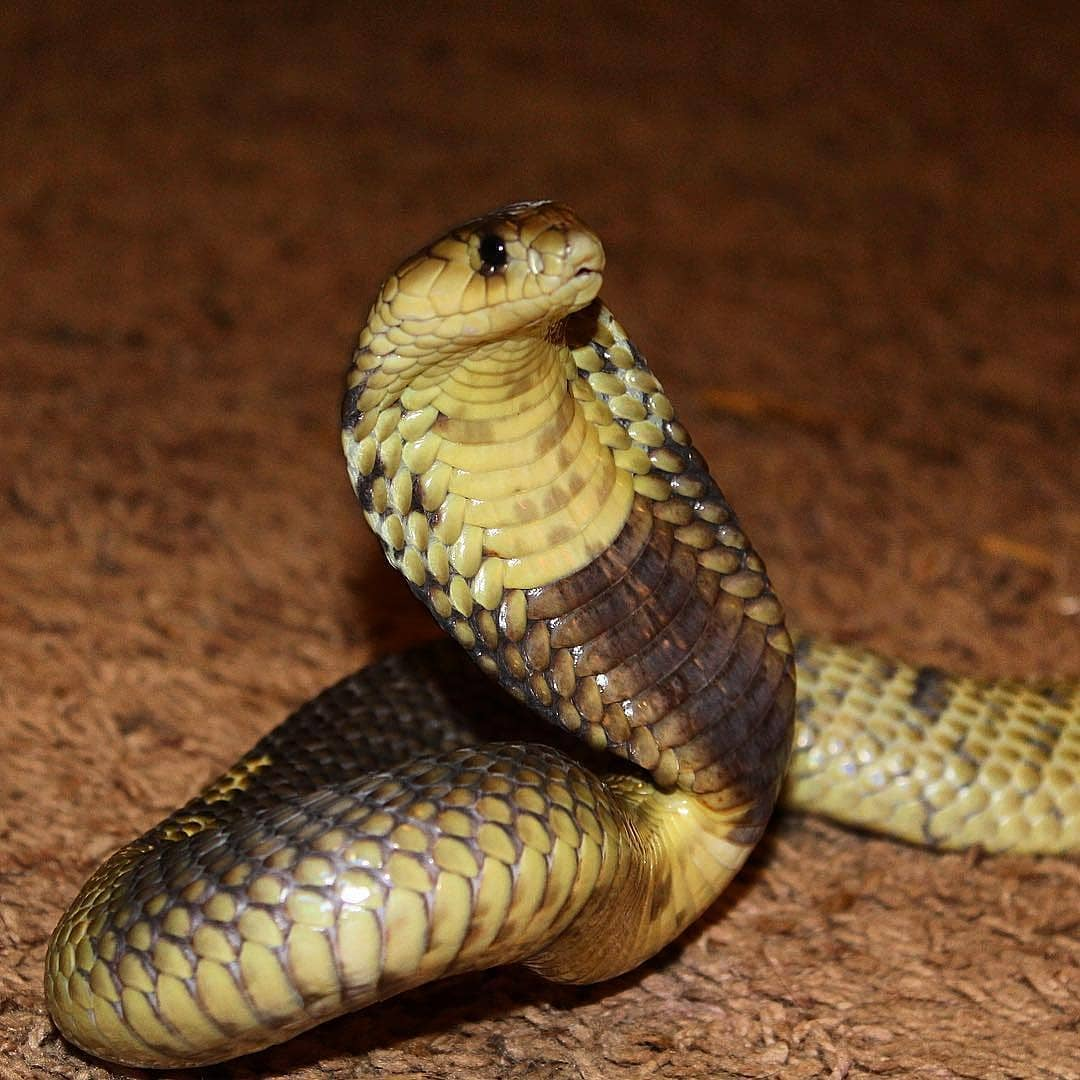

Conservation status
- Least Concern (IUCN 3.1)

Scientific classification
- Domain: Eukaryota
- Kingdom: Animalia
- Phylum: Chordata
- Class: Reptilia
- Order: Squamata
- Suborder: Serpentes
- Family: Elapidae
- Genus: Naja
- Subgenus: Uraeus
- Species: N. annulifera

Binomial name
- Naja annulifera Peters, 1854

Synonyms
- Naja haje var. annulifera Peters, 1854; Naia haie Boulenger, 1887; Naia haie Boulenger, 1896; Naja nigricollis Curtis, 1911; Naja haje haje Bogert, 1943; Naja haje annulifera Auerbach, 1987; Naia haje annulifera Boycott, 1992; Naja haje annulifera Welch, 1994; Naja annulifera Broadley, 1995; Naja (Uraeus) annulifera Wallch, 2009

= Snouted cobra =

Species of snake

The snouted cobra (Naja annulifera), also called the banded Egyptian cobra, is a highly venomous species of cobra found in Southern Africa.

== Description ==
The snouted cobra is a relatively large species. Adult specimens average between 1.2 and 1.8 metres (3.9 and 5.9 ft) in length, but they may reach lengths of 2.5 metres (8.2 ft). Colouration of dorsal scales may vary from yellowish to greyish-brown, dark brown or blue-black. Ventral scale colouration is yellow with darker mottles. A banded phase occurs throughout the species' range and is blue-black with 7-11 yellow to yellow-brown cross bars, the lighter bands being half the width of the darker bands. The latter colour phase is more common in males. Ventrally, it is yellow mottled with black. A darker throat band is present and is usually more prominent in juveniles.

=== Scalation ===
Midbody scales are in 19 rows (rarely 21) with 175-203 ventrals. There are 51-65 paired subcaudals and the anal shield is entire. There are seven (sometimes eight) upper labials that do not enter the eye, eight or 9 (rarely 10) lower labials, as well as one preocular (sometimes two) and two (sometimes one or three) postoculars. Temporals are variable.

== Distribution ==
This species is found in northeast South Africa, southern Mozambique, eastern Botswana, Malawi, throughout Zimbabwe, and parts of Eswatini.

== Habitat and ecology ==
Snouted cobras inhabit arid and moist savanna, particularly in bushveld and lowveld areas. It is not found in forests. As a large cobra, it often has a permanent home base or lair in an abandoned termite mound, where it will reside for years if left undisturbed. It is a nocturnal species, foraging for food from dusk onwards. It enjoys basking in the sun during the day near its lair or retreat. This species can be quite nervous and will strike to defend itself if threatened. Like other cobras, when disturbed, it usually raises the front-third of its body when extending its hood and hissing. Very large adults are able to lift as much as 0.5 m of the body off the ground while spreading a wide, impressive hood. However, given the opportunity, it will escape to the nearest hole or crevice. Like the rinkhals, it may sham death if threatened, but this is rare. It preys on toads, rodents, birds and their eggs, lizards and other snakes, especially puff adders (Bitis arietans). It often raids poultry runs and can become a nuisance. It is preyed upon by birds of prey and other snakes.

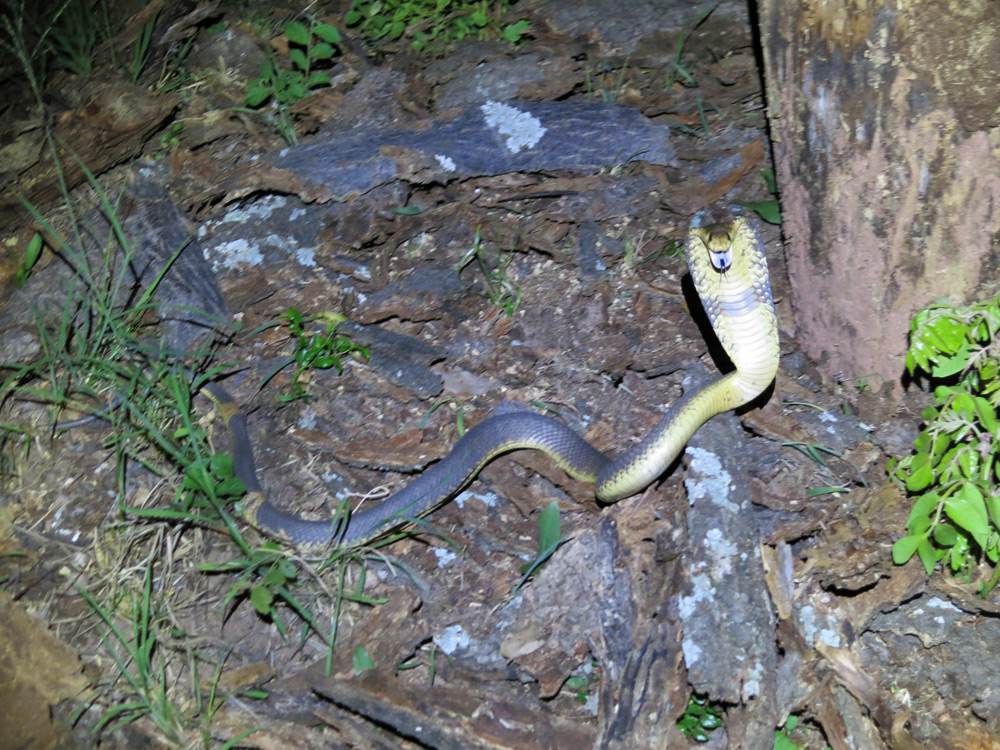
Snouted cobra, Naja annulifera, note the gaping mouth and defensive posture.

== Reproduction ==
This is an oviparous species, laying between 8 and 33 eggs in early summer. The young average 22 to 34 cm (8.7 to 13.4 in) in length.

== Taxonomy ==
It was formerly considered a subspecies of the Egyptian cobra (Naja haje), as was Anchieta's cobra (Naja anchietae). The latter taxon was subsequently considered to be a subspecies of the snouted cobra, before being split off as a distinct species.

== Venom ==
It is a highly venomous species with neurotoxic venom. Intravenous LD_{50} value is 1.98 mg/kg. A bite can affect breathing, and if left untreated, may cause respiratory failure and death. Initial symptoms include pain and local swelling that may result in blistering. Typically, victims are bitten on the lower leg, usually at night.
