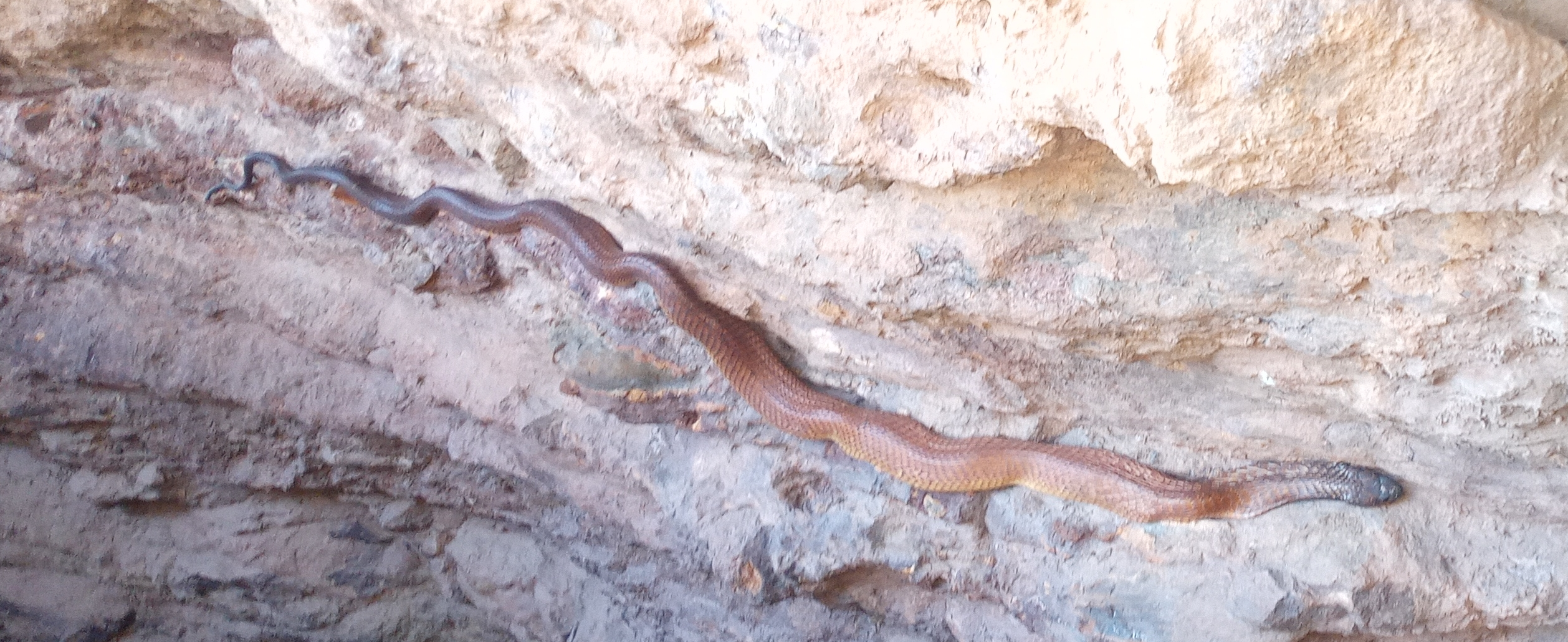
- Arabian cobra in Al-Shabatayn, Yemen

Conservation status
- Least Concern (IUCN 3.1)

Scientific classification
- Kingdom: Animalia
- Phylum: Chordata
- Class: Reptilia
- Order: Squamata
- Suborder: Serpentes
- Family: Elapidae
- Genus: Naja
- Subgenus: Uraeus
- Species: N. arabica

Binomial name
- Naja arabica (Scortecci, 1932)
- Range of Arabian cobra

Synonyms
- Naja haje arabica Scortecci, 1932; Naja (Uraeus) arabica — Wallach et al., 2009; Naja arabica — Trape et al., 2009; Uraeus arabica — Wallach et al., 2014

= Arabian cobra =

Species of snake

The Arabian cobra (Naja arabica) is a species of venomous snake in the family Elapidae. The species is endemic to the Arabian Peninsula.

== Etymology and Taxonomy ==
Naja arabica is classified under the genus Naja of the family Elapidae. It was first described by an Italian herpetologist, Giuseppe Scortecci in 1932. The generic name Naja is a Latinisation of the Sanskrit word nāgá (नाग), meaning "cobra". The specific epithet arabica means "of Arabia" or "Arabic".

This species, Naja arabica, had long been considered a subspecies of the Egyptian cobra (Naja haje), but morphological and genetic differences have led to its recognition as a separate species.

== Distribution ==
The Arabian cobra is found in western Oman, southwestern Saudi Arabia, and throughout Yemen.
