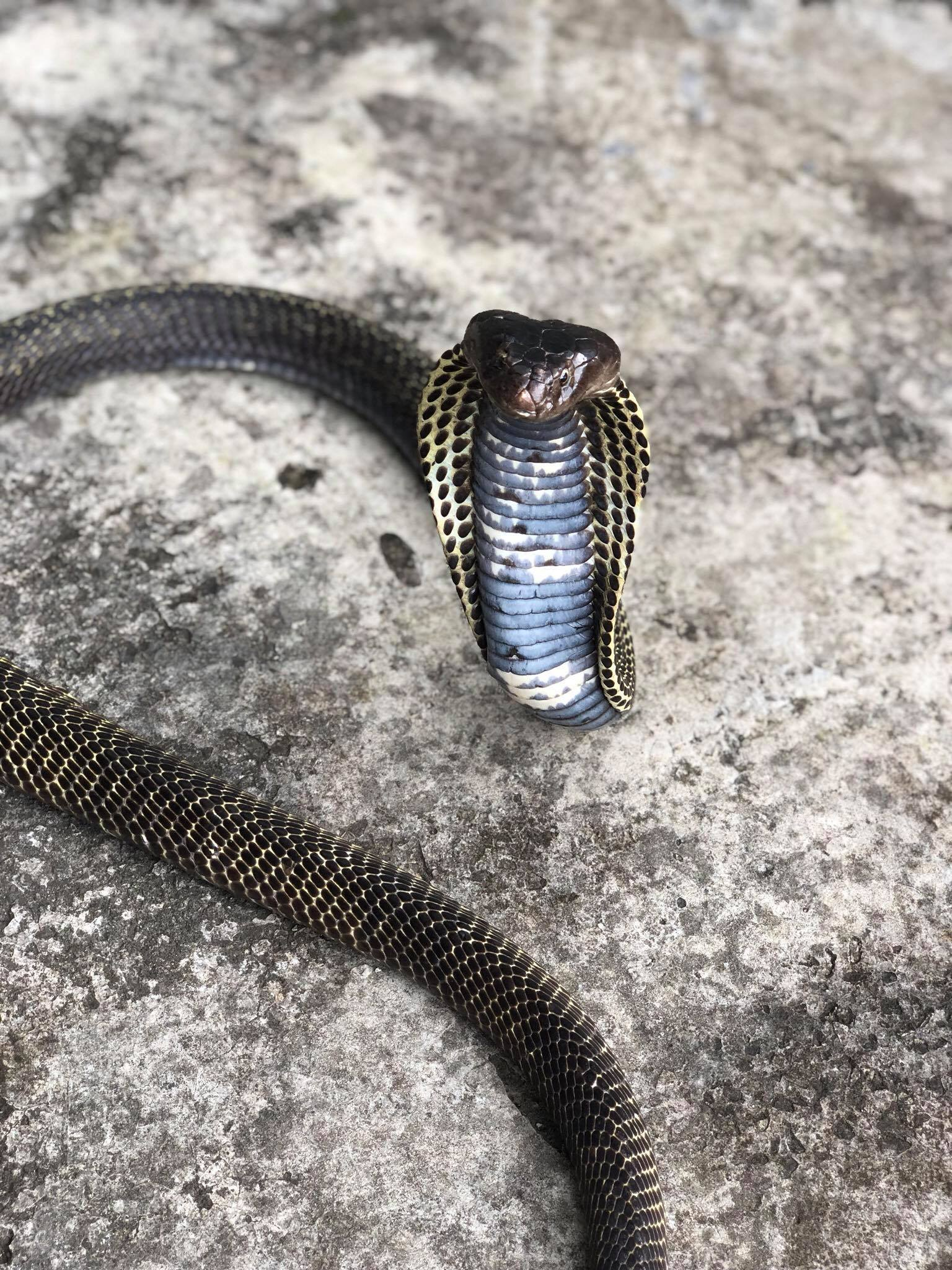

Conservation status
- Vulnerable (IUCN 3.1)
- CITES Appendix II

Scientific classification
- Kingdom: Animalia
- Phylum: Chordata
- Class: Reptilia
- Order: Squamata
- Suborder: Serpentes
- Family: Elapidae
- Genus: Naja; Laurenti, 1768
- Species: N. mandalayensis

Binomial name
- Naja mandalayensis Slowinski & Wüster, 2000
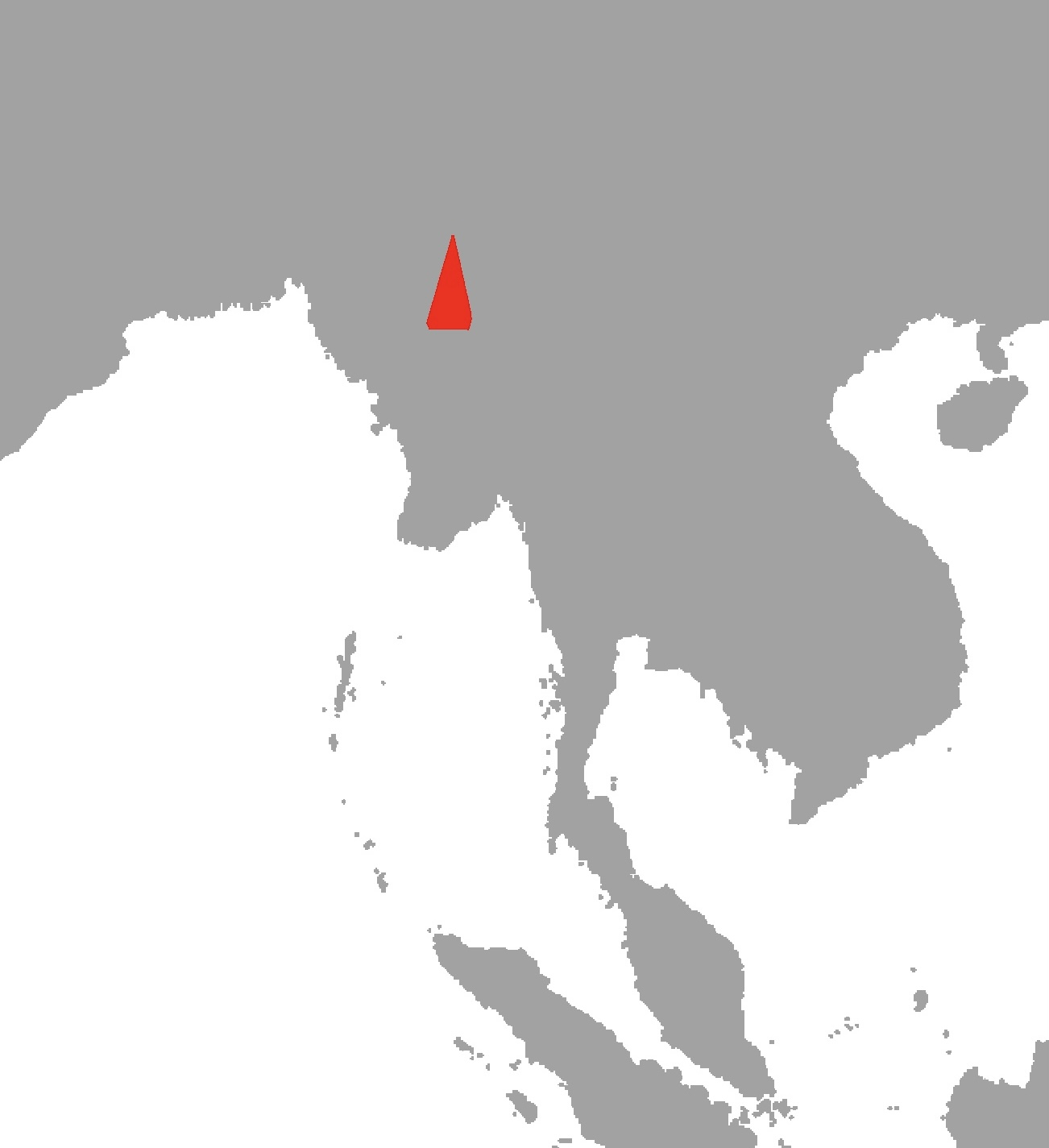

= Mandalay spitting cobra =

Species of snake

The Mandalay spitting cobra (Naja mandalayensis), also called the Burmese spitting cobra or Mandalay cobra, is a species of spitting cobra endemic to the Dry Zone in central Myanmar.

== Etymology ==
Naja mandalayensis was first described by herpetologists Wolfgang Wüster and Joseph Bruno Slowinski in 2000. The generic name naja is a Latinisation of the Sanskrit word nāgá (नाग) meaning "cobra". The specific epithet mandalayensis is Latin and refers to the city of Mandalay, which is a major city within the range of Naja mandalayensis.

== Description ==
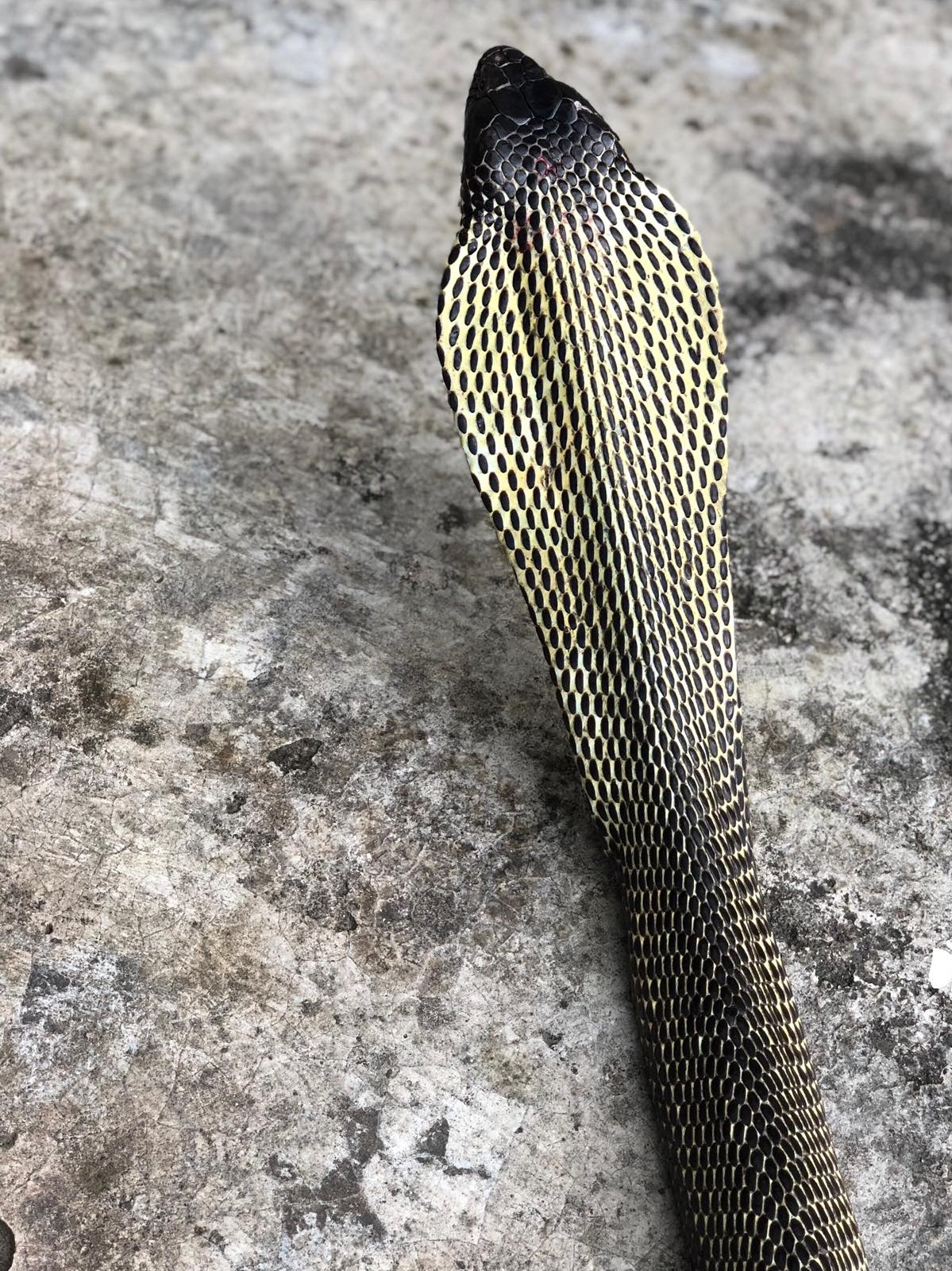
Hood pattern of Mandalay splitting cobra, viewed from back.

This species of cobra is medium in length, and heavy bodied. The average length of an adult ranges from 1 to 1.2 m (3.3 to 3.9 ft); they can grow to 1.4 m (4.6 ft). The head is elliptical, depressed, slightly distinct from the neck with a short, rounded snout and large nostrils. The body is compressed dorsoventrally and subcylindrical posteriorly. Its scales are smooth and strongly oblique. The eyes are moderate in size with round pupils. The body of this species is yellowish-brown to dull brown, with darker brownish mottling. The belly is pale with some dark speckling. Specimens are often dark under the chin and throat, followed by a more pale clear area, then by 2 or 3 dark bands across the venter of the hood. This species has no obvious markings on dorsum of the hood, although a spectacle-shaped hood mark may be present, especially in some juveniles. Like other spitting cobra species, they possess a pair of fixed front upper fangs that are highly modified for "spitting" venom.

== Geographic distribution ==
This species is endemic to the central Dry Zone of Myanmar, spanning the Mandalay, Magway, and Sagaing Divisions. The Dry Zone is a well defined area with a characteristic climate, and an extent of less than 20,000 km^{2}. The few known records of this snake have been taken from areas throughout this general region, and it has an estimated range of approximately 18,500 km^{2} based on recorded data.

== Habitat ==
This species occurs in the central Dry Zone of Myanmar, an area that receives less than 1,000 mm (39 in) of rain annually. The area is made up of acacia and stunted dipterocarpaceae savannas, although the area is being intensively utilized for agricultural purposes. Mandalay spitting cobra specimens have been collected in dry forests and dry acacia habitat.

== Behaviour and diet ==
This species of cobra is predominantly nocturnal, hunting at dusk or night. They spend the daylight hours being mostly stationary or basking in the sun. The spitting behaviour of this species is said to be similar to that of the Indochinese spitting cobra (N. siamensis) based on anecdotal observations made by herpetologists. Mandalay spitting cobras are alert and defensive snakes, quickly raising their forebodies and spreading a broad hood when faced with a threat. Very little provocation is required to cause them to spit. The venom can be efficiently expelled at least 2 m (6.6 ft) in distance. In addition to spitting, this species will often also charge forward towards the threat while hissing loudly, even try to bite.

It preys mainly on toads and frogs but will also take other snakes, small mammals and occasionally even fish.

== Venom ==
Nothing is known about the venom of this particular species. However, as a species of spitting cobra the venom likely has a cytotoxic and post-synaptic neurotoxic properties.
