= Bio-inspired robotics =

Field in robotics

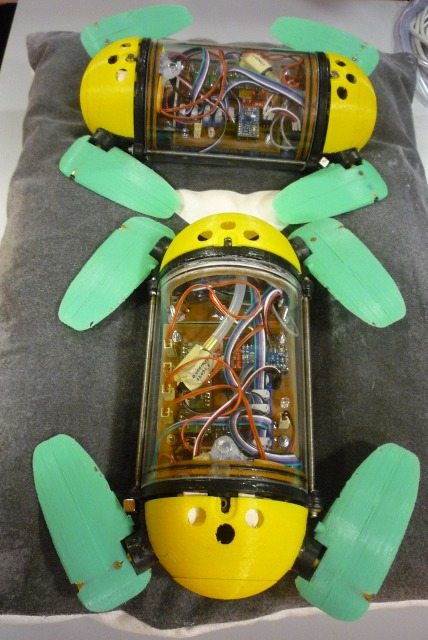
Two u-CAT robots that are being developed at the Tallinn University of Technology to reduce the cost of underwater archaeological operations

Bio-inspired robotic locomotion is a subcategory of bio-inspired design. It is about learning concepts from nature and applying them to the design of real-world engineered systems. More specifically, this field is about making robots that are inspired by biological systems, including Biomimicry. Biomimicry is copying from nature while bio-inspired design is learning from nature and making a mechanism that is simpler and more effective than the system observed in nature. Biomimicry has led to the development of a different branch of robotics called soft robotics. The biological systems have been optimized for specific tasks according to their habitat. However, they are multifunctional and are not designed for only one specific functionality. Bio-inspired robotics is about studying biological systems, and looking for the mechanisms that may solve a problem in the engineering field. The designer should then try to simplify and enhance that mechanism for the specific task of interest. Bio-inspired roboticists are usually interested in biosensors (e.g. eye), bioactuators (e.g. muscle), or biomaterials (e.g. spider silk). Most of the robots have some type of locomotion system. Thus, in this article different modes of animal locomotion and few examples of the corresponding bio-inspired robots are introduced.

Stickybot: a gecko-inspired robot

== Biolocomotion ==
Biolocomotion or animal locomotion is usually categorized as below:

=== Locomotion on a surface ===
Locomotion on a surface may include terrestrial locomotion and arboreal locomotion. We will specifically discuss about terrestrial locomotion in detail in the next section.

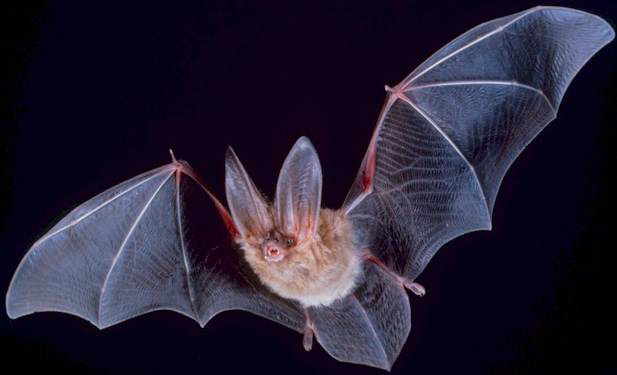
Big eared townsend bat (Corynorhinus townsendii)

=== Locomotion in a fluid ===
Locomotion in a blood stream or cell culture media swimming and flying. There are many swimming and flying robots designed and built by roboticists. Some of them use miniaturized motors or conventional MEMS actuators (such as piezoelectric, thermal, magnetic, etc), while others use animal muscle cells as motors.

== Behavioral classification (terrestrial locomotion) ==
There are many animal and insects moving on land with or without legs. We will discuss legged and limbless locomotion in this section as well as climbing and jumping. Anchoring the feet is fundamental to locomotion on land. The ability to increase traction is important for slip-free motion on surfaces such as smooth rock faces and ice, and is especially critical for moving uphill. Numerous biological mechanisms exist for providing purchase: claws rely upon friction-based mechanisms; gecko feet upon van der walls forces; and some insect feet upon fluid-mediated adhesive forces.

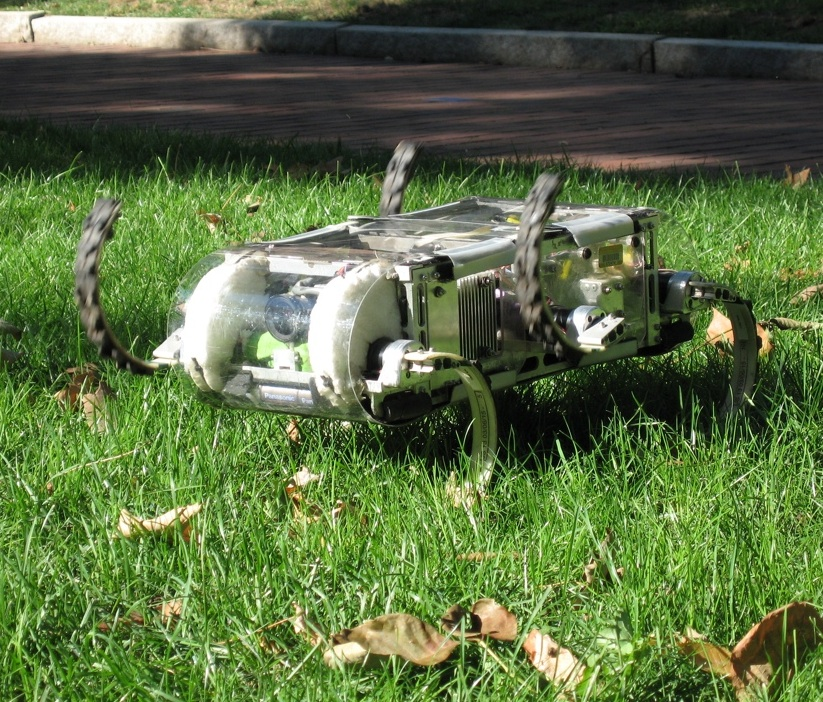
Rhex: a Reliable Hexapedal Robot

=== Legged locomotion ===
Legged robots may have one, two, four, six, or many legs depending on the application. One of the main advantages of using legs instead of wheels is moving on uneven environment more effectively. Bipedal, quadrupedal, and hexapedal locomotion are among the most favorite types of legged locomotion in the field of bio-inspired robotics. Rhex, a Reliable Hexapedal robot and Cheetah are the two fastest running robots so far. iSprawl is another hexapedal robot inspired by cockroach locomotion that has been developed at Stanford University. This robot can run up to 15 body length per second and can achieve speeds of up to 2.3 m/s. The original version of this robot was pneumatically driven while the new generation uses a single electric motor for locomotion.

=== Limbless locomotion ===
Terrain involving topography over a range of length scales can be challenging for most organisms and biomimetic robots. Such terrain are easily passed over by limbless organisms such as snakes. Several animals and insects including worms, snails, caterpillars, and snakes are capable of limbless locomotion. A review of snake-like robots is presented by Hirose et al. These robots can be categorized as robots with passive or active wheels, robots with active treads, and undulating robots using vertical waves or linear expansions. Most snake-like robots use wheels, which are high in friction when moving side to side but low in friction when rolling forward (and can be prevented from rolling backward). The majority of snake-like robots use either lateral undulation or rectilinear locomotion and have difficulty climbing vertically. Choset has recently developed a modular robot that can mimic several snake gaits, but it cannot perform concertina motion. Researchers at Georgia Tech have recently developed two snake-like robots called Scalybot. The focus of these robots is on the role of snake ventral scales on adjusting the frictional properties in different directions. These robots can actively control their scales to modify their frictional properties and move on a variety of surfaces efficiently. Researchers at CMU have developed both scaled and conventional actuated snake-like robots.

=== Climbing ===
Climbing is an especially difficult task because mistakes made by the climber could cause the climber to lose its grip and fall. Most robots have been built around a single functionality observed in their biological counterparts. Geckobots typically use van der waals forces that work only on smooth surfaces. Being inspired from geckos, scientists from Stanford university have artificially created the adhesive property of a gecko. Similar to seta in a gecko's leg, millions of microfibers were placed and attached to a spring. The tip of the microfiber will be sharp and pointed in usual circumstances, but upon actuation, the movement of a spring will create a stress which bends these microfibers and increase their contact area to the surface of a glass or wall. Using the same technology, gecko grippers were invented by NASA scientists for different applications in space. Stickybots use directional dry adhesives that works best on smooth surfaces. The Spinybot and RiSE robots are among the insect-like robots that use spines instead. Legged climbing robots have several limitations. They cannot handle large obstacles since they are not flexible and they require a wide space for moving. They usually cannot climb both smooth and rough surfaces or handle vertical to horizontal transitions as well.

=== Jumping ===
One of the tasks commonly performed by a variety of living organisms is jumping. Bharals, hares, kangaroos, grasshoppers, fleas, and locusts are among the best jumping animals. A miniature 7g jumping robot inspired by locusts has been developed at EPFL that can jump up to 138 cm. The jump event is induced by releasing the tension of a spring. The highest jumping miniature robot is inspired by the locust, weighs 23 grams with its highest jump to 365 cm is "TAUB" (Tel-Aviv University and Braude College of engineering). It uses torsion springs as energy storage and includes a wire and latch mechanism to compress and release the springs. ETH Zurich has reported a soft jumping robot based on the combustion of methane and laughing gas. The thermal gas expansion inside the soft combustion chamber drastically increases the chamber volume. This causes the 2 kg robot to jump up to 20 cm. The soft robot inspired by a roly-poly toy then reorientates itself into an upright position after landing.

== Behavioral classification (aquatic locomotion) ==
=== Swimming (piscine) ===
It is calculated that when swimming some fish can achieve a propulsive efficiency greater than 90%. Furthermore, they can accelerate and maneuver far better than any man-made boat or submarine, and produce less noise and water disturbance. Therefore, many researchers studying underwater robots would like to copy this type of locomotion. Notable examples are the Essex University Computer Science Robotic Fish G9, and the Robot Tuna built by the Institute of Field Robotics, to analyze and mathematically model thunniform motion. The Aqua Penguin, designed and built by Festo of Germany, copies the streamlined shape and propulsion by front "flippers" of penguins. Festo have also built the Aqua Ray and Aqua Jelly, which emulate the locomotion of manta ray, and jellyfish, respectively.

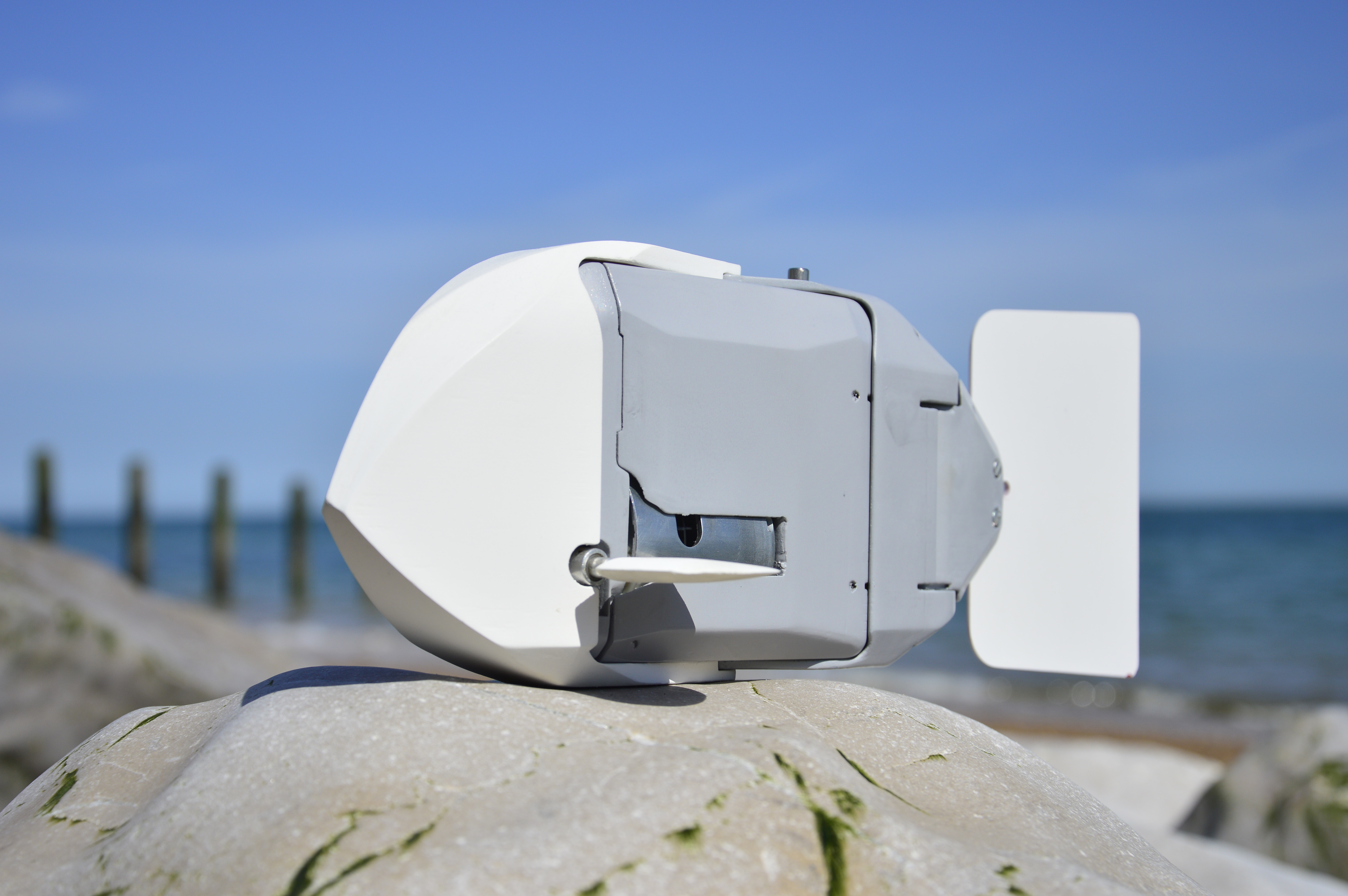
Robotic Fish: iSplash-II

In 2014, iSplash-II was developed by PhD student Richard James Clapham and Prof. Huosheng Hu at Essex University. It was the first robotic fish capable of outperforming real carangiform fish in terms of average maximum velocity (measured in body lengths/ second) and endurance, the duration that top speed is maintained. This build attained swimming speeds of 11.6BL/s (i.e. 3.7 m/s). The first build, iSplash-I (2014) was the first robotic platform to apply a full-body length carangiform swimming motion which was found to increase swimming speed by 27% over the traditional approach of a posterior confined waveform.

== Morphological classification ==
=== Modular ===
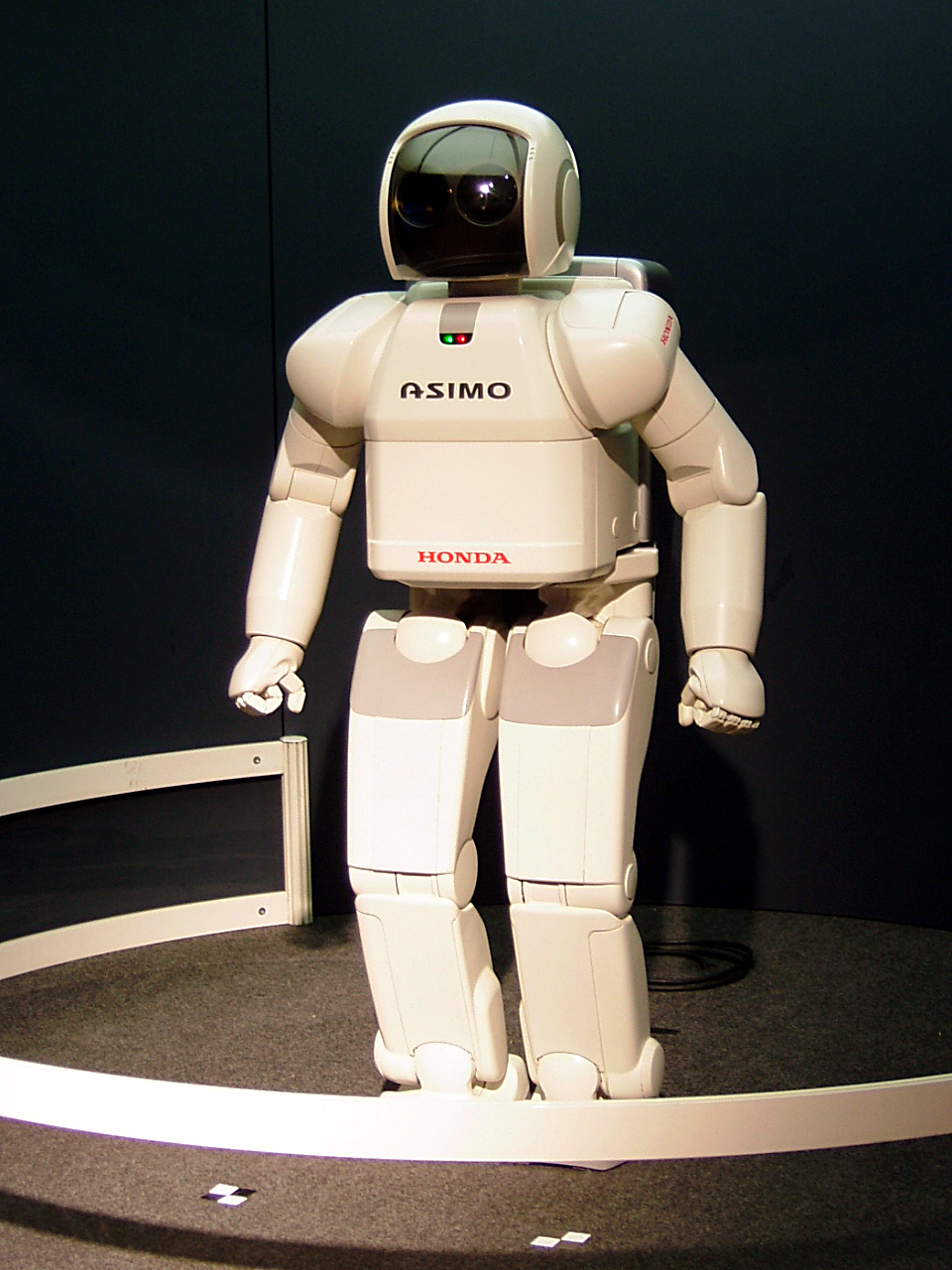
Honda Asimo: A Humanoid robot

The modular robots are typically capable of performing several tasks and are specifically useful for search and rescue or exploratory missions. Some of the featured robots in this category include a salamander inspired robot developed at EPFL that can walk and swim, a snake inspired robot developed at Carnegie-Mellon University that has four different modes of terrestrial locomotion, and a cockroach inspired robot can run and climb on a variety of complex terrain.

=== Humanoid ===
Humanoid robots are robots that look human-like or are inspired by the human form. There are many different types of humanoid robots for applications such as personal assistance, reception, work at industries, or companionship. These types of robots are used for research purposes as well and were originally developed to build better orthosis and prosthesis for human beings. Petman is one of the first and most advanced humanoid robots developed at Boston Dynamics. Some of the humanoid robots such as Honda Asimo are over actuated. On the other hand, there are some humanoid robots like the robot developed at Cornell University that do not have any actuators and walk passively descending a shallow slope.

=== Swarming ===
The collective behavior of animals has been of interest to researchers for several years. Ants can make structures like rafts to survive on rivers. Fish can sense their environment more effectively in large groups. Swarm robotics is a fairly new field and the goal is to make robots that can work together, transfer data, and construct structures collectively.

Recent research has investigated bio-inspired coordination algorithms, communication strategies, and system architectures for underwater swarm robotics, drawing inspiration from collective behaviours observed in marine organisms such as fish schools and other forms of biological swarms.

=== Soft ===
Soft robots are robots composed entirely of soft materials and moved through pneumatic pressure, similar to an octopus or starfish. Such robots are flexible enough to move in very limited spaces (such as in the human body). The first multigait soft robots was developed in 2011 and the first fully integrated, independent soft robot (with soft batteries and control systems) was developed in 2015.

== See also ==
- Animal locomotion
- Biomimetics
- Biorobotics
- Biomechatronics
- Biologically inspired engineering
- Robotic materials
- Lists of types of robots
