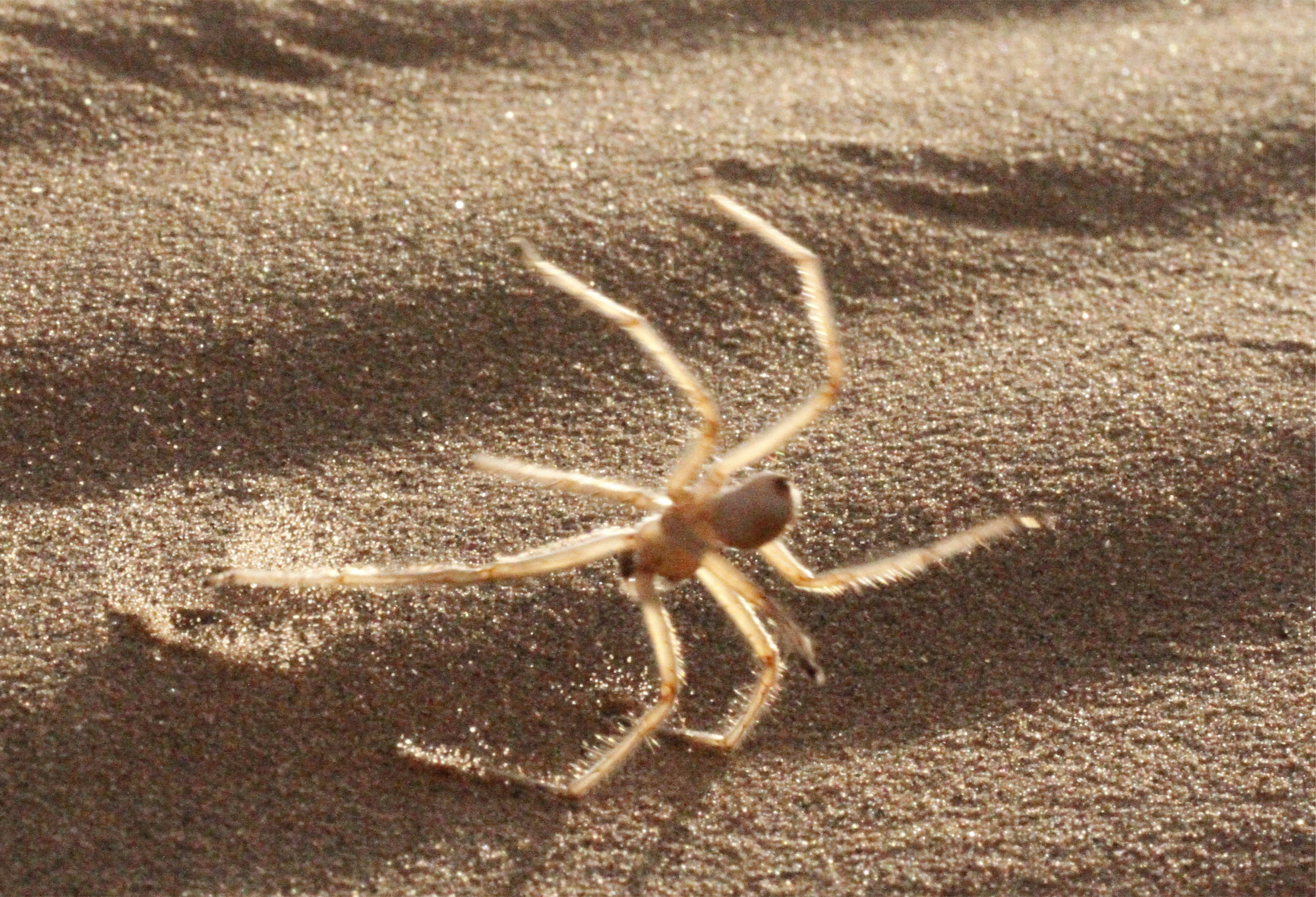
- C. rechenbergi

Scientific classification
- Kingdom: Animalia
- Phylum: Arthropoda
- Subphylum: Chelicerata
- Class: Arachnida
- Order: Araneae
- Infraorder: Araneomorphae
- Family: Sparassidae
- Genus: Cebrennus; Simon, 1880

Type species
- C. wagae (Simon, 1874)

Species
- 19, see text

Synonyms
- Cerbalopsis Jézéquel & Junqua, 1966

= Cebrennus =

Genus of spiders

Cebrennus is a genus of huntsman spiders that was first described by Eugène Louis Simon in 1880. It is considered a senior synonym of Cerbalopsis.

The Moroccan flic-flac spider (C. rechenbergi), that uses a flic-flac motion to escape threats, was first described in 2014.

== Species ==
As of September 2025 it contains twenty-one species, found in Africa, Asia, and parts of Europe (on Malta, and in Spain):

- Cebrennus aethiopicus Simon, 1880 – Egypt, Ethiopia, Eritrea, Sudan, Djibouti, Saudi Arabia
- Cebrennus atlas Jäger, 2014 – Morocco
- Cebrennus castaneitarsis Simon, 1880 – Algeria to Israel
- Cebrennus concolor (Denis, 1947) – Egypt
- Cebrennus cultrifer Fage, 1921 – Algeria
- Cebrennus flagellatus Jäger, 2014 – Afghanistan
- Cebrennus herculis Domènech, Pérez-Gómez & Calatayud-Mascarell, 2025 – Spain
- Cebrennus intermedius Jäger, 2000 – Saudi Arabia
- Cebrennus kazakhstanicus Fomichev & Marusik, 2022 – Kazakhstan
- Cebrennus kochi (O. Pickard-Cambridge, 1872) – Syria, Israel
- Cebrennus laurae Jäger, 2014 – Canary Is.
- Cebrennus logunovi Jäger, 2000 – Turkmenistan
- Cebrennus mayri Jäger, 2000 – Oman
- Cebrennus powelli Fage, 1921 – Morocco
- Cebrennus rambodjavani Moradmand, Zamani & Jäger, 2016 – Iran
- Cebrennus rechenbergi Jäger, 2014 – Morocco
- Cebrennus rungsi Jäger, 2000 – Morocco
- Cebrennus sumer Al-Khazali & Jäger, 2019 – Iraq
- Cebrennus tunetanus Simon, 1885 – Tunisia
- Cebrennus villosus (Jézéquel & Junqua, 1966) – Algeria, Tunisia
- Cebrennus wagae (Simon, 1874) (type) – Malta, Algeria, Tunisia, Libya
