= Carparachne =

Scientific classification
- Kingdom: Animalia
- Phylum: Arthropoda
- Subphylum: Chelicerata
- Class: Arachnida
- Order: Araneae
- Infraorder: Araneomorphae
- Family: Sparassidae
- Genus: Carparachne; Lawrence, 1962

Type species
- C. alba Lawrence, 1962

Species
- C. alba Lawrence, 1962 – Namibia; C. aureoflava Lawrence, 1966 – Namibia

Genus of spiders

Carparachne is a genus of Namibian huntsman spiders that was first described by R. F. Lawrence in 1962. As of September 2019 it contains two species, found in Namibia: C. alba and C. aureoflava. The golden wheel spider (C. aureoflava) uses cartwheeling to move across hot, sandy ground, similar to the related Cebrennus rechenbergi, which uses a flic-flac motion.
