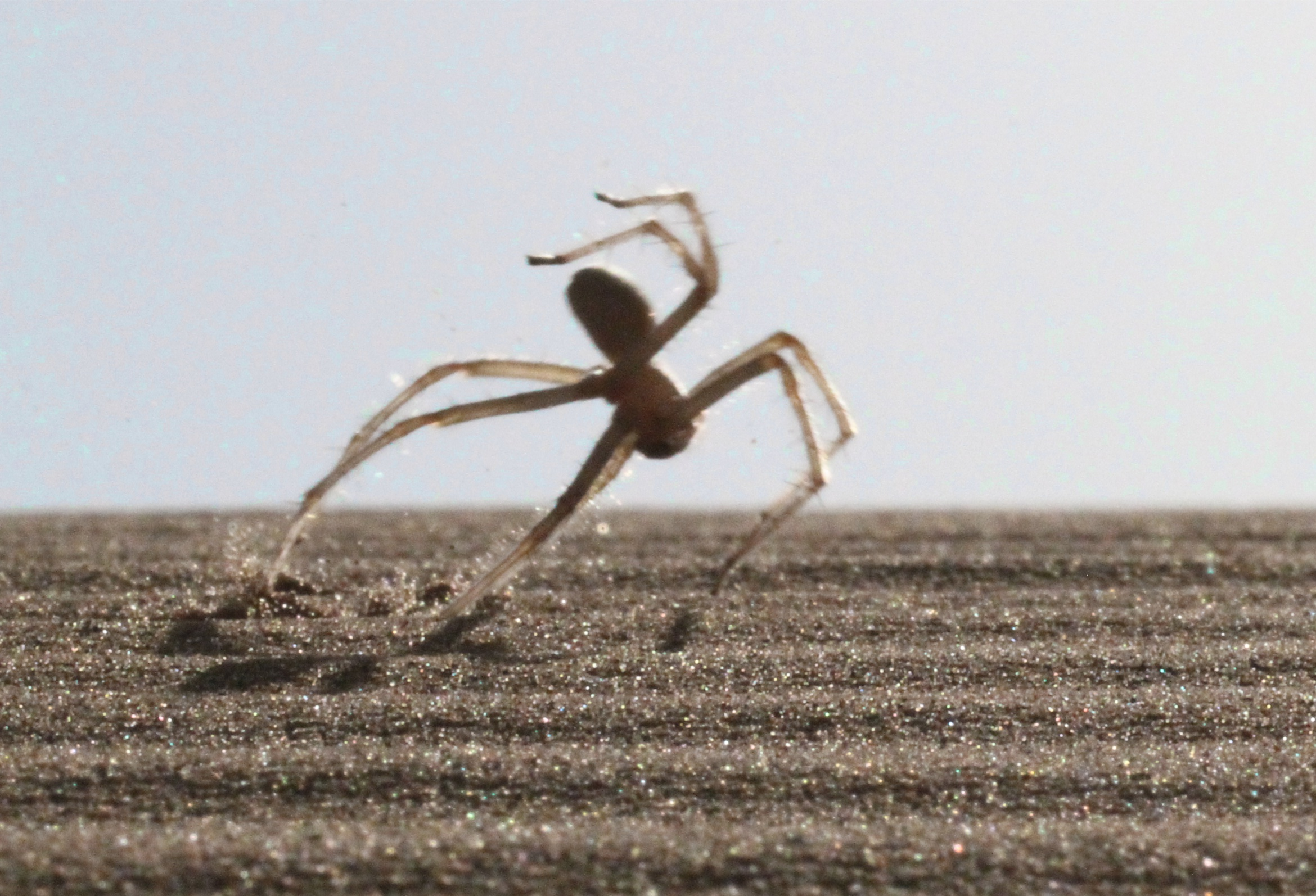
- Cebrennus rechenbergi rolling across the sand.

Scientific classification
- Kingdom: Animalia
- Phylum: Arthropoda
- Subphylum: Chelicerata
- Class: Arachnida
- Order: Araneae
- Infraorder: Araneomorphae
- Family: Sparassidae
- Genus: Cebrennus
- Species: C. rechenbergi

Binomial name
- Cebrennus rechenbergi Peter Jäger, 2014
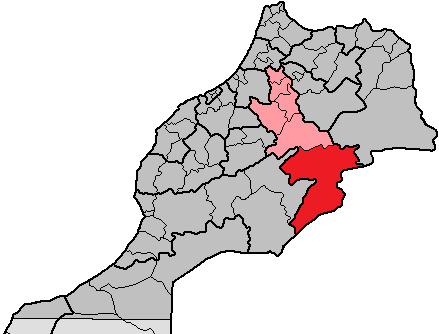
- Map of Morocco with the Errachidia Province in dark red, the region where Cebrennus rechenbergi lives

= Cebrennus rechenbergi =

Species of spider

Cebrennus rechenbergi, also known as the Moroccan flic-flac spider and cartwheeling spider, is a species of huntsman spider indigenous to the sand dunes of the Erg Chebbi desert in Morocco. If provoked or threatened it can escape by doubling its normal walking speed using forward or backward flips similar to acrobatic flic-flac movements used by gymnasts. C. rechenbergi is the only spider known to use this unique form of rolling locomotion. The discovery of the Moroccan flic-flac spider has influenced biomimetic robot research, resulting in the development of an experimental robot based on the spider's motion.

== Etymology ==
The spider is named after its discoverer, Ingo Rechenberg, bionics professor at the Technische Universität Berlin. Rechenberg may have first encountered the spider on a trip to Morocco as early as 2006, but it was not until 2008 that he collected the first specimen. It was initially confused with the Tunisian spider Cebrennus villosus, but later identified as a separate species by Peter Jäger of the Senckenberg Nature Research Society. After observing small variations in the genitalia of the two species and noticing the distinctive flic-flac motion of the spider, Jäger confirmed its status as a new species. The holotype is dated 15 July 2009.

== Description ==
Jäger describes C. rechenbergi as a medium-sized huntsman spider. Male bodies measure 13.8 to 19.0 mm (0.54 to 0.75 in) long; female bodies measure 19 to 19.5 mm (0.75 to 0.77 in) long. Males and females are similarly colored white with black scopulae on their ventral legs, and yellow coloring on their dorsal opisthosoma and femora.

== Behavior ==
Cebrennus rechenbergi flic-flacing

The Moroccan flic-flac spider is nocturnal and is known to feed on moths before sunrise. It spends the hot desert days in its cool burrow in the sand protected from the sun and predators. The spider creates its dwelling with its pedipalps (feelers) and bristles, forming long, vertical tubes out of sand and silk. Using a series of rapid, acrobatic flic-flac movements of its legs similar to those used by gymnasts, the spider is able to actively propel itself off the ground, allowing it to move both down and uphill, even at a 40 percent incline. This behavior is different than other huntsman spiders, such as Carparachne aureoflava from the Namib Desert, which uses passive cartwheeling as a form of locomotion. The flic-flac spider can reach speeds of up to 2 m/s (i.e., slow human walking speed) using forward or back flips to evade threats.

== Distribution ==
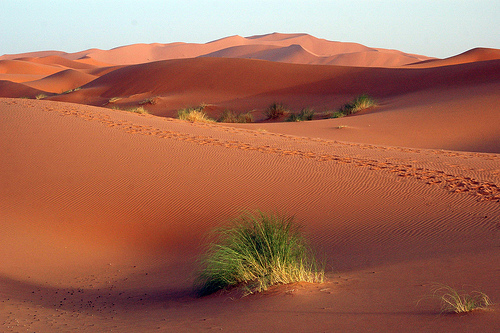
Erg Chebbi sand dune habitat

C. rechenbergi lives in the sand dunes of the Erg Chebbi desert located in Errachidia Province in southeastern Morocco near the border with Algeria. It is one of 17 species in the genus Cebrennus, typically found in Northern Africa and the Arabian Peninsula.

== Spider robot ==
Rechenberg's discovery of the flic-flac spider inspired the development of a biomimetic robot based on the rolling spider locomotion. The design process initially involved at least four generations, with the fourth using six legs in three pairs. (Note: When King 2013 published his work on Rechenberg's robot design, Cebrennus rechenbergi had not yet been differentiated from Cebrennus villosus as a new species. King makes a note of this, writing that any future taxonomic changes were beyond the scope of the book.) Rechenberg named the working machine model Tabbot, based on the Berber word "tabacha", meaning spider. The model, which is approximately 25 cm in length, can both walk in the sand and turn somersaults to move. Rechenberg envisions possible uses for the robot "in agriculture, on the ocean floor, or even on Mars".
