= Rectilinear locomotion =

Mode of locomotion associated with snakes

Rectilinear motion in a puff adder

Rectilinear locomotion or rectilinear progression is a mode of locomotion most often associated with snakes. In particular, it is associated with heavy-bodied species such as terrestrial African adders, pythons and boas; however, most snakes are capable of it. It is one of at least five forms of locomotion used by snakes, the others being lateral undulation, sidewinding, concertina movement, and slide-pushing. Unlike all other modes of snake locomotion, which include the snake bending its body, the snake flexes its body only when turning in rectilinear locomotion.

== Biomechanics of rectilinear locomotion ==
Rectilinear locomotion relies upon two opposing muscles, the costocutaneous inferior and superior, which are present on every rib and connect the ribs to the skin. Although it was originally believed that the ribs moved in a "walking" pattern during rectilinear movement, studies have shown that the ribs themselves do not move; only the muscles and the skin move to produce forward motion. First, the costocutaneous superior lifts a section of the snake's belly from the ground and places it ahead of its former position. Then the costocutaneous inferior pulls backward while the belly scales are on the ground, propelling the snake forwards. These sections of contact propagate posteriorly, which results in the ventral surface, or belly, moving in discrete sections akin to "steps" while the overall body of the snake moves continuously forward at a relatively constant speed.

== Uses of rectilinear locomotion ==
This method of locomotion is extremely slow (between 0.01–0.06 m/s (0.033–0.197 ft/s)), but is almost silent and very hard to detect, making it the mode of choice for many species when stalking prey. It is primarily used when the space being traversed is too constricting to allow for other forms of movement. When climbing, snakes will often use rectilinear locomotion in conjunction with concertina movements to exploit terrain features such as interstices in the surfaces they are climbing.

Rectilinear locomotion may also be useful after snakes eat. Snakes have more difficulty bending their spines after consuming large prey, and rectilinear movement requires less flexing of the spine than other locomotion types.

== In robotics ==
The development of rectilinear movement in robotics is centered around the development of snakelike robots, which have significant advantages over robots with wheeled or bipedal locomotion. The primary advantage in the creation of a serpentine robot is that the robot is often capable of traversing rough, muddy, and complex terrain that is often prohibitive to wheeled robots. Secondly, due to the mechanisms responsible for rectilinear and other forms of serpentine locomotion, the robots tend to have repetitive motor elements, which makes the entire robot relatively robust to mechanical failure.

== See also ==
- Longitudinal wave
