= Architectural gear ratio =

Ratio between muscle-shortening velocity and fiber-shortening velocity

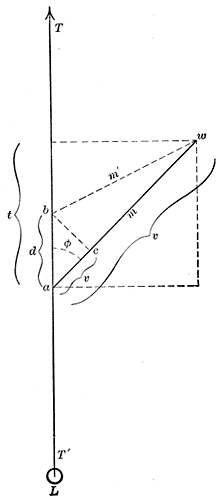
Figure 1 Anatomical gear ratio. The line aw represents a muscle fiber of length m with its origin at w and insertion into an aponeurosis (TT') at a. The fiber shortens to length m' and moves its insertion the distance d to point b. Note that the shortening muscle fiber does not pull the aponeurosis along the line of action of the fiber but rather rotates around its origin. This is because the 3-dimensional structure of the muscle resists inward movement of the aponeurosis so that the distance between the fiber origin and the aponeurosis remains constant. For a very small shortening of the muscle, the distance ac represents the shortening of the muscle and is equal to ab*cosΦ where Φ is the instantaneous pennation angle. For a pennate muscle, cosΦ is always less than 1, meaning that the distance ac is always shorter than the distance ab, thus the muscle fiber shortening is 'amplified' by a factor of 1/cosΦ.

Architectural gear ratio, also called anatomical gear ratio (AGR) is a feature of pennate muscle defined by the ratio between the longitudinal strain of the muscle and muscle fiber strain. It is sometimes also defined as the ratio between muscle-shortening velocity and fiber-shortening velocity.

AGR = ε_{x}/ε_{f}

where ε_{x} = longitudinal strain (or muscle-shortening velocity) and ε_{f} is fiber strain (or fiber-shortening velocity) In fusiform muscle, the fibers are longitudinal, so longitudinal strain is equal to fiber strain, and AGR is always 1.

As the pennate muscle is activated, the fibers rotate as they shorten and pull at an angle. In pennate muscles, fibers are oriented at an angle to the muscle's line of action and rotate as they shorten, becoming more oblique such that the fraction of force directed along the muscle's line of action decreases throughout a contraction. Force output is dependent upon the angle of fiber rotation, so changes in muscle thickness and the vector of change in thickness vary; based upon the force being produced. Due to the rotational motion; pennate muscles operate at low velocities (low shortening distance). The shortening velocity of the pennate muscle as a whole is greater than that of the individual fibers. This gives rise to the property of AGR. Fiber rotation decreases a muscle's output force but increases output velocity by allowing the muscle to function at a higher gear ratio (muscle velocity/fiber velocity). Azizi and Brainerd demonstrated that the gear ratio of pennate muscle can vary; dependent on external load.

Segmented musculature, like pennate muscle, has fibers aligned at an angle and due to this feature of design, when muscle fibers increase in angle with respect to the medial axis, along with the direction and amount of muscle bulging, the Architectural gear ratio increases. A variable gear ratio, based upon different anatomical position, loading and movement conditions, has since been dubbed spatially varying gear ratio. The occurrence of spatially varying gear ratio gives rise to a new insight of muscle biology; “inhomogenous muscle mechanics.”

One feature of the ratio is that there is an optimal gear ratio for each muscle; as the length-tension and force-velocity relationships describe. Length-tension refers to the max tension that can be created over the muscle fiber strain range and force-velocity refers to the power that is possible of the fiber compared to the shortening velocity. These two features of musculature help to define an optimal AGR for a muscle.

== Muscle model ==
The Architectural gear ratio is explained through the segmented muscle model 3 proposed by Emanuel Azizi, where a muscle segment is shown as a single muscle fiber attached to the myosepta of a Siren lacertina an aquatic salamander at a certain acute, pennation angle. The model allows segments to bulge out differently in the horizontal, and vertical direction and was used to calculate the Architectural gear ratio of each segment. Preliminary models results show that with muscle bulging, the Architectural gear ratio will increase. Different bulging conditions were studied, and shown in Fig. 2 The model results show the more a muscle bulges in dorsoventral height, the further the muscle fibers shorten, therefore providing a higher Architectural gear ratio.

In pennate muscles, segments with higher pennation angles put out less force per shortening muscle fiber. Therefore, the architectural gear ratio of a pennate muscle is higher than the architectural gear ratio of spindle like muscles (e.g. fusiform). A smaller fiber length neutralizes this higher architectural gear ratio if the muscle fibers must be squeezed into the same space.

== Pennation angle and muscle injury ==
The rotator cuff comprises four pennate muscles, the supraspinatus, infraspinatus, subscapularis and teres minor, and their accompanying tendons. These muscles form a cuff around the glenohumeral joint and function to stabilize and manipulate the shoulder.

The pennation angle of the rotator cuff myofibers, the angle at which fibers connect to the associated tendon, affects the contractile properties and function of the whole pennate muscle. For example, the pennation angle determines the architectural gear ratio at which a pennate muscle operates. A large initial pennation angle results in a large AGR and velocity amplification.

A 2011 study on human cadaveric shoulders suggests tendon tears may affect the pennation angle of the rotator cuff muscles. Researchers compared pennation angle between a control group and tear groups comprising either partial or complete-thickness tendon tears. Via dissection of ten injured and ten non-injured cadeveric shoulders, the study discovered a correlation between tendon tear size and an increase in pennation angle among two of the rotator cuff muscles. Pennation angle remained unaffected across all rotator cuff muscles in the partial tendon tear group, suggesting a threshold tear size must be exceeded to produce any changes in pennation angle. Full-thickness tendon tears did not affect the pennation angle of the subscapularis or teres minor muscles. However, a correlation between full-thickness rotator cuff tear size and the pennation angle of the supraspnatus and infraspinatus muscles was evident. The length of the full-thickness tendon tear strongly correlated with an increase in the pennation angle of the supraspinatus muscle. In addition, a moderately strong association between the area of the full-thickness tear and the resulting increase in pennation angle of the infraspinatus was visible.

The increase in pennation angle may lead to changes in muscle structure. In a study utilizing sheep subjects, a chronic rotator cuff tear resulted in an increase in both the pennation angle and separation between myofibers of the rotator cuff muscles. Fat cells then populated the rearranged muscle. This phenomenon was also evident in the aforementioned human experiment.

The increase in pennation angle following full-thickness tendon tears will result in a change to the PCSA of the supraspinatus and infraspinutus muscles. This would reduce the force producing capacity of these muscles. However, partial tendon tears, which did not result in a change to pennation in any of the rotator cuff muscles, may not impair the force producing properties of the muscles. Azizi's observations on variable gearing in pennate muscles further suggests tendon tears will affect the AGR of the supraspinatus and infraspinutus. The greater pennation angle could result in an increased AGR.

Some scientists suggest patch grafts ought to be applied to irreparable rotator cuff tears. Though this practice lessens pain, muscle strength is not fully recovered. The abovementioned human rotator cuff study correlates pennation angle with tear length in the supraspinatus muscle. Therefore, a patch graft may not resolve the length change necessary to restore pennation angle; retraction of the torn tendon may lessen the post-tear pennation angle and restore muscle strength to a greater extent.

Intrafasciular strain showed that the muscle was nonuniform, and that the architectural gear ratio is the highest at the proximal region of the muscle but then decreases towards the distal region. “ It is currently not possible to determine the precise distribution of stress throughout a muscle, but it seems reasonable to assume that the total (integrated) force at any cross section of the muscle and tendon remains fairly constant along the proximodistal axis. The smaller cross-sectional areas as the muscle thins and becomes tendon will thus result in a higher stress concentration to accommodate the same stress over a smaller area and therefore potentially higher strains if material properties remained constant."

== Muscle architecture and resistance training ==
The muscle architecture of pennate muscles, such as the human quadriceps, is highly plastic and strongly influences contractile properties. Changes to pennate muscle architectural properties, such as pennation angle and thereby the PCSA, can alter the muscle's force-producing capabilities as well as the AGR at which the muscle operates. Parallelogram models predict that total PCSA of bipennate muscles increases in proportion to sin(θpennation) while total force exerted on the associated aponeurosis decreases with cos(θpennation). This theorizes that pennate muscle force generation increases until a 45 degree pennation angle is achieved.

A 2001 study, conducted by Aagaard et al., utilized MRI, ultrasonography and muscle biopsy techniques to examine the relationship between muscle architecture, contractile strength and pennation angle in the human quadriceps muscle after 14 weeks of resistance training. Upon completion of the training program, Aagaard et al. noticed a symmetrical increase in quadriceps CSA and volume, as each increased 10.2 and 10.3 percent respectively; however, these parameters increased disproportionately to quadriceps PCSA, which grew 16 percent. The rapid increase in PCSA was accompanied by a 35.5% increase in the fascicle pennation angle of the vastus lateris, one of the major quadriceps muscles, as well as a 16% increase in myofiber CSA. The increase in pennation angle in the vastus lateris resulted in an increase to the muscle's PCSA, a measure proportional to the contractile force a pennate muscle is capable of producing. Work by Azizi et al. suggests this increase in pennation angle of the vastus lateris following resistance training generates an increase in the muscle's AGR, a property which allows the whole muscle to contract with a higher velocity.

A 2007 study, conducted by Blazevich et al., reiterated and added an extra dimension to Aagaard et al.’s conclusions. Blazevich et al. examined the effect of 10-week concentric or eccentric knee extension training on architectural properties of the human quadriceps with the purpose of uncovering the mechanical stimulus involved in architecture adaptation. Both modes of exercise resulted in increased peak concentric and eccentric strength. Concentric training, however, results in higher peak concentric strength. Ultrasonography suggests vastus medialus and vastus lateris muscle fiber length increase similarly following eccentric and concentric training, with the changes occurring abruptly over the first 5 weeks of the training program. Because fiber length was independent of training type, Blazevich et al. believe distance of operation determines the optimal fiber length. This muscle property is important in determining the angle-torque relationship of a muscle. The study supported the pennation angle trends uncovered by Aagaard et al.; in addition, Blazevich et al. concluded that the vastus lateris fascicle angle changes are independent of training type and modulates strongly with volume. This suggests fiber length and pennation angle modifications occur via separate mechanical stimuli, i.e. distance of operation and muscle volume respectively. Furthermore, these angle changes occur over a relatively long time scale as the pennation angle increased until the cessation of the training program at week 10. Blazevich et al. predict the increase in pennation angle seen after eccentric or concentric training allow the pennate muscle to attach more fibers to the associated aponeurosis as well as increase PCSA and AGR. Architectural modifications to pennate muscles shift the position at which the muscle operates on the force-velocity and force-length curves to regions best suited for the muscle's function. An increase in pennation angle theoretically increases both the PCSA and AGR of a given pennate muscle, allowing the muscle to generate higher forces while operating at higher optimal speeds. An increase to fiber length would allow the muscle to function at longer lengths.

== Strain and AGR heterogeneity within a muscle ==
A 2009 study utilizing magnetic resonance imaging and ultrasonography discovered strain and pennation angle heterogeneity within the medial gastrocnemius pennate muscle during differing modes of contraction. Parameters of fascicle location and contraction type (eccentric or passive), determined the magnitude of strain experienced by differing regions of the MG. Fascicle ends nearest the deep MG aponeurosis (Achilles tendon) showed an increase in strain from the proximal to distal portions of the MG muscle. The converse was seen in the fascicle ends adjacent to the superficial aponeurosis, which decreased in fiber strain from proximal to distal portions of the MG muscle. These trends may have been due to changes in CSA of the muscle at the proximal and distal ends of the MG, resulting in regions of high stress and strain concentration. This regional variability in strain was accompanied by a statistically significant increase in AGR and resting pennation angle from distal to proximal portions of the muscle. Furthermore, greater changes in pennation angle were visible at the proximal end of the MG. The experimental AGR values modulated positively with the pennation angle as well as the distance between the deep and superficial apopneuroses and may have been affected by regional patterns in orthogonal bulging. These trends highlight the complexity of muscle physiology, as different regions of muscles may contract with diverse contractile properties, such as strain and AGR.
