= Concertina movement =

Method of locomotion used by snakes

Concertina movement is the method by which a snake or other organism anchors itself with sections of itself and pulls or pushes with other sections to move in the direction it wants to go. To spring forward a snake may require a rough surface to thrust back against. It is named after the concertina musical instrument.

== Mechanism ==
Each point on the snake's body goes through alternating cycles of static contact and movement, with regions propagating posteriorly (i.e. any point on the snake will change from movement to stasis or vice versa shortly after the change occurs in the point anterior to it). This movement is quite strenuous and slow compared to other methods of locomotion. Energetic studies show that it takes more calories per meter to use concertina locomotion than either sidewinding or lateral undulation.

== Modes ==
In snakes, there are two currently recognized modes of concertina locomotion.

=== Tunnel ===
Tunnel concertina locomotion is often employed in unobstructed tunnels, where the snake lacks both sufficient contact points to perform lateral undulation and sufficient lateral room to perform sidewinding. During tunnel concertina locomotion, the snake anchors itself by flexing its body in a series on alternating bends which press against the walls of the tunnel. The snake extends the anterior portion of its body by straightening these bends, then flexes the anterior portion of the body to form anterior anchor points while pulling the posterior portion forward. This mode of concertina, while still slower than lateral undulation or sidewinding, is still fairly fast, with snakes moving approximately 10% of their length per second. However, because the snake is straightening and re-forming bends, it requires the entire space of the tunnel to move, and any obstruction will disrupt locomotion. In the presence of either of these, snakes will switch from concertina to another mode (as both of the above are faster and more economical), though in the case of extreme lateral constraint (tunnel width less than 3x body width), snakes will ignore the contact points that could be used in lateral undulation and perform concertina.

=== Arboreal ===
Arboreal concertina locomotion is employed on bare branches on trees, when secondary branches are not available (when they are, snakes perform lateral undulation, using these branches as contact points). In this mode of concertina locomotion, snakes likely grip the branch by ventrally flexing the body at the points where the alternation bends cross the perch, with the bends themselves sometimes extending beyond the edge of the branch. The snake extends the anterior portion of its body, but as it does so, the body follows a constant path (like lateral undulation, but unlike tunnel concertina locomotion). It then forms anterior grips and pulls the body forward, again demonstrating the 'path following' characteristic. Unlike tunnel concertina locomotion, this mode avoids any obstacle which falls between the bends of the snake's body. However, it is exceptionally slow, with snakes rarely moving faster than 2% of their length per second.

Some snakes, such as the brown tree snake, use a "lasso-climbing" or "lasso locomotion" technique to climb vertically by wrapping around the vertical object, including poles intended to stop predators.
