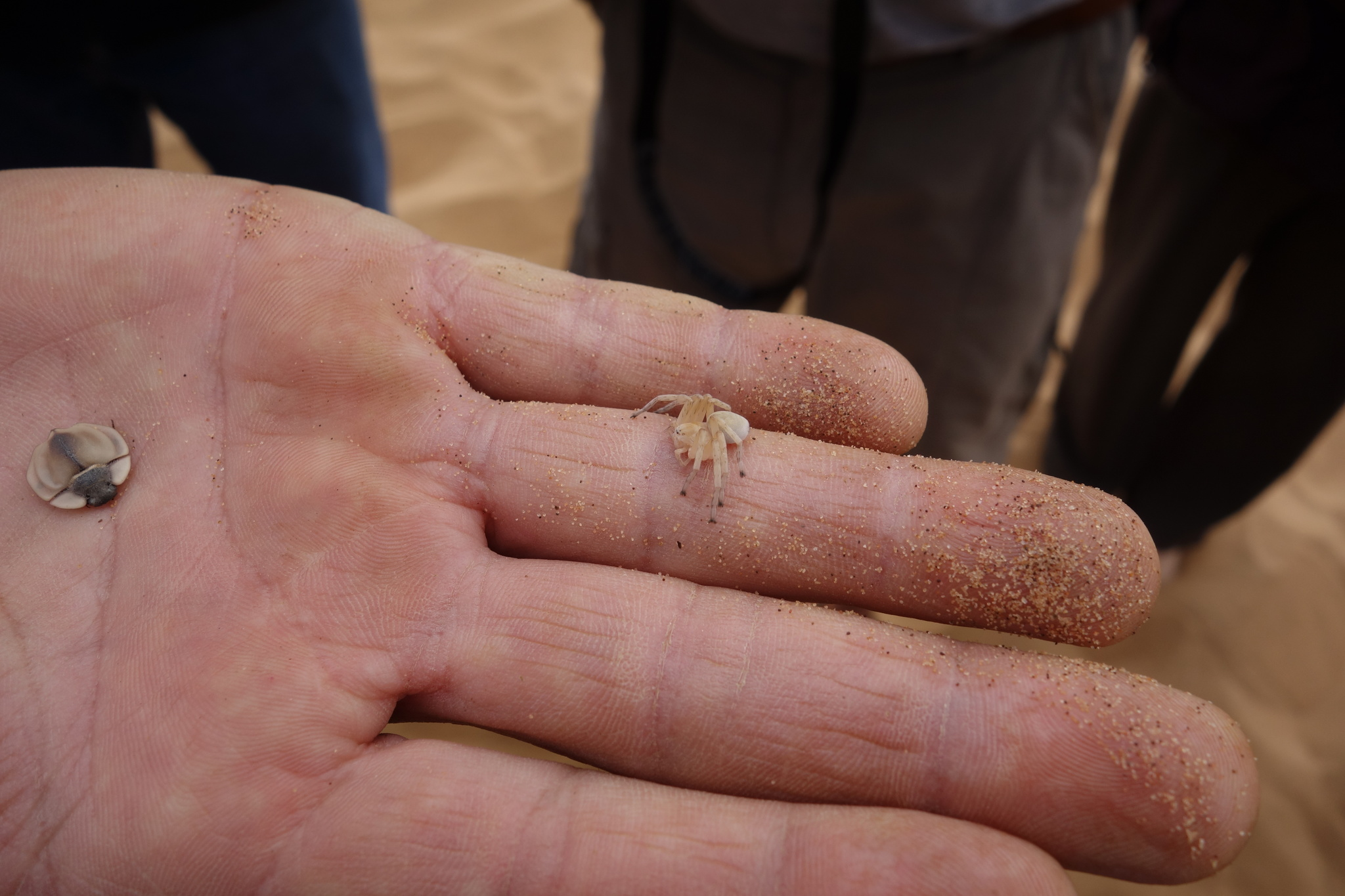

Scientific classification
- Kingdom: Animalia
- Phylum: Arthropoda
- Subphylum: Chelicerata
- Class: Arachnida
- Order: Araneae
- Infraorder: Araneomorphae
- Family: Sparassidae
- Genus: Carparachne
- Species: C. aureoflava

Binomial name
- Carparachne aureoflava Lawrence, 1966

Synonyms
- Carparachne aureo-flava

= Wheel spider =

Huntsman spider native to the Namib Desert

The wheel spider or golden wheel spider (Carparachne aureoflava) is a huntsman spider native to the Namib Desert of Southern Africa. This spider is distinct from Leucorchestris arenicola, a spider sharing the same common name and found in the same locale. The spider escapes parasitic pompilid wasps by flipping onto its side and cartwheeling down sand dunes at speeds of up to 44 turns per second.

== Characteristics ==
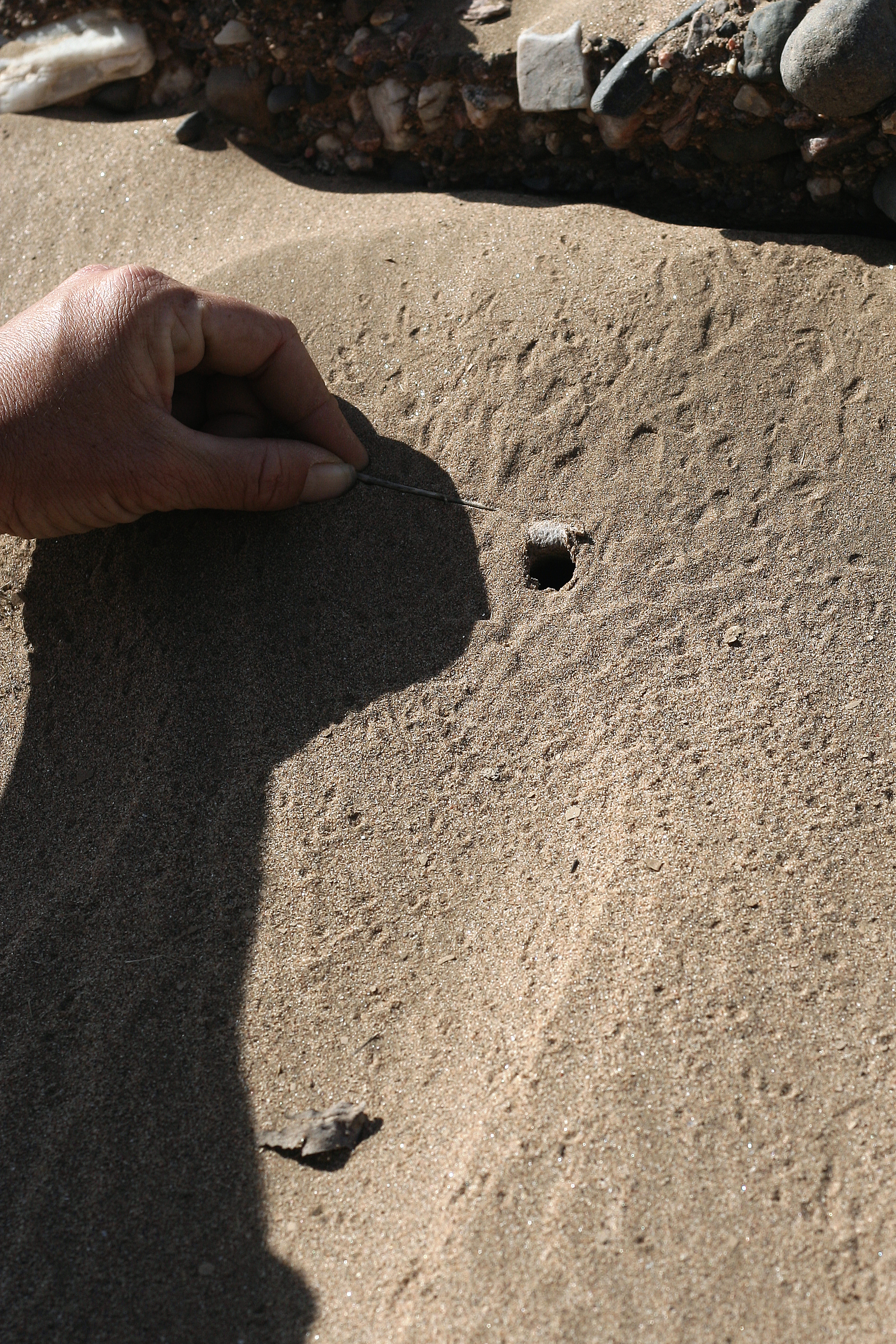
Burrow

Wheel spiders are up to 20 mm in size, with males and females the same size. The wheel spider does not make a web; it is a nocturnal, free-ranging hunter, coming out at night to prey on insects and other small invertebrates. Its bite is mildly venomous, but the spider is not known to be harmful to humans.

Its principal line of defence against predation is to bury itself in a silk-lined burrow extending 40–50 cm deep. During the process of digging its burrow, the spider can shift up to 10 litres (2.6 US gal) of sand, 80,000 times its body weight. During the initial stages of building a burrow, the spider is vulnerable to pompilid wasps, which digs through the sand to sting and paralyze the spider, then lay eggs upon the still-living spider's body. Wasps usually win the fights against spiders. If the spider is unable to fight off a wasp and if the fight is on a sloped dune, the spider will use its rolling speed of 1 metre per second (3.3 ft/s) to escape.
