= Sidewinding =

Particular kind of snake locomotion

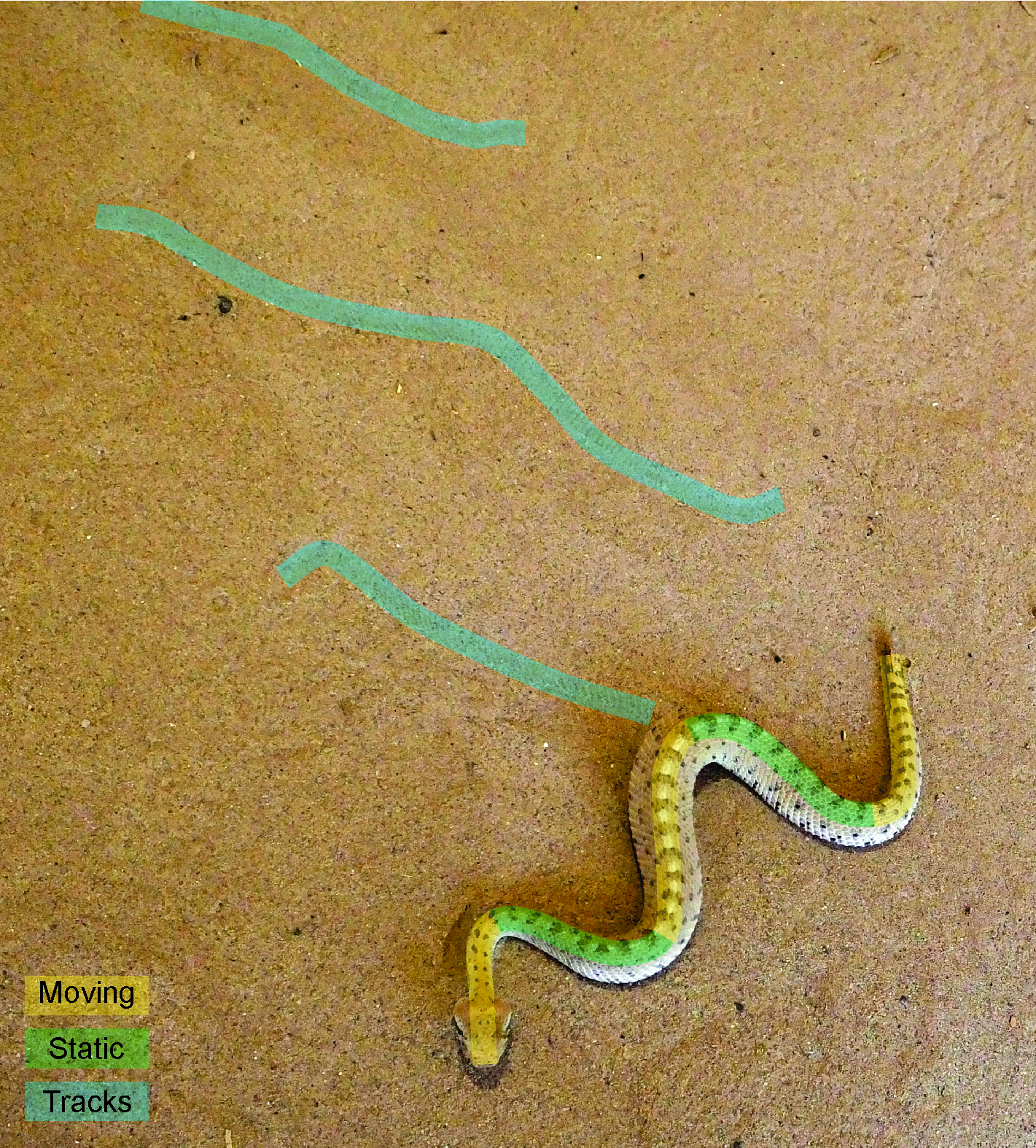
Sidewinding in a newborn sidewinder rattlesnake. Yellow regions are lifted above the sand and in motion at the time of the photo, while green regions are in static contact with the sand. Blue denotes tracks. Scale imprints are visible in the tracks, showing that the snake's body is static during ground contact.

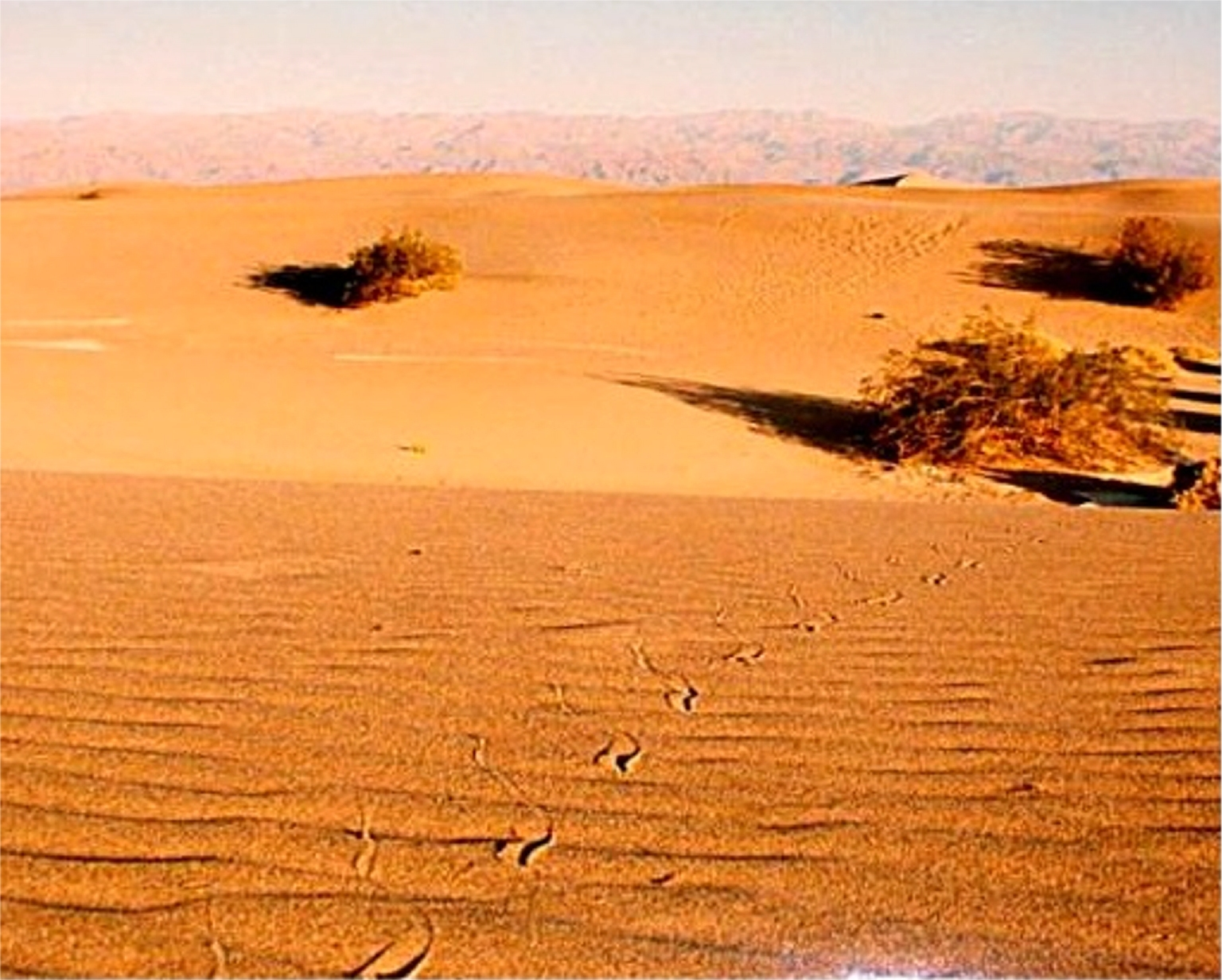
Tracks of a sidewinder in the sand

Sidewinding is a type of locomotion unique to snakes, used to move across loose or slippery substrates. It is most often used by the Saharan horned viper, Cerastes cerastes, the Mojave sidewinder rattlesnake, Crotalus cerastes, and the Namib desert sidewinding adder, Bitis peringueyi, to move across loose desert sands, and also by Homalopsine snakes in Southeast Asia to move across tidal mud flats. Any number of caenophidian snakes can be induced to sidewind on smooth surfaces, though the difficulty in getting them to do so and their proficiency at it vary greatly.

The method of movement is derived from lateral undulation, and is very similar, in spite of appearances. A picture of a snake performing lateral undulation would show something like a sine wave, with straight segments of the body having either a positive or negative slope. Sidewinding is accomplished by undulating vertically as well as laterally, with the head tracing out an ellipse in a vertical plane nearly perpendicular to the direction of movement and with all the segments that have a significantly non-zero slope (and alternating segments that have a zero slope) lifted off the ground.

The ventral scales of sidewinding snakes are short and have small, microscopic holes in them to reduce friction, as opposed to the more spike-shaped ones of other snakes. These are more prominent in the African horned viper and sand vipers than the American sidewinder, theorised to do with the formers' environments being older by millions of years.

In the resultant movement, the snake's body is always in static (as opposed to sliding) contact when touching the ground. The head seems to be "thrown" forward, and the body follows, being lifted from the prior position and moved forward to lie on the ground ahead of where it was originally. Meanwhile, the head is being thrown forward again. In this way, the snake slowly progresses at an angle, leaving a series of mostly straight, J-shaped tracks. Because the snake's body is in static contact with the ground, without slip, imprints of the belly scales can be seen in the tracks, and each track is almost exactly as long as the snake.

Sidewinder rattlesnakes can use sidewinding to ascend sandy slopes by increasing the portion of the body in contact with the sand to match the reduced yielding force of the inclined sand, allowing them to ascend up to the maximum possible sand slope without slip. Implementing this control scheme in a snakebot capable of sidewinding allowed the robot to replicate the success of the snakes.

A crude animated line-drawing showing the locomotor pattern of sidewinding. The light brown areas are the tracks left behind, and also indicate where the body of the snake touched the ground.

One can determine the line of movement of the snake by drawing a line connecting either the right or left tips of the tracks.
