= List of reptiles of Africa =

African reptiles are categorized by reptilian order:

Order Testudines: turtles

Image	Common name(s)	Scientific name	Distribution	Notes
	African spurred tortoise or Sulcata tortoise	Centrochelys sulcata	southern edge of the Sahara Desert	Third largest species of tortoise in the world; the largest non-island species.
	African helmeted turtle Marsh terrapin	Pelomedusa subrufa	Very wide range	
	Aldabra giant tortoise	Aldabrachelys gigantea	Seychelles	
	Angonoka tortoise	Astrochelys yniphora	native to Madagascar	
Aubry's flapshell turtle. (Photo credit to Tomas Diagne / African Chelonian Institute)	Aubry's flapshell turtle	Cycloderma aubryi	Democratic Republic of Congo, Zaire, Gabon, Angola and Central African Republic	
The head of cycloderma frenatum (Zambezi flapshell turtle). Photo credit to Tomas Diagne / African Chelonian Institute The United States and eight African nations have submitted a proposal to include six species of African and Middle Eastern softshell turtles in Appendix II of CITES.	Zambezi flapshell turtle	Cycloderma frenatum	Tanzania, Zambia, Zimbabwe, Malawi, Mozambique	
	East African black mud turtle	Pelusios subniger	East Africa, Madagascar, Seychelles	
	Geometric tortoise	Psammobates geometricus	Cape area of South Africa	
	Leopard tortoise	Stigmochelys pardalis	savannah from Sudan to South Africa	
Lobatse Hingeback Tortoise (Kinixys lobatsiana) in South Africa	Lobatse hinge-back tortoise	Kinixys lobatsiana	Southern Africa	
African Softshell Turtle at Nahal Alexander, near Netanya, Israel	African softshell turtle	Trionyx triunguis	parts of East, West and Middle Africa	
	Pancake tortoise	Malacochersus tornieri	most common in Kenya and Tanzania	
	Radiated tortoise	Astrochelys radiata	native to southern Madagascar	
	Speke's hinge-back tortoise	Kinixys spekii	Southeastern Africa (incl. Kenya, South Africa, Tanzania, Uganda)	
	Turkana mud turtle	Pelusios broadleyi	Eastern Africa (Kenya, etc.)	
	Upemba mud turtle	Pelusios upembae	Democratic Republic of the Congo	
	Yellowbelly mud turtle	Pelusios castanoides	Madagascar, Malawi, Mozambique, Seychelles, South Africa, and Tanzania	

Order Squamata: snakes and lizards

- Acanthocercus
- Acanthodactylus erythrurus
- Acanthodactylus mechriguensis
- Agama (genus)
- Agama agama
- Agama aculeata
- Agama africana
- Agama armata
- Agama caudospinosa
- Agama mwanzae
- Agama rueppelli
- Aspidelaps
- Atheris ceratophora
- Atheris chlorechis
- Atheris desaixi
- Atheris hispida
- Atheris katangensis
- Atheris nitschei
- Atheris squamigera
- Bitis arietans
- Bitis atropos
- Bitis caudalis
- Bitis cornuta
- Bitis gabonica
- Bitis heraldica
- Bitis inornata
- Bitis nasicornis
- Bitis parviocula
- Bitis peringueyi
- Bitis rubida
- Bitis schneideri
- Bitis worthingtoni
- Bitis xeropaga
- Boomslang
- Boulengerina annulata
- Cape Cobra
- Cape Dwarf Chameleon
- Chalcides armitagei
- Chalcides montanus
- Chalcides ocellatus
- Chalcides pulchellus
- Chalcides regazzii
- Chalcides thierryi
- Chamaeleo hoehnelii
- Chamaeleo johnstoni
- Chamaeleo melleri
- Charina
- Common Egg-eater
- Eastern green mamba
- Echis coloratus
- Fischer's Chameleon
- Hemidactylus brookii
- Hemidactylus echinus
- Hemidactylus frenatus
- Hemidactylus mabouia
- Hemidactylus muriceus
- Hemidactylus pseudomuriceus
- Henkel's Leaf-tailed Gecko
- Jackson's Chameleon
- Karoo Dwarf Chameleon
- Lined day gecko
- Madagascarophis
- Mamba
- Mozambique Spitting Cobra
- Naja ashei
- Naja nigricollis
- Namaqua Chameleon
- Nile monitor
- Nucras caesicaudata
- Paranaja multifasciata
- Phelsuma pusilla pusilla
- Psudohaje goldii
- Python anchietae
- Python regius
- Python sebae
- Python sebae natalensis
- Red Spitting Cobra
- Rhamphiophis oxyrhynchus
- Rhampholeon spectrum
- Rhampholeon brevicaudatus
- Rinkhals
- Rosette-Nosed Chameleon
- Savannah monitor
- Sharp-nosed Chameleon
- Small-spotted Lizard
- Spitting cobra
- Strange-nosed Chameleon
- Trachylepis striata
- Uromastyx geyri
- Uroplatus
- Uroplatus guentheri
- Uroplatus lineatus
- Uroplatus phantasticus
- Uroplatus fimbriatus
- Uroplatus silkorae
- Varanus albigularis
- Varanus albigularis angolensis
- Varanus albigularis microstictus
- Varanus albigularis ionidesi
- Varanus griseus
- Vipera monticola
- Western green mamba
- Yellow-throated day gecko

Order Crocodilia: crocodiles

- Nile Crocodile
- Crocodile
- Dwarf Crocodile
- Slender-snouted Crocodile
