= Antivenom =

Medical treatment for venomous bites and stings

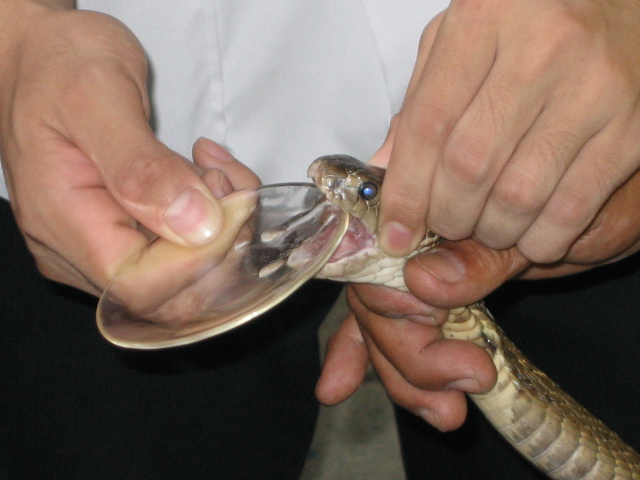
- Milking a snake for the production of antivenom

Clinical data
- Other names: antivenin, antivenene
- AHFS/Drugs.com: Monograph
- Routes of administration: injection
- ATC code: J06

Identifiers
- ChemSpider: none

Antivenom, also known as antivenin, venom antiserum, and antivenom immunoglobulin, is a specific treatment for envenomation. It is composed of antibodies and used to treat certain venomous bites and stings. Antivenoms are recommended only if there is significant toxicity or a high risk of toxicity. The specific antivenom needed depends on the species involved. It is given by injection.

Side effects may be severe. They include serum sickness, shortness of breath, and allergic reactions including anaphylaxis. Antivenom is traditionally made by collecting venom from the relevant animal and injecting small amounts of it into a domestic animal. The antibodies that form are then collected from the domestic animal's blood and purified.

Versions are available for spider bites, snake bites, fish stings, and scorpion stings. Due to the high cost of producing antibody-based antivenoms and their short shelf lives when not refrigerated, alternative methods of production of antivenoms are being actively explored. One such different method of production involves production from bacteria. Another approach is to develop targeted drugs (which, unlike antibodies, are usually synthetic and easier to manufacture at scale).

Antivenom was first developed in the late 19th century and came into common use in the 1950s. It is on the World Health Organization's List of Essential Medicines.

== Medical uses ==
Antivenom is used to treat certain venomous bites and stings. They are recommended only if there is significant toxicity or a high risk of toxicity. The specific antivenom needed depends on the venomous species involved.

In the US, approved antivenom, including for pit viper (rattlesnake, copperhead and water moccasin) snakebite, is based on a purified product made in sheep known as CroFab. It was approved by the FDA in October 2000. U.S. coral snake antivenom ceased production, and remaining stocks of in-date antivenom for coral snakebite expired in fall 2009, leaving the U.S. without a coral snake antivenom. However, as of July 2021, Pfizer has indicated that antivenom is available. Efforts are being made to obtain approval for a coral snake antivenom produced in Mexico which would work against U.S. coral snakebite, but such approval remains speculative.

As an alternative when conventional antivenom is not available, hospitals sometimes use an intravenous version of the antiparalytic drug neostigmine to delay the effects of neurotoxic envenomation through snakebite. Some promising research results have also been reported for administering the drug nasally as a "universal antivenom" for neurotoxic snakebite treatment.

A monovalent antivenom is specific for one toxin or species, while a polyvalent one is effective against multiple toxins or species.

The majority of antivenoms (including all snake antivenoms) are administered intravenously; however, stonefish and redback spider antivenoms are given intramuscularly. The intramuscular route has been questioned in some situations as not uniformly effective.

== Side effects ==
Antivenoms are purified from animal serum by several processes and may contain other serum proteins that can act as immunogens. Some individuals may react to the antivenom with an immediate hypersensitivity reaction (anaphylaxis) or a delayed hypersensitivity (serum sickness) reaction, and antivenom should, therefore, be used with caution. Although rare, severe hypersensitivity reactions including anaphylaxis to antivenom are possible. Despite this caution, antivenom is typically the sole effective treatment for a life-threatening condition, and once the precautions for managing these reactions are in place, an anaphylactoid reaction is not grounds to refuse to give antivenom if otherwise indicated. Although it is a popular myth that a person allergic to horses "cannot" be given antivenom, the side effects are manageable, and antivenom should be given rapidly as the side effects can be managed.

== Method of preparation ==
Most antivenoms are prepared by freeze drying (also called cryodesiccation or lyophilization). The process involves freezing the antisera, followed by application of high vacuum. This causes frozen water to sublimate. Sera is reduced to powder with no water content. In such an environment, microorganisms and enzymes cannot degrade the antivenom, and it can be stored for up to 5 years [at normal temperatures]. Liquid antivenoms may also be stored for 5 years, but they must be stored at low temperatures (below 8 °C/46 °F).

== Mechanism ==
Antivenoms act by binding to and neutralizing venoms. The principle of antivenom is based on that of vaccines, developed by Edward Jenner; however, instead of inducing immunity in the person directly, it is induced in a host animal and the hyperimmunized serum is transfused into the person. The host animals may include horses, donkeys, goats, sheep, rabbits, chickens, llamas, and camels. In addition, opossums are being studied for antivenom production, as unique opossum blood proteins such as lethal toxin neutralizing factor can neutralize snake venoms. Antivenoms for medical use are often preserved as freeze-dried ampoules, but some are available only in liquid form and must be kept refrigerated. They are not immediately inactivated by heat, however, so a minor gap in the cold chain is not disastrous.

== History ==
The natural immunity of snakes to their own venom was observed at least as early as 1767, by Felice Fontana in his work Ricerche Fisiche sopra il Veleno della Vipera (Physical Research on the Venom of the Viper). Scottish surgeon and naturalist Patrick Russell also noted in the late 18th century that snakes were not affected by their own venom. Surgeon-Major Edward Nicholson wrote in the November 1870 Madras Medical Journal that he had witnessed a Burmese snake-catcher inoculating himself with cobra venom. However, the snake-catcher was unsure whether this was actually effective and therefore continued to treat his snakes with care.

The notion of inducing immunity to venom was tested in laboratories around the world. In 1887, Dr. Henry Sewall in Michigan achieved artificial immunity to rattlesnake (Sistrurus catenatus catenatus) venom in pigeons by repeated inoculation of venom, starting with a sub-lethal dose and progressively increasing in strength until resistance developed to doses seven times the lethal dose in untreated pigeons. From 1889 to 1892, Maurice Kaufmann at the École nationale vétérinaire d'Alfort studied the effect of successive inoculations of weak doses of Vipera aspis venom on animals. Although proving that a greater resistance to low doses was possible, Kauffman was unable to achieve complete immunity against the venom at the lethal dose.

The breakthrough came with the use of serum from an immunized animal to counter the effects in an unexposed animal. This use a treatment for disease was pioneered in 1890 by Emil von Behring and Shibasaburo Kitasato, who first demonstrated that the endotoxin from the infectious diseases diphtheria and tetanus could be used to prevent or cure non-immunized animals using serum transfusions from an immune animal to a susceptible one.

Building on in this logic, and at the same session of the Society of Biology in Paris on February 10, 1894, Albert Calmette at the Pasteur Institute and independently Césaire Phisalix and Gabriel Bertrand at the Department of Pathology and Chemistry in the National Museum of National History in France, announced that they had achieved treatment of a vulnerable animal with serum from an immunized one both using snake venom. Calmette went on subsequently to immunize horses using venom from Indian cobras, and the resulting Serum Antivenimeux (antivenomous serum) became the first commercially available antivenom product. In 1895 Sir Thomas Fraser, Professor of Medicine at the University of Edinburgh, also produced a serum to act against cobra venom. His "antivenene" was effective in the laboratory.

In 1901, Vital Brazil, working at the Instituto Butantan in São Paulo, Brazil, developed the first monovalent and polyvalent antivenoms for Central and South American Crotalus and Bothrops snakes, as well as for certain species of venomous spiders, scorpions, and frogs. In Mexico in 1905, Daniel Vergara Lope developed an antivenom against scorpion venom, by immunizing dogs. In Australia, the Commonwealth Serum Laboratories (CSL) began antivenom research in the 1920s. CSL has developed antivenoms for the redback spider, funnel-web spiders and all deadly Australian snakes. In the USA, the H.K. Mulford company began producing "Nearctic Crotalidae antivenin" in 1927, via a consortium called the Antivenin Institute of America.

Over time, a variety of improvements have been made in the specificity, potency, and purity of antivenom products, including "salting out" with ammonium sulphate or caprylic acid, enzymatic reduction of antibodies with papain or with pepsin, affinity purification, and a variety of other measures. Many equine facilities now use plasmapheresis to collect blood plasma instead of blood serum.

== Availability ==
There is an overall shortage of antivenom to treat snakebites. Because of this shortage, clinical researchers are considering whether lower doses may be as effective as higher doses in severe neurotoxic snake envenoming.

Antivenom undergoes successive price markups after manufacturing, by licencees, wholesalers and hospitals. When weighed against profitability (especially for sale in poorer regions), the result is that many snake antivenoms, world-wide, are very expensive. Availability, from region to region, also varies.

Internationally, antivenoms must conform to the standards of pharmacopoeia and the World Health Organization (WHO).

Antivenoms have been developed for the venoms associated with the following animals:

=== Spiders ===
Antivenom	Species	Country
Funnel web spider antivenom	Sydney funnel-web spider	Australia
Soro antiaracnidico	Brazilian wandering spider	Brazil
Soro antiloxoscelico	Recluse spider	Brazil
Suero antiloxoscelico	Chilean recluse	Chile
Aracmyn	All species of Loxosceles and Latrodectus	Mexico
Redback spider antivenom	Redback spider	Australia
Black widow spider (Latrodectus Mactans) antivenin (equine origin)	Southern black widow spider	United States
SAIMR spider antivenom	Button spider	South Africa
Anti-Latrodectus antivenom	Black widow spider	Argentina

=== Acarids ===
Antivenom	Species	Country
Tick antivenom	Paralysis tick	Australia

=== Insects ===
Antivenom	Species	Country
soro antilonomico	Lonomia obliqua caterpillar	Brazil

=== Scorpions ===
Antivenom	Species	Country
Scorpion Venom Anti Serum (India) Purified lyophilized enzyme refined Equine Immunoglobulins	Buthus tamulus	India
ANTISCORP - Premium (Scorpion Venom Antiserum North Africa) Purified lyophilized enzyme refined Equine Immunoglobulins	Androctonus amoerexi and Leiurus quinquestraiatus	India
INOSCORPI MENA (Middle East and North Africa)	Androctonus australis, Androctonus mauritanicus, Androctonus crassicauda, Buthus occitanus mardochei, Buthus occitanus occitanus, Leiurus quinquestriatus quinquestriatus, Leiurus quinquestriatus hebreus	Spain
Alacramyn	Centruroides limpidus, C. noxius, C. suffusus	Mexico
Suero Antialacran	Centruroides limpidus, C. noxius, C. suffusus	Mexico
Tunisian polyvalent antivenom	All Iranian scorpions	Tunisia
Anti-Scorpion Venom Serum I.P. (AScVS)	Indian red scorpion	India
Anti-scorpionique	Androctonus spp., Buthus spp.	Algeria
Scorpion antivenom	Black scorpion, Buthus occitanus	Morocco
Soro antiscorpionico	Tityus spp.	Brazil
SAIMR scorpion antivenin	Parabuthus spp.	South Africa
Purified prevalent Anti-Scorpion Serum (equine source)	Leiurus spp. and Androctonus scorpions	Egypt

=== Marine animals ===
Antivenom	Species	Country
CSL box jellyfish antivenom	Box jellyfish	Australia
CSL stonefish antivenom	Stonefish	Australia

=== Snakes ===
Antivenom	Species	Country
PANAF PREMIUM (Sub-Sahara Africa) Purified lyophilized enzyme refined Equine Immunoglobulins	Echis ocellatus, Echis leucogaster, Echis carinatus, Bitis arietans, Bitis rhinoceros, Bitis nasicornis, Bitis gabonica, Dendroaspis polylepis, Dendroaspis viridis, Dendroaspis angusticeps, Dendroaspis jamesoni, Naja nigricollis, Naja melanoleuca and Naja haje	India
Snake Venom Antiserum (India) Purified lyophilized enzyme refined Equine Immunoglobulins	Naja naja, Vipera russelii and Echis carinatus	India
INOSERP MENA (Middle East and North Africa)	Bitis arietans, Cerastes cerastes, Cerastes gasperettii,Cerastes vipera, Daboia deserti, Daboia mauritanica, Daboia palaestinae, Echis carinatus sochureki, Echis coloratus, Echis khosatzkii, Echis leucogaster, Echis megalocephalus, Echis omanensis, Echis pyramidum, Macrovipera lebetina obtusa, Macrovipera lebetina transmediterranea, Macrovipera lebetina turanica, Montivipera bornmuelleri, Montivipera raddei kurdistanica, Pseuocerastes fieldi, Pseudocerastes persicus, Vipera latastei, Naja haje, Naja nubiae, Naja pallida and Walterinnesia aegyptia	Spain
INOSERP PAN-AFRICA (Sub-Sahara Africa)	Echis ocellatus, Bitis arietans, Dendroaspis polylepis and Naja nigricollis	Spain
EchiTAbG (Sub-Sahara Africa)	Echis ocellatus, Echis pyramidum	Wales
Polyvalent snake antivenom Anavip	South American rattlesnake Crotalus durissus and fer-de-lance Bothrops asper	Mexico (Instituto Bioclon); South America
Polyvalent snake antivenom	Saw-scaled viper Echis carinatus, Russell's viper Daboia russelli, spectacled cobra Naja naja, common krait Bungarus caeruleus (These are the "Big Four" snakes which account for nearly 75% of snakebites in India).	India
Death adder antivenom	Death adder	Australia
Taipan antivenom	Taipan	Australia
Black snake antivenom	Pseudechis spp.	Australia
Tiger snake antivenom	Australian copperheads, tiger snakes, Pseudechis spp., rough-scaled snake	Australia
Brown snake antivenom	Brown snakes	Australia
Polyvalent snake antivenom	Australian snakes as listed above	Australia
Sea snake antivenom	Sea snakes	Australia
Vipera tab	Vipera spp.	UK
Polyvalent crotalid antivenin (CroFab—Crotalidae Polyvalent Immune Fab (Ovine))	North American pit vipers (all rattlesnakes, copperheads, and cottonmouths)	North America
Soro antibotropicocrotalico	Pit vipers and rattlesnakes	Brazil
Antielapidico	Coral snakes	Brazil
SAIMR polyvalent antivenom	Mambas, cobras, Rinkhalses, puff adders (Unsuitable small adders: B. worthingtoni, B. atropos, B. caudalis, B. cornuta, B. heraldica, B. inornata, B. peringueyi, B. schneideri, B. xeropaga)	South Africa
SAIMR echis antivenom	Saw-scaled vipers	South Africa
SAIMR Boomslang antivenom	Boomslang	South Africa
Panamerican serum	Coral snakes	Costa Rica
Anticoral	Coral snakes	Costa Rica
Anti-mipartitus antivenom	Coral snakes	Costa Rica
Anticoral monovalent	Coral snakes	Costa Rica
Antimicrurus	Coral snakes	Argentina
Coralmyn	Coral snakes	Mexico
Anti-micruricoscorales	Coral snakes	Colombia
crotalidae immune F(ab')2 (equine)) (Anavip)	North American species of Crotalinae	US

== Terminology ==
The name "antivenin" comes from the French word venin, meaning venom, which in turn was derived from Latin venenum, meaning poison.

Historically, the term antivenin was predominant around the world, its first published use being in 1895. In 1981, the World Health Organization decided that the preferred terminology in the English language would be venom and antivenom rather than venin and antivenin or venen and antivenene.

== Research ==
A synthetic antibody has been shown to neutralize a major class of neurotoxins produced by four deadly snake species from South Asia, Southeast Asia, and Africa. The antibody targets long-chain α-neurotoxins, a common and lethal component of many elapid venoms, and may represent a step toward a universal antivenom effective against a broad spectrum of snake species.

Separately, a combination of broadly neutralizing human antibodies and the phospholipase inhibitor varespladib has been shown to protect mice from venom-induced lethality caused by multiple snake species. The antibodies were derived from a hyperimmune human donor who had developed broad resistance to snake venom through repeated exposures, resulting in a unique immune profile capable of neutralizing diverse venom toxins.
