= Snake antivenom =

Medication used to treat bites by venomous snakes

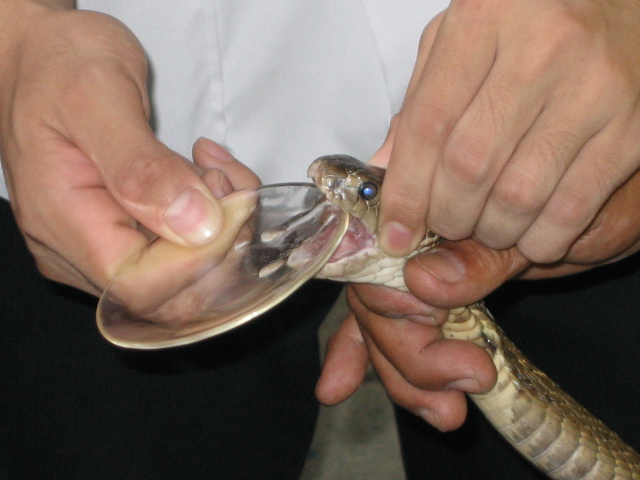

Clinical data
- Other names: Snake antivenin, snake antivenene, snake venom antiserum, antivenom immunoglobulin
- ATC code: J06AA03 (WHO)

Identifiers
- ChemSpider: none

Snake antivenom is a medication made up of antibodies used to treat snake bites by venomous snakes. It is a type of antivenom.

It is a biological product that typically consists of venom neutralizing antibodies derived from a host animal, such as a horse or sheep. The host animal is hyperimmunized to one or more snake venoms, a process which creates an immunological response that produces large numbers of neutralizing antibodies against various components (toxins) of the venom. The antibodies are then collected from the host animal, and further processed into snake antivenom for the treatment of envenomation.

It is on the World Health Organization's List of Essential Medicines.

== Production ==
Antivenoms are typically produced using a donor animal, such as a horse or sheep, due to ethical and practical concerns with real humans. The donor animal is hyperimmunized with non-lethal doses of one or more venoms to produce a neutralizing antibody response. Then, at certain intervals, the blood (or blood serum) from the donor animal is collected and neutralizing antibodies are purified from the blood to produce an antivenom.

== Classification ==
=== Monovalent vs. polyvalent ===
Snake antivenom can be classified by which antigens (venoms) were used in the production process. If the hyperimmunizing venom is obtained from a single species, then it is considered a monovalent antivenom. If the antivenom contains neutralizing antibodies raised against two or more species of snakes, then the composition is considered polyvalent.

=== Antibody composition ===
An antibody digested by papain yields three fragments, two Fab fragments and one Fc fragment

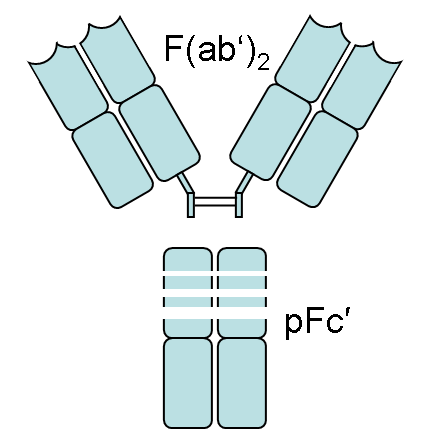
An antibody digested by pepsin yields two fragments: a F(ab')_{2} fragment and a pFc' fragment

Antivenom production starts with the antibody molecules from animal blood, usually immunoglobulin G (IgG). The IgG molecule can be broken down into two Fab regions, responsible for selectively binding the antigen such as venoms, and one Fc region, which is "constant" (unvarying) within a species and engages the immune system. The Fab region is the main neutralizing component in antivenom.

Whole antibody products use the entire IgG molecule. When IgG is digested using papain, the result is two Fab fragments and one Fc fragment. The Fab part is isolated using affinity chromatography to produce the product. When IgG is digested using pepsin, the result is a F(ab')_{2} fragment (two Fabs connected by a "hinge") and a pFc' fragment. The former is used to produce the product.

The molecular size of Fab is approximately 50kDa, making it smaller than F(ab')_{2} which is approximately 110kDa. These size differences greatly affect the tissue distribution and rates of elimination: Fab is able to penetrate more deeply into tissue, while F(ab')_{2} stays in blood for longer and confers a lower risk of late hemotoxicity (which happens when the antivenom leaves the body before the venom does).

=== Cross neutralization properties ===
Antivenoms may also have some cross protection against a variety of venoms from snakes within the same family or genera. For instance, Antivipmyn (Instituto Bioclon) is made using the venoms of Crotalus durissus and Bothrops asper. Antivipmyn has been shown to cross neutralize the venoms from all North American pit vipers. Cross neutralization affords antivenom manufacturers the ability to hyperimmunize with fewer venom types to produce geographically suitable antivenoms.

== Side effects ==
The main concern with antivenom use are acute hypersensitivity reactions (AHRs). AHRs are most frequent with whole antibodies and have been greatly reduced with the advent of fragment antibodies. In regions without endemic alpha-gal syndrome, the rates of AHR between Fab and F(ab')_{2} are similar. However, in regions where alpha-gal syndrome is common, F(ab')_{2} results in much higher rates of AHR. F(ab')_{2} is not subject to affinity chromatography and contains more blood-protein impurities. It also contains more alpha-gal. It is unclear whether these cases of AHR are due to either difference.

== Availability ==
Snake antivenom is complicated for manufacturers to produce. When weighed against profitability (especially for sale in poorer regions), the result is that many snake antivenoms, world-wide, are very expensive. Availability, from region to region, also varies.

=== Antivenom shortage for new world coral snake ===
As of 2012, the relative rarity of coral snake bites, combined with the high costs of producing and maintaining an antivenom supply, means that antivenom (also called "antivenin") production in the United States has ceased. According to Pfizer, the owner of the company that used to make the antivenom Coralmyn, it would take $5–$10 million for researching a new synthetic antivenom. The cost was too high in comparison to the small number of cases presented each year. The existing American coral snake antivenom stock technically expired in 2008, but the U.S. Food and Drug Administration has extended the expiration date every year through to at least 30 April 2017.

Foreign pharmaceutical manufacturers have produced other coral snake antivenoms, but the costs of licensing them in the United States have stalled availability. Instituto Bioclon is developing a coral snake antivenom. In 2013, Pfizer was reportedly working on a new batch of antivenom but had not announced when it would become available. As of 2016, the Venom Immunochemistry, Pharmacology and Emergency Response (VIPER) institute of the University of Arizona College of Medicine was enrolling participants in a clinical trial of INA2013, a "novel antivenom," according to the Florida Poison Information Center.

== Families of venomous snakes ==
Over 600 species are known to be venomous—about a quarter of all snake species. The following table lists some major species.

Family	Description
Atractaspididae (atractaspidids)	Burrowing asps, mole vipers, stiletto snakes.
Colubridae (colubrids)	Most are harmless, but others have toxic saliva and at least five species, including the boomslang (Dispholidus typus), have caused human fatalities.
Elapidae (elapids)	Sea snakes, taipans, brown snakes, coral snakes, kraits, king cobra, mambas, cobras.
Viperidae (viperids)	True vipers and pit vipers, including rattlesnakes and copperheads and cottonmouths.

== Types ==
Antivenom	Species	Country
Polyvalent snake antivenom	South American Rattlesnake Crotalus durissus and fer-de-lance Bothrops asper	Mexico (Instituto Bioclon)
Polyvalent snake antivenom	South American Rattlesnake Crotalus durissus and fer-de-lance Bothrops asper	South America
Polyvalent snake antivenom	Saw-scaled Viper Echis carinatus, Russell's Viper Daboia russelli, Spectacled Cobra Naja naja, Common Krait Bungarus caeruleus	India
Polyvalent snake antivenom	Javan spitting cobra Naja sputatrix, Bandit krait Bungarus fasciatus, Javan pit viper, Indonesian pit viper Calloselasma rhodostoma	Indonesia
Death adder antivenom	Death adder	Australia
Taipan antivenom	Taipan	Australia
Black snake antivenom	Pseudechis spp.	Australia
Tiger snake antivenom	Australian copperheads, tiger snakes, Pseudechis spp., rough scaled snake	Australia
Brown snake antivenom	Brown snakes	Australia
Polyvalent snake antivenom	Many Australian snakes	Australia
Sea snake antivenom	Sea snakes	Australia
Vipera tab	Vipera spp.	UK
EchiTabG	Echis spp.	UK
Polyvalent crotalid antivenin (CroFab - Crotalidae Polyvalent Immune Fab (Ovine))	North American pit vipers (all rattlesnakes, copperheads, and cottonmouths)	North America
Soro antibotropicocrotalico	Pit vipers and rattlesnakes	Brazil
Antielapidico	Coral snakes	Brazil
SAIMR polyvalent antivenom	Mambas, cobras, rinkhalses, puff adders (Unsuitable small adders: B. worthingtoni, B. atropos, B. caudalis, B. cornuta, B. heraldica, B. inornata, B. peringueyi, B. schneideri, B. xeropaga)	South Africa
SAIMR echis antivenom	Saw-scaled vipers	South Africa
SAIMR Boomslang antivenom	Boomslang	South Africa
Panamerican serum	Coral snakes	Costa Rica
Anticoral	Coral snakes	Costa Rica
Anti-mipartitus antivenom	Coral snakes	Costa Rica
Anticoral monovalent	Coral snakes	Costa Rica
West, Central and Eastern Sub-Saharan Africa polyvalent (EchiTAb-plus-ICP)	Carpet vipers (E. ocellatus), puff adders (B. arietans), black-necked spitting cobras (N. nigricollis)	Costa Rica
Antimicrurus	Coral snakes	Argentina
Coralmyn	Coral snakes	Mexico
Anti-micruricoscorales	Coral snakes	Colombia

== Regulations ==
- Human Medicine: In the United States, antivenom production and distribution is regulated by the Food and Drug Administration.
- Veterinary Medicine: In the United States, antivenom production and distribution is regulated by the United States Department of Agriculture's Center for Veterinary Biologics.

== Research ==
=== Monoclonal ===
In addition to polyvalent antibody (pAb) antivenom produced by naturally immunizing animals, monoclonal antibodies (mAbs) have also been studied for venom neutralization. mAbs are produced by clones of the same blood cell, so each type of mAb product all contains the same antibody molecule. This is a lot more predictable than a mixture of pAbs. A number of mAbs (and cocktail of mAbs), some natural, some artificially modified, have been studied as potential future antivenoms. The ones chosen are typically broadly neutralizing antibodies (bnAbs), which means that they are able to bind a broad spectrum of related toxins.

American snake collector Tim Friede self-inoculated with venom from many species of snakes in decades of hobbyist experimentation and developed considerable immunity. A 2025 paper analyzes his blood and discovered two bnAbs against short- and long-chain three-finger toxins, a common family of venom toxins found in snakes. Friede's immune system have been trained to produce these antibodies that bind to parts common to these families of toxins. When these two bn-mAbs are combined with varespladib, which inhibits secretory phospholipase A2 (another common class of snake toxin), the combination was highly effective on mice for snake venom from 13 out of 19 tested elapid species and "partially effective" for the rest. It offers no resistance to viper venom, which operate using a different mechanism (metalloproteinase) to attack tissues and the cardiovascular system.

Human mAbs can also be created without actually inoculating humans using cultured B cells and phage display technology. The process of affinity maturation can be performed in vitro.

Other forms of venom-binding proteins, such as artificially-designed ones, also show promise in animal models.
