= List of snakes of Africa =

This list of snakes of Africa includes all snakes in the continent of Africa.

- Philothamnus natalensis;
- Echis megalocephalus;
- Echis leucogaster
- Roman's carpet viper
- Naja melanoleuca;
- all species of the genus Afrotyphlops;
- Bitis caudalis;
- Bitis peringueyi;
- Bitis heraldica
- Dispholidus typus;
- Spitting cobra (Many species);
- Dendroaspis polylepis;
- Vipera monticola
- Namibiana rostrata;
- Malpolon moilensis;
- Bitis gabonica;
- Afrotyphlops schlegelii;
- Berg adder;
- Amblyodipsas;
- Aparallactus lunulatus
- Bicoloured blind snake;
- Amblyodipsas concolor;
- Amblyodipsas dimidiata;
- Amblyodipsas katangensis;
- Amblyodipsas polylepis;
- Puff adder;
- Bitis heraldica;
- Bitis nasicornis;
- Calabar python;
- Damara threadsnake;
- Calabresi's blind snake;
- Dasypeltis confusa;
- Cape cobra;
- Dasypeltis scabra;
- Cape file snake;
- Drewes's worm snake;
- Cape wolf snake;
- Dwarf water cobra;
- Damara threadsnake;
- Dasypeltis confusa;
- Dasypeltis sahelensis
- Polemon neuwiedi;
- Polemon ater;
- Polemon christyi;
- Red adder
- Thelotornis kirtlandii
- all species of the genus Boaedon
- all species of the genus Prosymna
