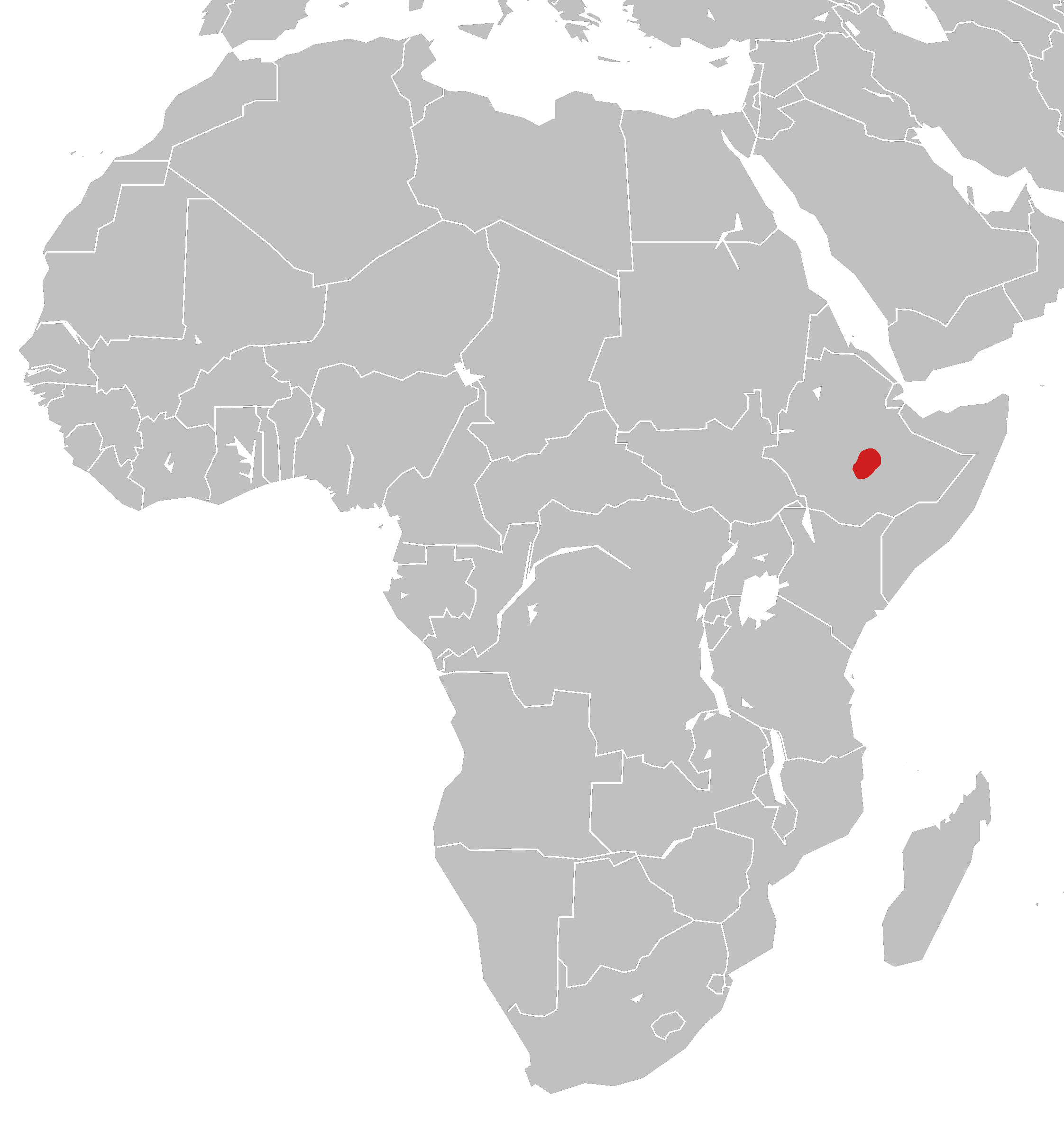
- Bitis harenna distribution

Scientific classification
- Kingdom: Animalia
- Phylum: Chordata
- Class: Reptilia
- Order: Squamata
- Suborder: Serpentes
- Family: Viperidae
- Genus: Bitis
- Species: B. harenna

Binomial name
- Bitis harenna Gower, Wade, Spawls, Böhme, Buechley, Bribiesca Sykes, Colston. 2016

= Bitis harenna =

Species of snake

Bitis harenna, or the Bale Mountains adder, is a relatively unknown species of viper from and named after the Harenna Forest in the Oromia Region of Ethiopia. It is often mixed up with the Bitis parviocula in multiple scientific papers, as both it and B. parviocula lack horns between nostrils, as well as sharing specific numbers of specific scales and a pale 'cross bar' marking on the head behind the eyes. However, it can be told apart from all other Macrocerastes (or 'Bitis') species by their unique colouring, markings and braincase. The species has only been officially sighted at a length of 66 cm to 1 m.

== Known specimens ==
There is only one known museum specimen. Collected from Dodola, likely in the 1960s. This female specimen was misidentified as a B. parviocula with odd markings. The specimen was 66.5 cm long and had a circumference up to 10 cm. Its head was 3.15 cm wide, and 4.48 cm long. The specimen is badly damaged, with its skull caved in and an incision 15 cm from the snout.

In 2013, an individual of the species was sighted and photographed in the Bale Mountains National Park, likely close to a meter long. The length of its tail suggested to the researchers that the live specimen was male.

== Description ==
Bitis harenna is similar (and has often been confused for) B. parviocula as they both lack horns between their nostrils, have less than four scales between their rostral and first supralabial, and share a pale 'cross bar' marking on the dorsal surface behind their eyes.

However, B. harenna is unique to all other species of the subgenus Macrocerastes due to their limited concavity on the lateral wall of the braincase, their majority black colouring on their dorsal side (extending mid-dorsally between the nostrils) with slim and pale cream markings and their lack of a regular parallel-sided mid-dorsal stripe. The species also has distinct divided upper flank dorsal scale rows, and fused lower flank rows.

Its darker colouring differs B. harenna from B. rhinoceros and B. gabonica which share a more pale head colouring, its lack of posteriorly notched scales differs B. harenna from B. nasicornis, and its frontals with facets and its lack of subhorizontal ridge on the prootic differ B. harenna from the very similar B. parviocula.
