= Vipera ocellata =

Vipera ocellata is a taxonomic synonym that may refer to:

- Vipera aspis, a.k.a. the asp viper, a venomous viper species found in southwestern Europe
- Bitis caudalis, a.k.a. the horned puff adder, a venomous viper species found in the arid region of south-west Africa
