= Echidne =

Echidne may refer to:

- Echidna (mythology), the "Mother of All Monsters" in Greek mythology
- Echidne (snake), a synonym for Bitis, a genus of African vipers
