= Horned puff adder =

Horned puff adder may refer to:

- Bitis caudalis, a.k.a. the horned adder, a venomous viper species found in the arid region of south-west Africa
- Bitis nasicornis, a.k.a. the rhinoceros viper, a venomous viper found in the forests of West and Central Africa
