= Lethal toxin neutralizing factor =

The Lethal Toxin Neutralizing Factor, or LTNF, is a protein found in the blood serum of opossum. The North American Opossum (Didelphis virginiana) is notable for its ability to live through snake bites. The protein could potentially be used to treat most snake bites as it is capable of neutralizing the venom of major snake families. Furthermore, most modern antivenoms come from horse proteins to which many people are allergic. The molecular weight of LTNF is about 63 kDa.
