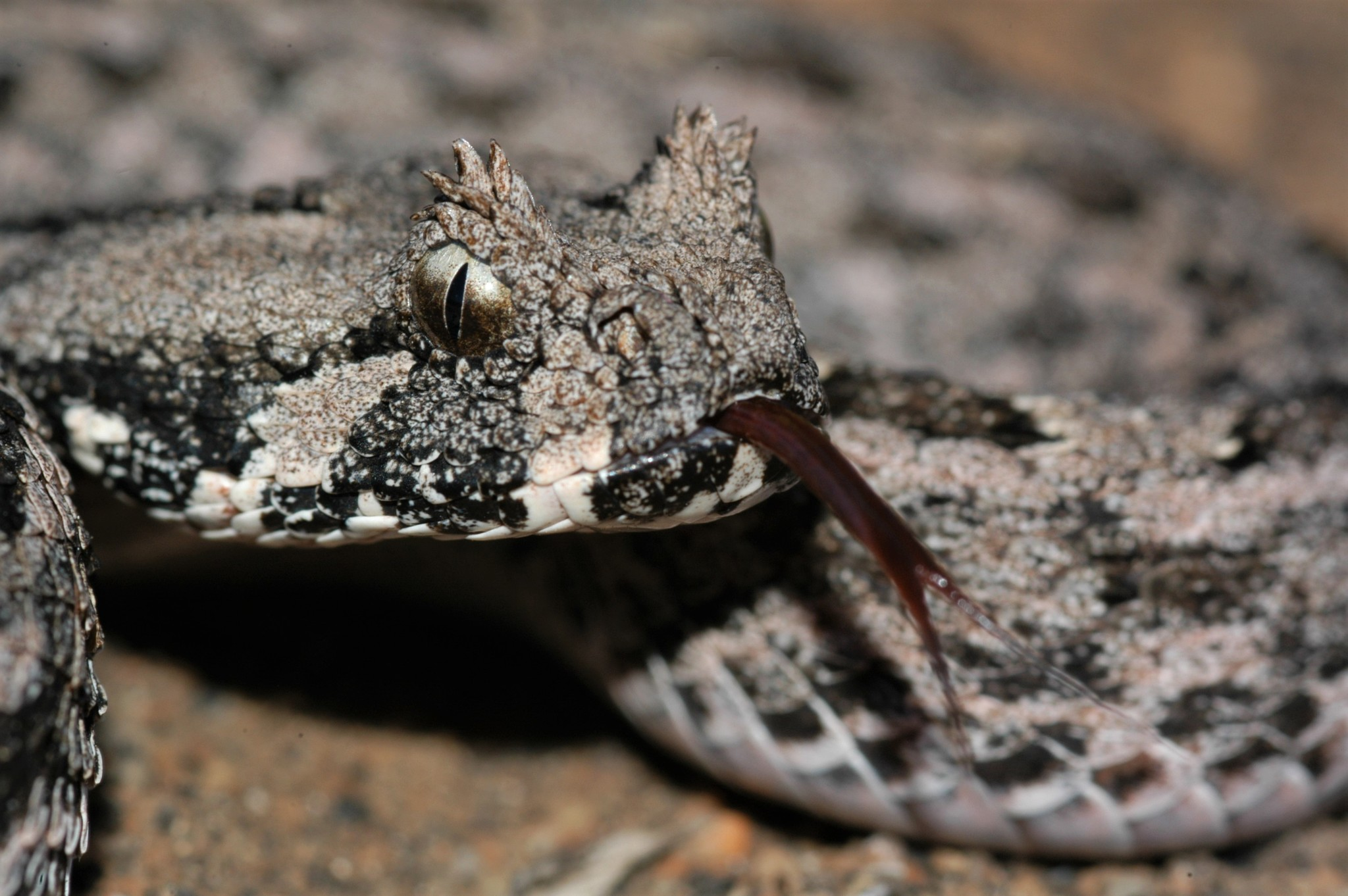

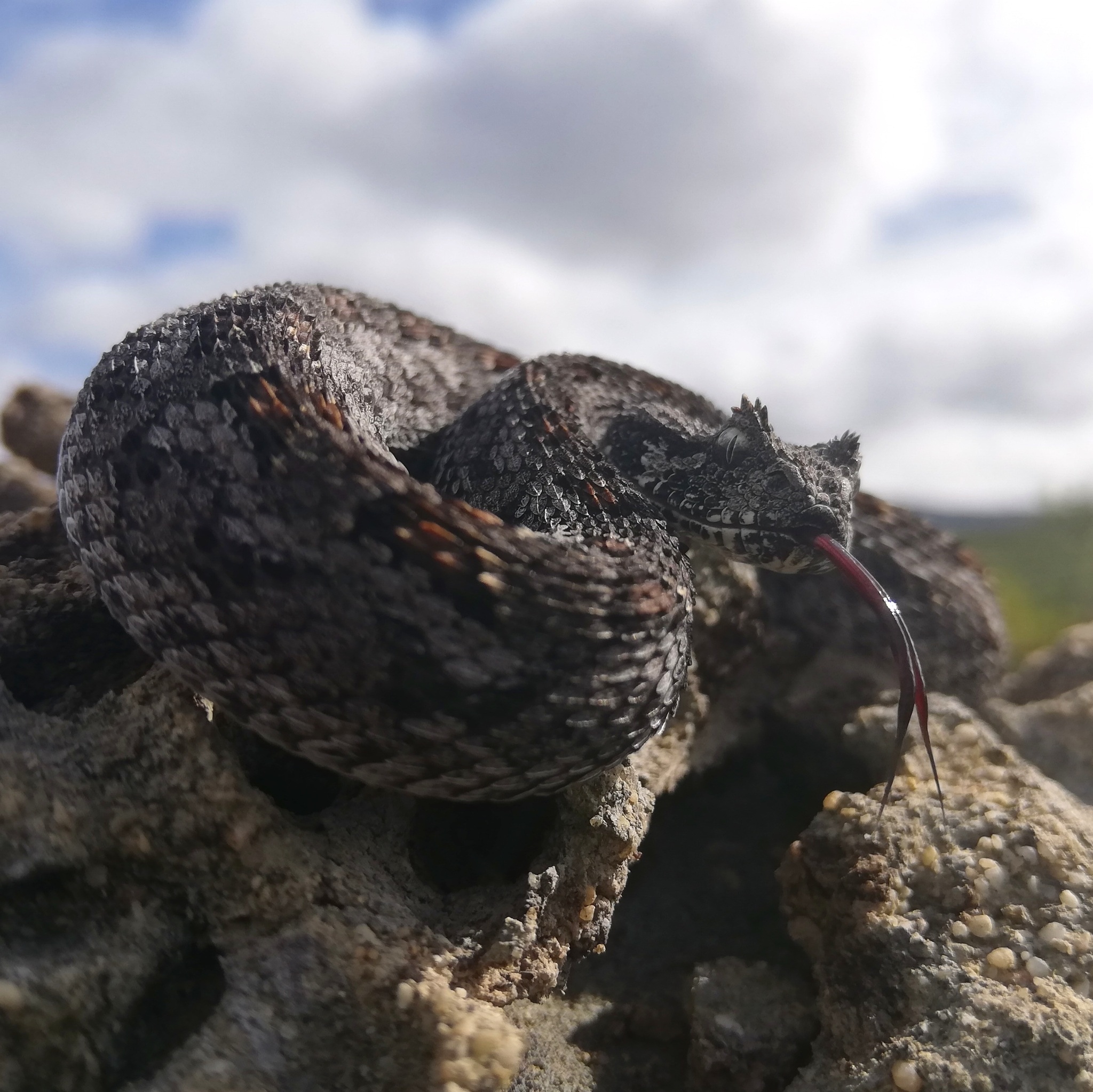

Conservation status
- Vulnerable (IUCN 3.1)

Scientific classification
- Kingdom: Animalia
- Phylum: Chordata
- Class: Reptilia
- Order: Squamata
- Suborder: Serpentes
- Family: Viperidae
- Genus: Bitis
- Species: B. armata

Binomial name
- Bitis armata (A. Smith, 1826)

= Southern adder =

Species of snake

The southern adder (Bitis armata) is an endangered species of venomous snake in the family Viperidae. It is endemic to the Western Cape in South Africa.

== Description ==
The southern adder averages 20 cm in length (with a maximum length of 40 cm). It has two white bands beneath and between the eye. It has horned tufts above the eyes. The southern adder is greyish-brown in colour, with dark brown patterning down the centre.

== Distribution ==
The southern adder is found in three separate subpopulations on the southwestern coastal margins of the Western Cape. Previously, a fourth subpopulation in Cape Town is thought to be locally extinct. The northern subpopulation is found from West Coast National Park to approximately 20 km north of Cape Town. The southeastern subpopulation is found near Hermanus and near De Hoop Nature Reserve.

== Habitat and Ecology ==
The southern adder is found near limestone rock in Fynbos vegetation.
