= Hedgehog leaf-toed gecko =

Scientific classification
- Kingdom: Animalia
- Phylum: Chordata
- Class: Reptilia
- Order: Squamata
- Suborder: Gekkota
- Family: Gekkonidae
- Genus: Hemidactylus
- Species: H. echinus

Binomial name
- Hemidactylus echinus O'Shaughnessy, 1875

Species of lizard

The hedgehog leaf-toed gecko (Hemidactylus echinus) is a species of gecko. It is found in Central Africa (Cameroon, Democratic Republic of the Congo, and Gabon, although the latter is disputed).
