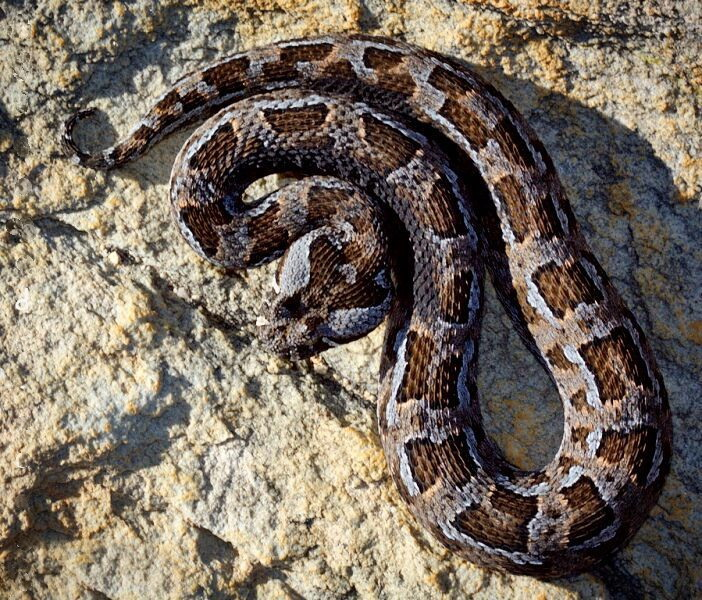

Conservation status
- Least Concern (IUCN 3.1)

Scientific classification
- Kingdom: Animalia
- Phylum: Chordata
- Class: Reptilia
- Order: Squamata
- Suborder: Serpentes
- Family: Viperidae
- Genus: Bitis
- Species: B. rubida

Binomial name
- Bitis rubida Branch, 1997

Synonyms
- Bitis inornata — FitzSimons, 1946 (part); Bitis cornuta albanica — FitzSimons, 1962 (part); Bitis cornuta cornuta — Haacke, 1975 (part); Bitis cornuta cornuta — Visser, 1979 (part); Bitis caudalis — Visser, 1979 (part); Bitis cornuta inornata — Broadley, 1983 (part); Bitis inornata — Branch, 1988 (part); Bitis cornuta albanica — Broadley, 1990 (part); Bitis inornata — M. Burger, 1992 (part); B[itis]. cornuta albanica — M. Burger, 1992 (part); B[itis]. inornata — M. Burger, 1993 (part); B[itis]. cornuta albanica — M. Burger, 1993 (part); Bitis inornata — Spawls & Branch, 1995 (part); Bitis inornata — Branch & Bauer, 1995 (part); Bitis rubida Branch, 1997

= Red adder =

Species of snake

The red adder (Bitis rubida) is a viper species found only in Western Cape Province, South Africa. No subspecies are currently recognised. Like all other vipers, it is venomous.

== Taxonomy ==
Bitis rubida was described as a new species in 1997 by William Roy "Bill" Branch. Prior to that time, specimens of this snake had been identified as belonging to several other species and subspecies of the genus Bitis (see "Synonyms" in "Taxobox"). The type locality given is "Jeep track above Farm Driehoek, Cederberg Mountains, Western Cape Province, South Africa; 32°25'44"S, 19°12'30"E, alt. 1380 m [4,528 ft]; 3219AC."

The common name is "red adder".

== Description ==
Maximum recorded total lengths (body + tail) are 41.9 cm (16.5 in) for females and 37.7 cm (14.8 in) for males.

== Distribution and habitat ==
Several isolated populations are found in the northern Cape Fold Mountains and inland escarpment in Western Cape Province, South Africa.
