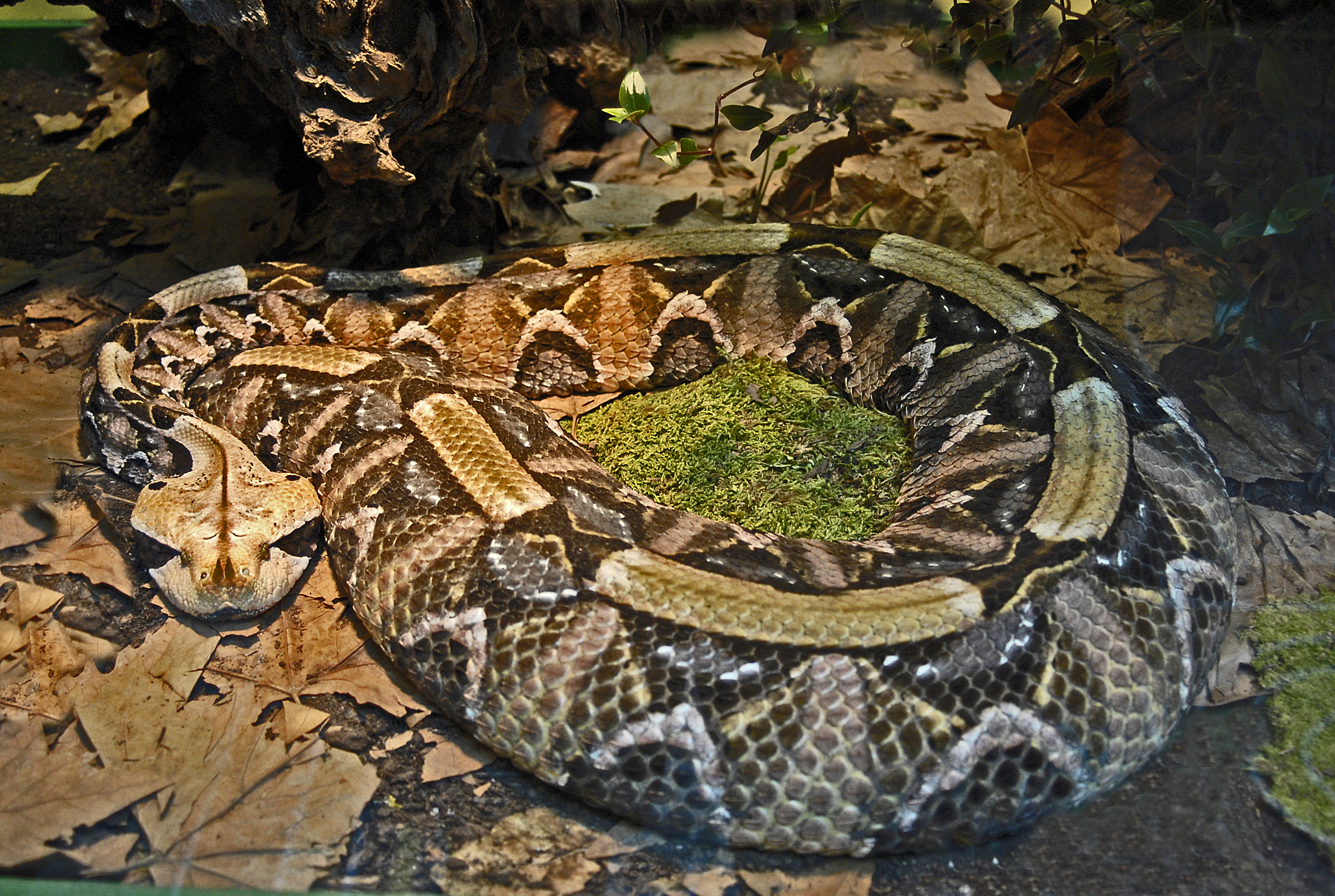

Conservation status
- Least Concern (IUCN 3.1)

Scientific classification
- Kingdom: Animalia
- Phylum: Chordata
- Class: Reptilia
- Order: Squamata
- Suborder: Serpentes
- Family: Viperidae
- Genus: Bitis
- Species: B. rhinoceros

Binomial name
- Bitis rhinoceros (Schlegel, 1855)

Synonyms
- Vipera rhinoceros Schlegel, 1855; Echidna rhinoceros — A.H.A. Duméril, 1856; C[lotho]. rhinoceros — Cope, 1860; V[ipera]. (Echidna) rhinoceros — Jan, 1863; Vipera (Bitis) rhinoceros — W. Peters, 1877; Bitis rhinoceros — W. Peters, 1882; Bitis gabonica rhinoceros — Mertens, 1951; Bitis (Macrocerastes) rhinoceros — Lenk et al., 1999; Bitis rhinoceros — Dobiey & Vogel, 2007

= Bitis rhinoceros =

Species of snake

Bitis rhinoceros is a viper species also known by the common names West African Gaboon viper, and Gabino viper, endemic to West Africa. Like all vipers, it is venomous.

== Description ==
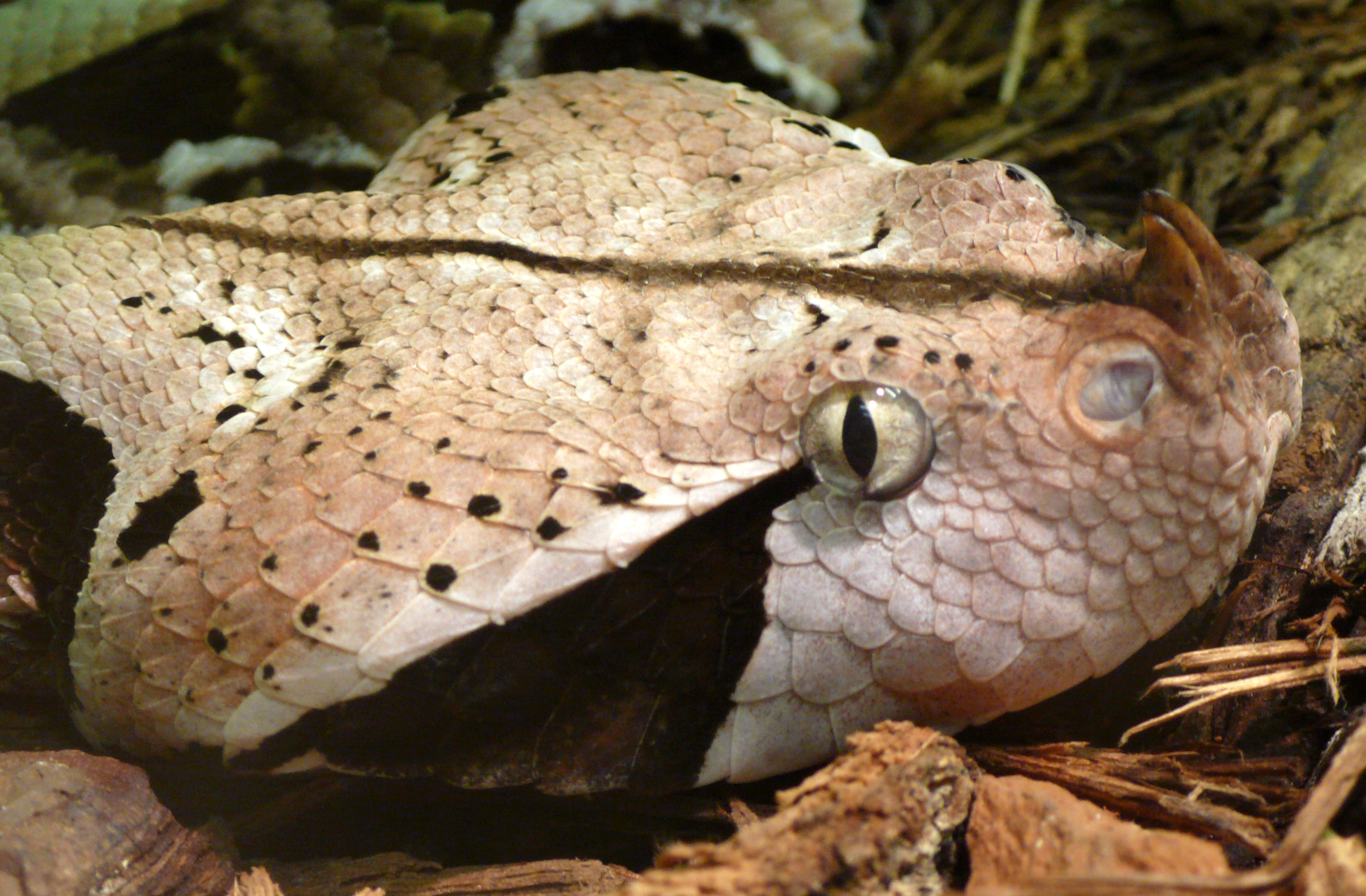
Close-up of the head

Bitis rhinoceros has a distinctive set of enlarged nasal scales that look like a pair of horns on its nose. This is a characteristic that it shares with a close relative, B. nasicornis. However, B. nasicornis has a brighter color pattern and a narrower head. B. gabonica is overall somewhat smaller than B. rhinoceros. Also, in B. g. gabonica, the dark triangular marking leading back from the eye towards the angle of the mouth is divided. In B. rhinoceros it is not.

== Geographic range ==
B. rhinoceros is found in West Africa from Togo west to Guinea and possibly to Guinea-Bissau, including the intervening countries (Ghana, Ivory Coast, Liberia, and Sierra Leone).

According to Spawls & Branch (1995), Ghana and Togo are at the eastern limit of the range of this subspecies, and they begin to intergrade here with B. gabonica. The distribution map they provide indicates that the general range for B. rhinoceros does not include Togo, but that there has been at least one report of a specimen found there. The distribution of B. rhinoceros now includes Nigeria. Residents of Ota, a small community in Ogun State, Southwestern Nigeria sighted one in 2022. Togo, together with Benin and at least eastern Ghana, are part of a larger region known as the Dahomey Gap; a relatively dry region that separates the rainforests of West Africa from those of Central Africa.
