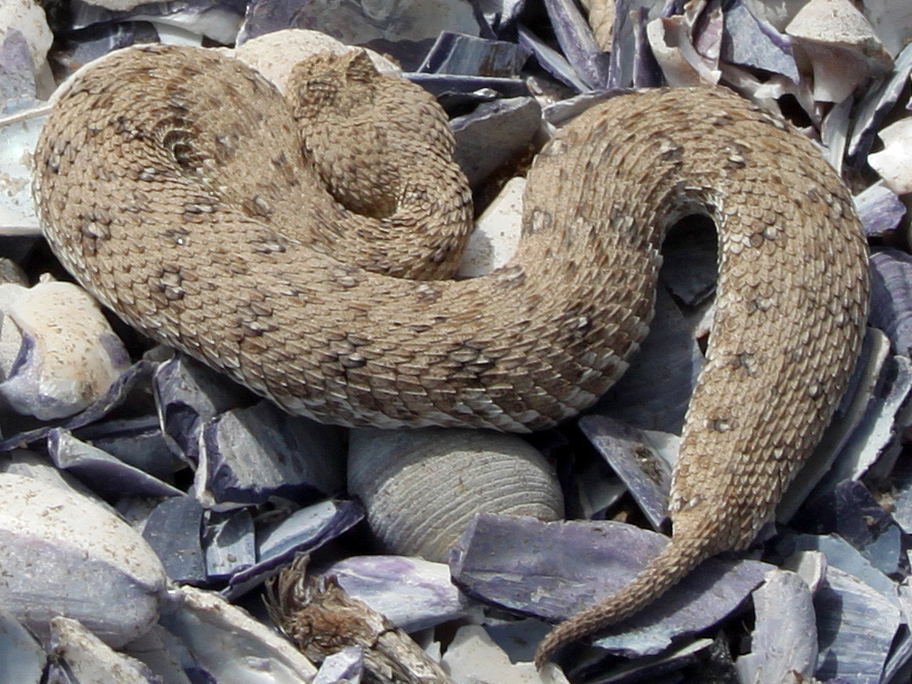

Conservation status
- Least Concern (IUCN 3.1)

Scientific classification
- Kingdom: Animalia
- Phylum: Chordata
- Class: Reptilia
- Order: Squamata
- Suborder: Serpentes
- Family: Viperidae
- Genus: Bitis
- Species: B. schneideri

Binomial name
- Bitis schneideri (Boettger, 1886)

Synonyms
- Vipera Schneideri Boettger, 1886; Bitis caudalis paucisquamatis Mertens, 1954; Bitis paucisquamata — FitzSimons, 1962; Bitis caudalis paucisquamata — Klemmer, 1963; Bitis paucisquamatis — FitzSimons, 1966; Bitis schneideri — Haacke, 1975

= Bitis schneideri =

Species of snake

Common names: Namaqua dwarf adder, spotted dwarf adder, Schneider's adder.

Bitis schneideri is a species of venomous snake in the subfamily Viperinae of the family Viperidae. The species is native to a small coastal region that straddles the border between Namibia and South Africa. B. schneideri is the smallest species in the genus Bitis and possibly the world's smallest viper. There are no subspecies that are currently recognized as being valid.

== Etymology ==
The specific name, schneideri, was given by Oskar Boettger in honor of "Dr. Oskar Schneider in Dresden ", a friend of Boettger. Oskar Schneider (1841–1903) was a conchologist.

== Description ==
With an average total length (including tail) of 18–25 cm (7–10 in) and a maximum reported total length of 28 cm (11 in), B. schneideri is the smallest species of the genus Bitis and possibly the world's smallest viperid.

== Geographic range and habitat ==
Bitis schneideri ranges from the white coastal sand dunes of Namibia, near Lüderitz, south to Hondeklip Bay, Little Namaqualand, South Africa. Mallow et al. (2003) describe the range as the transitional regions of the Namib Desert. The viper's habitat comprises a comparatively narrow strip of coastal dunes that appears to be characterized by particularly low seasonality, i.e. small temperature differences between seasons. The range may extend up to 60 km (37 mi) inland in the Sperrgebiet of southern Namibia.

The type locality given is "Angra Pequenia" [ Lüderitz Bay, Namibia].

== Ecology ==
Populations of B. schneideri naturally appear to be subject to unusually high annual mortality (39–56%) due to their small size and existence in a very predator-rich environment. As a consequence, it is likely that the species has evolved a higher rate of reproduction (once every year) than is usual among viperids, who commonly only reproduce every other year or more rarely. B. schneideri is viviparous.

== Venom ==
An account is provided by Hurrell (1981) of a bite he sustained on his left index finger. The symptoms included intense pain, pronounced swelling, discoloration and oozing of serum from the punctures. After 24 hours, a 5 mm hematoma developed at the bite site. His condition stabilized after three to four days, with the swelling and pain gradually subsiding. Healing was complete after two weeks, with no loss of function or sensation of the afflicted digit. Minimal local tissue damage and no systemic effects were reported. No antivenin is available for this species.
