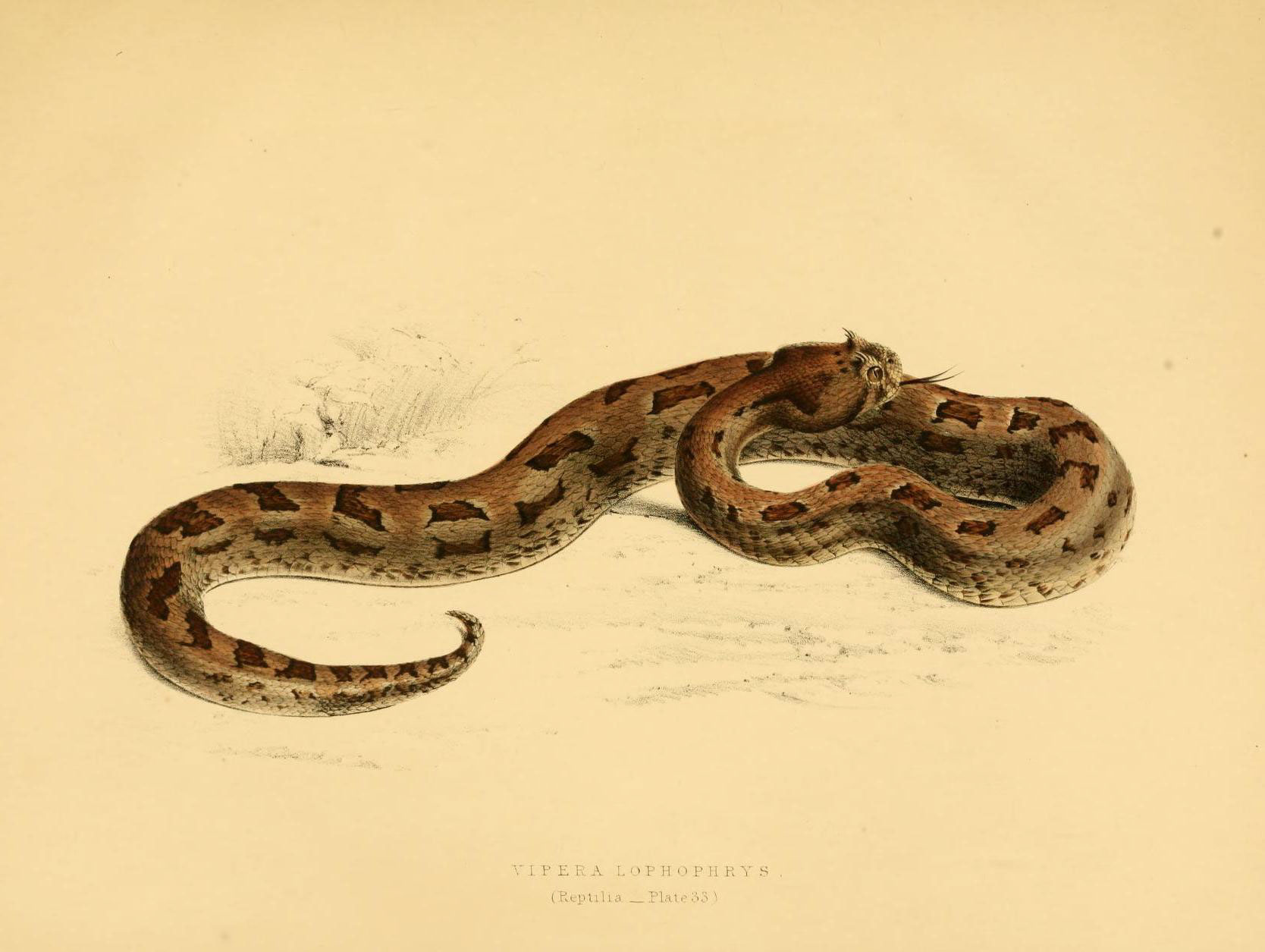

Conservation status
- Least Concern (IUCN 3.1)

Scientific classification
- Kingdom: Animalia
- Phylum: Chordata
- Class: Reptilia
- Order: Squamata
- Suborder: Serpentes
- Family: Viperidae
- Genus: Bitis
- Species: B. cornuta

Binomial name
- Bitis cornuta (Daudin, 1803)

Synonyms
- Vipera cornuta Daudin, 1803; Vip[era]. lophophris Cuvier, 1829; Vip[era]. lophophrys — Wagler, 1830; Vipera lophophris — Gray, 1831; Cerastes cornuta — Gray, 1842; Vipera (Echidna) atropoides A. Smith, 1846; Vipera atropoides — A. Smith, 1846; Clotho cornuta — Gray, 1849; Cerastes lophophrys — A.M.C. Duméril, Bibron & A.H.A. Duméril, 1854; V[ipera]. (Cerastes) cornuta — Jan, 1863; Vipera (Clotho) cornuta — Higgins, 1873; Bitis cornuta — Boulenger, 1896; Bitis cornuta cornuta — Bogert, 1940

= Many-horned adder =

Species of snake

The many-horned adder (Bitis cornuta) is a viper species. It is found in certain rocky desert areas, mostly along the Atlantic coast of southern Africa, in western South Africa and southwestern Namibia. It has characteristic tufts of "horns" above each eye. Like all other vipers, it is venomous. No subspecies are currently recognized.

== Taxonomy ==
Common names include many-horned adder, hornsman, western hornsman adder, and western many-horned adder.

The type locality given is "Cap de Bonne-espérance" (Cape of Good Hope, South Africa). Actually, according to Patterson's itinerary, the type was observed in coastal Namaqualand, on 1 September 1779.

== Description ==
Small and stout, it grows to a typical total length (body and tail) of 30–50 cm (about 12–20 inches). The maximum recorded total length is 75 cm (30 in) for a captive specimen.

Two to five raised, horn-like scales occur above each eye.

Dorsally, it has a grey to reddish-brown ground colour, overlaid with four longitudinal series of large, dark-brown blotches, which are squarish or parallelogram-like in shape, and edged with white. Ventrally, it is whitish or tan, either uniform or speckled with dark brown. On the dorsal surface of the head, dark, symmetrical markings may form an arrowhead.

== Distribution and habitat ==
The many-horned adder ranges from the coastal region of southwest Namibia through west and southwest Cape Province in South Africa, with a few isolated populations in eastern Cape Province.

This species prefers rocky desert areas in dwarf succulent veld and mountain slopes in heathland vegetation.

== Behavior ==
With a nervous disposition, when disturbed, it will hiss loudly and strike so energetically that most of its body is lifted off the ground in the process. However, it usually settles down in captivity.
