= Bitis heraldica =

Conservation status
- Vulnerable (IUCN 3.1)

Scientific classification
- Kingdom: Animalia
- Phylum: Chordata
- Class: Reptilia
- Order: Squamata
- Suborder: Serpentes
- Family: Viperidae
- Genus: Bitis
- Species: B. heraldica

Binomial name
- Bitis heraldica (Bocage, 1889)
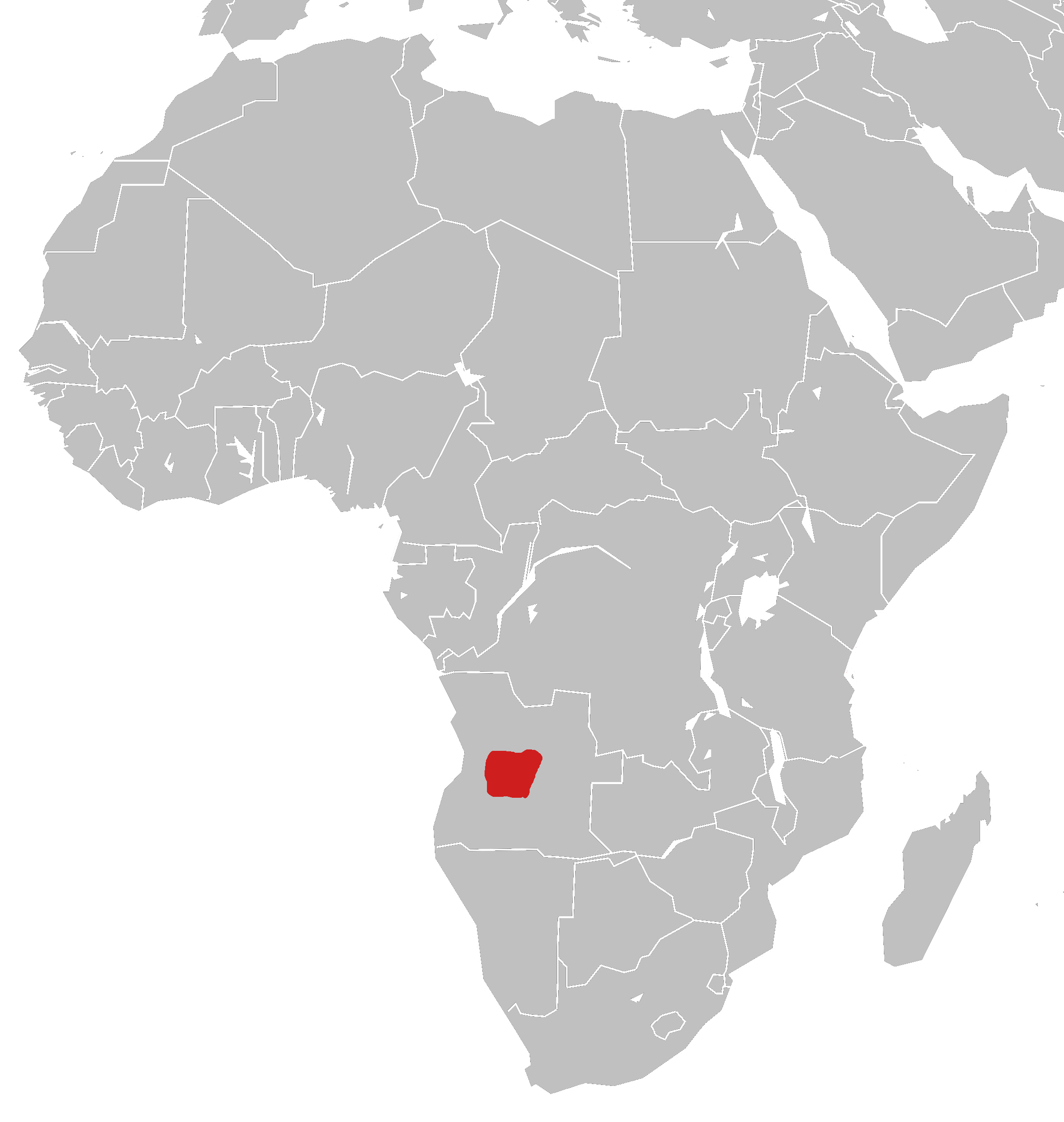

Synonyms
- Vipera heraldica Bocage, 1889; Bitis peringueyi — Boulenger, 1896; Bitis heraldica — Betherncourt-Ferreira, 1898

Species of snake

Bitis heraldica is a viper species endemic to Angola. It is easily distinguished from B. caudalis by its heavily speckled belly and lack of any supraocular "horns". No subspecies are currently recognized.

== Taxonomy ==
Its common names include Angolan adder and Bocage's horned adder.

== Description ==
The maximum recorded total length (body + tail) is 405 mm (15.9 in).

== Distribution and habitat ==
It is found on the high plateau of central Angola.

The type locality given is "sur les bords de la rivière Calae, l'un des affluents de Cunene, entre le 13^{o} et 14^{o} parallèle á l'est de Caconda." [Calai River (tributary of the Kunene), Cacanda, Angola.

It commonly inhabits rocky mountain slopes.

== Behavior ==
Nothing is known of its behavior, as less than 20 specimens have ever been collected.

== Venom ==
Nothing is known of the venom composition, and no bites have ever been recorded.
