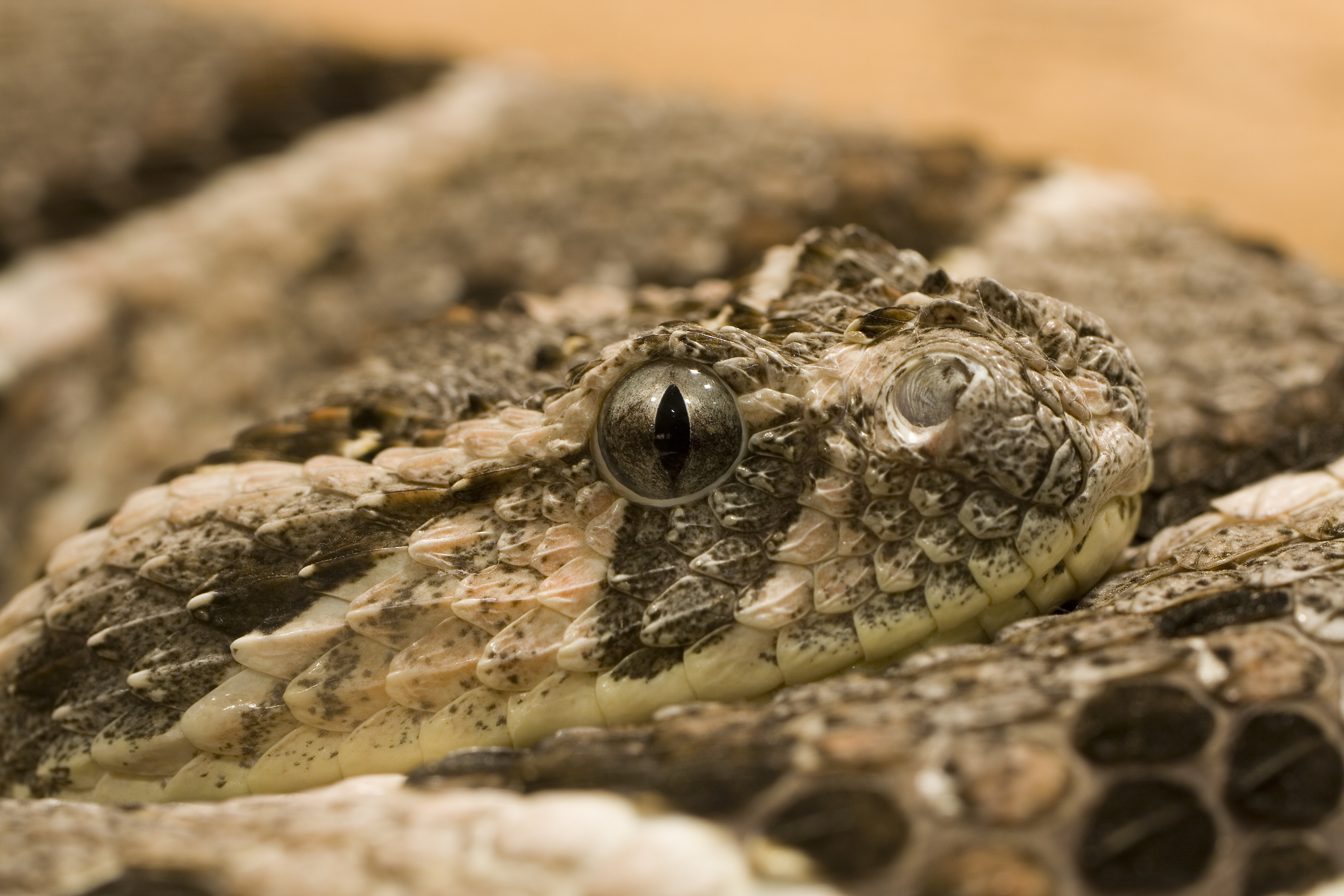
- Bitis arietans

Scientific classification
- Kingdom: Animalia
- Phylum: Chordata
- Class: Reptilia
- Order: Squamata
- Suborder: Serpentes
- Family: Viperidae
- Subfamily: Viperinae
- Genus: Bitis; Gray, 1842
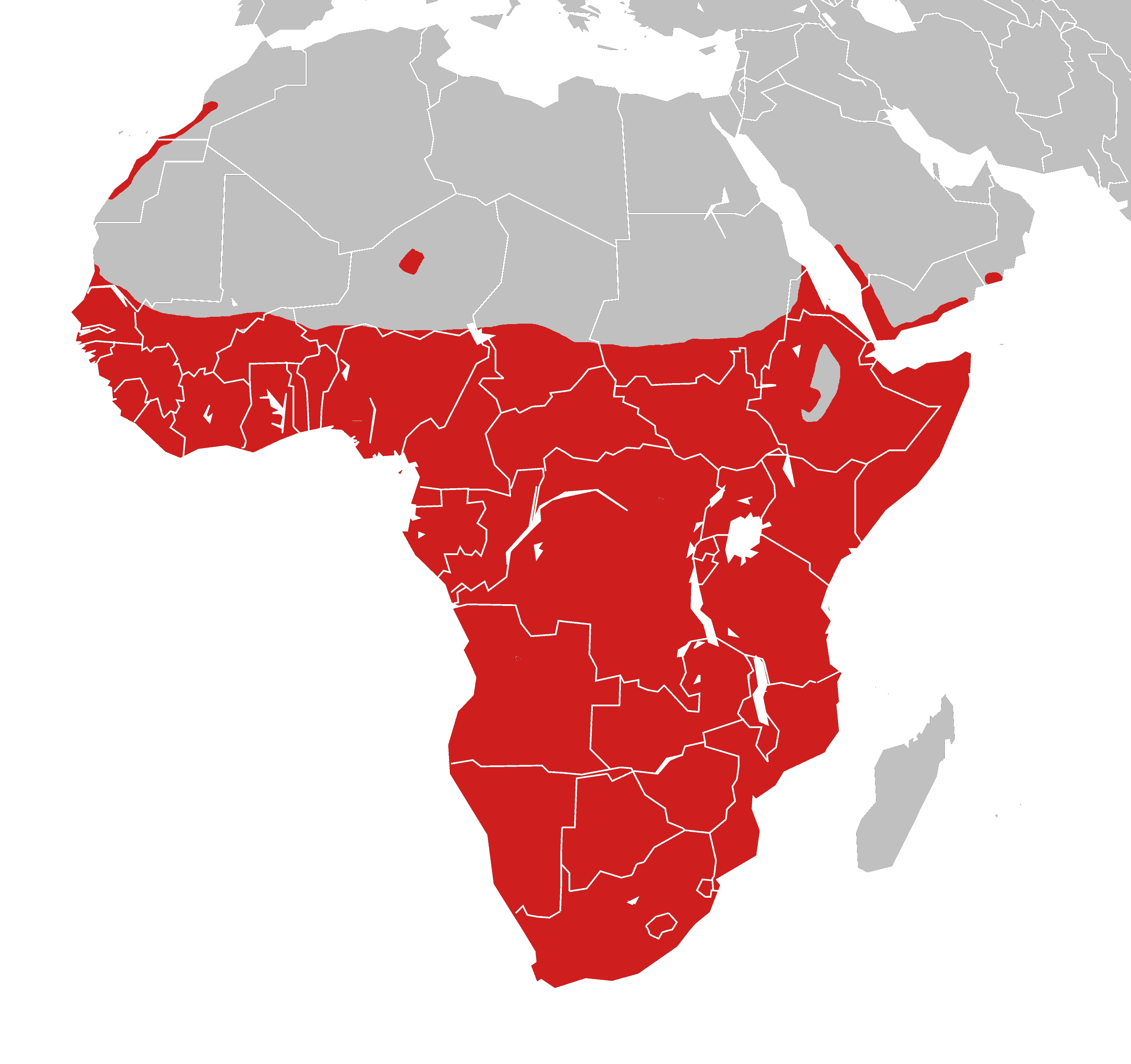

Synonyms
- Cobra Laurenti, 1768; Echidna Merrem, 1820; Clotho Gray, 1842; Bitis Gray, 1842; Echidne A.M.C. Duméril & Bibron, 1844; Hallowellius A.F. Reuss, 1939; Macrocerastes A.F. Reuss, 1939

= Bitis =

Genus of snakes

Bitis is a genus of vipers found in Africa and the southern Arabian Peninsula. It includes the largest and the smallest vipers in the world. Members are known for their characteristic threat displays that involve inflating and deflating their bodies while hissing and puffing loudly. The type species for this genus is B. arietans, which is also the most widely distributed viper in Africa. Currently, 18 species are recognized.

Members of the genus are commonly known as African adders, African vipers, or puff adders.

== Description ==
Size variation within the genus Bitis is extreme, ranging from the very small B. schneideri, which grows to a maximum total length (tail included) of 28 cm (11 in) and is perhaps the world's smallest viperid, to the very large B. gabonica, which can attain a total length over 2 m (6.6 ft) and is the heaviest viper in the world.

All have a wide, triangular head with a rounded snout, distinct from the neck, and covered in small, keeled, imbricated scales. The canthus is also distinct. A number of species have enlarged rostral or supraorbital scales that resemble horns. Their eyes are relatively small. They have large nostrils that are directed outwards and/or upwards. Up to six rows of small scales separate the rostral and nasal scales. All species have a well-developed supranasal sac. The fronts of the maxillary bones are very short, supporting only one pair of recurved fangs.

These snakes are moderately to extremely stout. Their bodies are covered with keeled scales that are imbricated (overlapping) with apical pits. At midbody, the dorsal scales number 21–46. Laterally, the dorsal scales may be slightly oblique. The ventral scales, which number 112–153, are large, rounded, and sometimes have slight lateral keels. Their tails are short. The anal scale is single. The paired subcaudal scales number 16-37 and are sometimes keeled laterally.

== Geographic range ==
Puff adders are found in Africa and the southern Arabian Peninsula.

== Behavior ==
Bitis species are known for their behavior of inflating and deflating their bodies in loud hissing or puffing threat displays. They are terrestrial ambush predators, and appear sluggish, but can strike with amazing speed. In contrast to the pitvipers of the subfamily Crotalinae, Bitis species appear to lack heat-sensitive organs and showed no differences in their behavior in laboratory tests towards warm and cool objects that mimicked prey.

Rectilinear locomotion is very common in many Bitis species.

== Reproduction ==
All members of the genus Bitis are viviparous and some give birth to large numbers of offspring.

== Venom ==
All members of the genus Bitis are dangerous— some extremely so. At least six different polyvalent antivenoms are available. Five are produced by Aventis Pasteur (France), Pasteur Merieux (France) and SAIMR (South Africa). All of these specifically protect against B. arietans and four also cover B. gabonica. At least one protects specifically against bites from B. nasicornis: India Antiserum Africa Polyvalent. In the past, such antivenoms have been used to treat bites from other Bitis species, but with mixed results.

== Species ==
Image	Species	Taxon author	Subsp.*	Common name	Geographic range
	B. albanica	Hewitt, 1937	0	Albany adder	Republic of South Africa, Eastern Cape Province from Port Elizabeth to near Committees.
	B. arietans^{T}	(Merrem, 1820)	1	Puff adder	Most of sub-Saharan Africa south to the Cape of Good Hope, including southern Morocco, Mauritania, Senegal, Mali, southern Algeria, Guinea, Sierra Leone, Ivory Coast, Ghana, Togo, Benin, Niger, Nigeria, Chad, Sudan, Cameroon, Central African Republic, northern, eastern and southern Democratic Republic of the Congo, Uganda, Kenya, Somalia, Rwanda, Burundi, Tanzania, Angola, Zambia, Malawi, Mozambique, Zimbabwe, Botswana, Namibia, South Africa, also occurs on the Arabian peninsula, where it is found in southwestern Saudi Arabia and Yemen
	B. armata	(A. Smith, 1826)	0	Southern adder	Republic of South Africa, Southwestern Western Cape, from West Coast National Park to De Hoop Nature Reserve
	B. atropos	(Linnaeus, 1758)	0	Berg adder	Isolated populations in the mountainous areas of southern Africa: the Inyanga Highlands and Chimanimani Mountains of eastern Zimbabwe and nearby Mozambique, in South Africa along the Drakensberg Escarpments in the provinces of Transvaal, western Natal, Lesotho and eastern Free State, and in the southern coastal mountains of western and eastern Cape Province
	B. caudalis	(A. Smith, 1839)	0	Horned adder	The arid region of southwest Africa: southwest Angola, Namibia, across the Kalahari Desert of southern Botswana, into northern Transvaal and southwestern Zimbabwe, in South Africa from the northern Cape Province south to the Great Karoo
	B. cornuta	(Daudin, 1803)	0	Many-horned adder	The coastal region of southwest Namibia through west and southwest Cape Province in South Africa, with a few isolated populations in eastern Cape Province
	B. gabonica	(A.M.C. Duméril, Bibron & A.H.A. Duméril, 1854)	0	Gaboon viper	Guinea, Ghana, Togo, Nigeria, Cameroon, DR Congo, Central African Republic, southern Sudan, Uganda, Kenya, eastern Tanzania, Zambia, Malawi, eastern Zimbabwe, Mozambique, northeast KwaZulu-Natal Province in South Africa
	B. harenna	Gower, Wade, Spawls, Böhme, Buechley, Sykes & Colston, 2016	0	Bale Mountains adder	Ethiopia
	B. heraldica	(Bocage, 1889)	0	Angolan adder	The high plateau of central Angola
	B. inornata	(A. Smith, 1838)	0	Plain mountain adder	Isolated population on the Sneeuberge, eastern Cape Province, South Africa
	B. nasicornis	(Shaw, 1792)	0	Rhinoceros viper	From Guinea to Ghana in West Africa, and in Central Africa in the Central African Republic, southern Sudan, Cameroon, Gabon, Congo, DR Congo, Angola, Rwanda, Uganda and western Kenya
	B. parviocula	Böhme, 1977	0	Ethiopian mountain adder	Known from only five localities in the highlands to southwest Ethiopia, at altitudes of 1700–2800 m.
	B. peringueyi	(Boulenger, 1888)	0	Peringuey's desert adder	The Namib Desert from southern Angola to Lüderitz, Namibia
	B. rhinoceros	(Schlegel, 1855)	0	West African Gaboon viper	Guinea, Guinea-Bissau, Liberia, Sierra Leone, Ivory Coast, Ghana, Togo
	B. rubida	Branch, 1997	0	Red adder	Several isolated populations in the northern Cape Fold Mountains and inland escarpment in Western Cape Province, South Africa
	B. schneideri	(Boettger, 1886)	0	Namaqua dwarf adder	White coastal sand dunes from Namibia, near Lüderitz, south to Hondeklip Bay, Little Namaqualand, South Africa
	B. worthingtoni	Parker, 1932	0	Kenya horned viper	Restricted to Kenya's high central Rift Valley at altitudes over 1500 m
	B. xeropaga	Haacke, 1975	0	Desert mountain adder	Northwestern Cape Province in South Africa and the arid mountains of the lower Orange River basin, north into southern Namibia and Great Namaqualand as far as Aus

*) Not including the nominate subspecies.
^{T}) Type species.

== Taxonomy ==
Lenk et al. (1999) used molecular data (immunological distances and mitochondrial DNA sequences) to estimate the phylogenetic relationships among species of Bitis. They identified four major monophyletic groups for which they created four subgenera:

- Bitis – B. arietans
- Calechidna – B. albanica, B. armata, B. atropos, B. caudalis, B. cornuta, B. heraldica, B. inorata, B. peringueyi, B. rubida, B. schneideri, B. xeropaga
- Macrocerastes – B. gabonica, B. nasicornis, B. parviocula
- Keniabitis – B. worthingtoni
