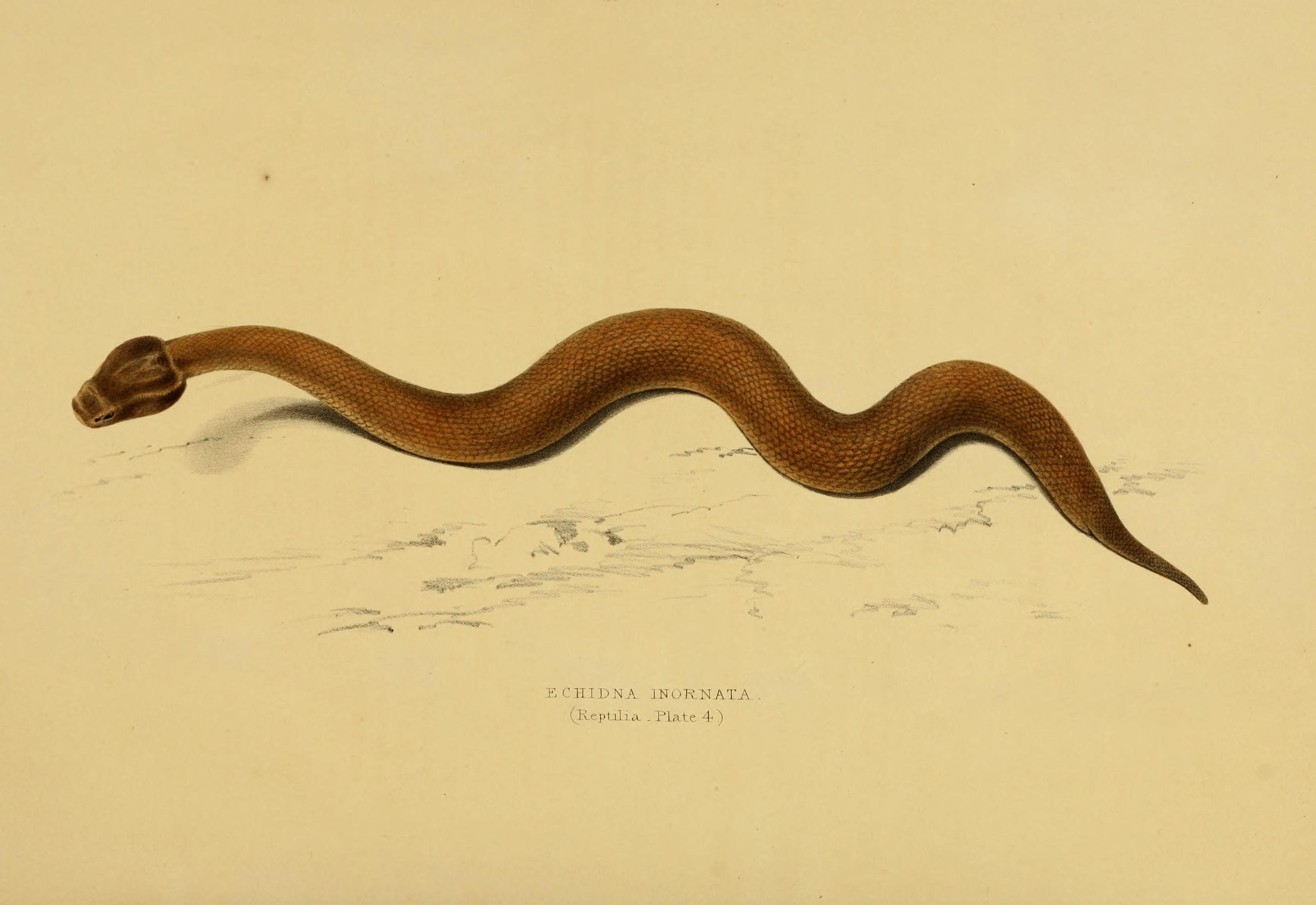
- Original illustration from A. Smith, 1838.

Conservation status
- Least Concern (IUCN 3.1)

Scientific classification
- Kingdom: Animalia
- Phylum: Chordata
- Class: Reptilia
- Order: Squamata
- Suborder: Serpentes
- Family: Viperidae
- Genus: Bitis
- Species: B. inornata

Binomial name
- Bitis inornata (A. Smith, 1838)

Synonyms
- Echidna inornata A. Smith, 1838; Clotho ? inornata Gray, 1849; Vipera inornata Strauch, 1869; Bitis inornata Boulenger, 1896; Bitis cornuta inornata Underwood, 1968; Bitis inornata Branch, 1991

= Bitis inornata =

Species of snake

Bitis inornata is a venomous viper species found only in Cape Province, South Africa. No subspecies are currently recognized.

== Common names ==
Common names for this species include plain mountain adder, hornless adder, and Cape puff adder.

== Description ==
Adults of Bitis inornata average 25–40 cm (9.8–15.7 in) in total length (including tail), with a maximum recorded total length of 45 cm (18 in).

== Geographic range ==
Bitis inornata is endemic to Cape Province, South Africa.

An isolated population exists on the Sneeuberg, eastern Cape Province, South Africa.

The type locality is listed as "Sneeuwbergen, or Snow Mountains, ... immediately behind the village of Graaff Raynet" (Eastern Cape Province, South Africa).

Spawls and Branch (1995) described it as known only from two isolated populations in southern Cape Province in South Africa: the first in the east, limited to the montane grassland of the Sneeuberge, from north of Graaff-Reinet to Cradock. A second population was discovered relatively recently on the upper slopes of the Cederberg in the west.

== Conservation status ==
The species Bitis inornata is classified as least concern on the IUCN Red List.
