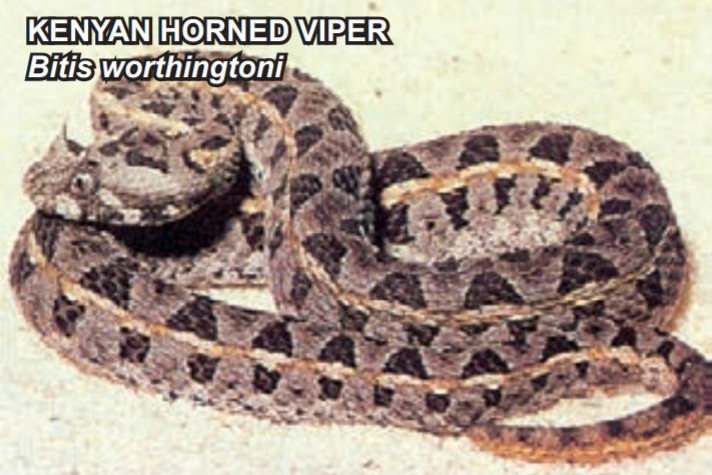

Conservation status
- Vulnerable (IUCN 3.1)
- CITES Appendix II

Scientific classification
- Kingdom: Animalia
- Phylum: Chordata
- Class: Reptilia
- Order: Squamata
- Suborder: Serpentes
- Family: Viperidae
- Genus: Bitis
- Species: B. worthingtoni

Binomial name
- Bitis worthingtoni Parker, 1932
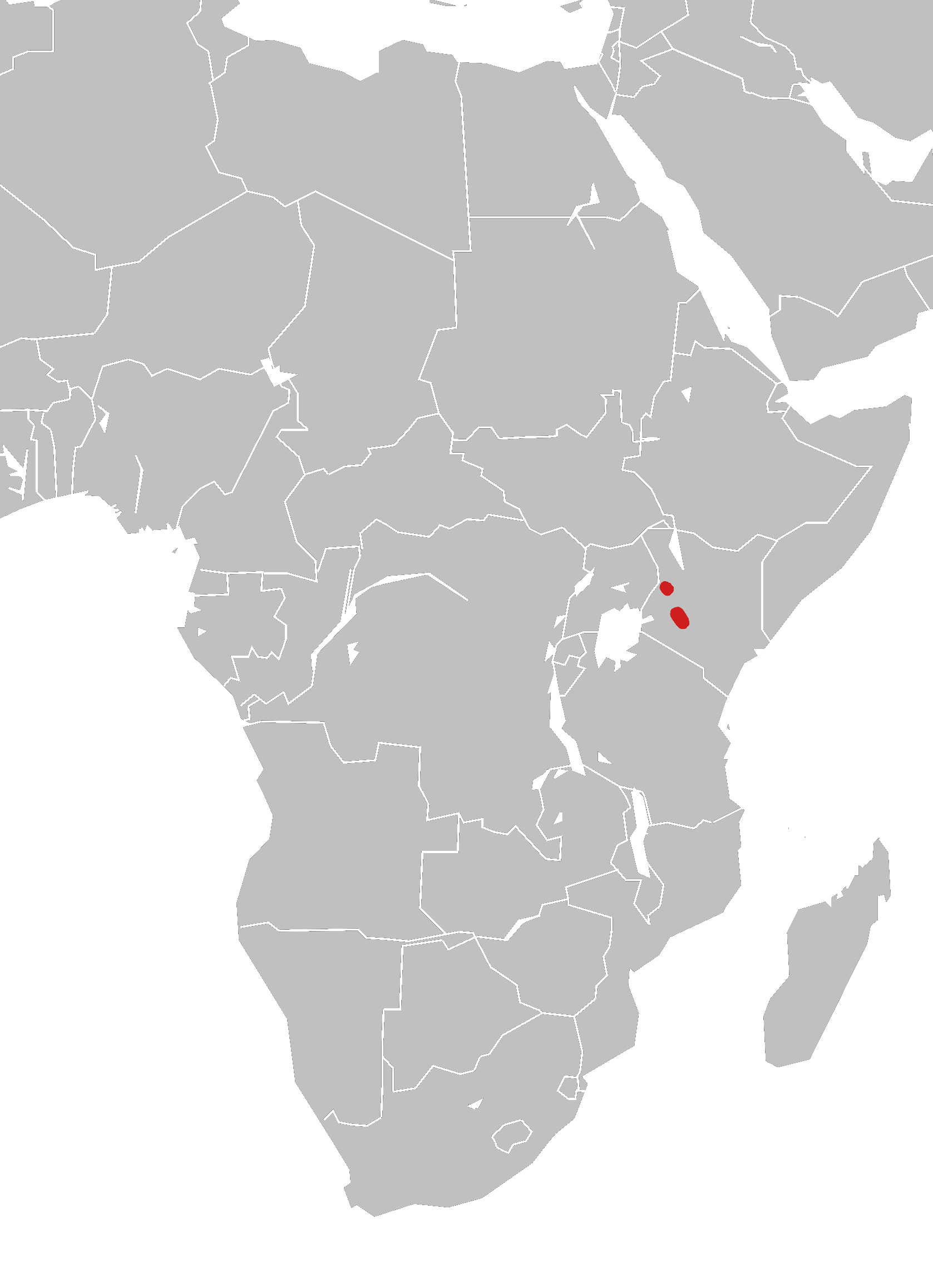

= Bitis worthingtoni =

Species of snake

Bitis worthingtoni, also known commonly as the Kenya horned viper and the Kenyan horned viper, is a species of venomous snake in the subfamily Viperinae of the family Viperidae. The species is endemic to Kenya. There are no subspecies that are recognized as being valid.

== Etymology ==
The specific name, worthingtoni, is in honor of British zoologist Edgar Barton Worthington, collector of the first specimen.

== Common names ==
Common names for B. worthingtoni include Kenya horned viper and Kenyan horned viper.

== Description ==
B. worthingtoni usually grows to a total length (including tail) of 20 to 40 cm (7.9 to 15.7 in), with a maximum total length of 50 cm (20 in).

== Geographic range and habitat ==
The preferred natural habitats of B. worthingtoni are grassland, rocky areas, savanna, and shrubland. B. worthingtoni is restricted to Kenya's high central Rift Valley at elevations of 1,500–2,500 metres (4,900–8,200 ft). The type locality given for B. worthingtoni is the "shore of Lake Naivasha [Kenya]".

== Reproduction ==
B. worthingtoni is viviparous.

== Conservation status ==
In 2004, a proposal was submitted by Kenya to have B. worthingtoni listed on CITES Appendix II. The actual status of the species was unknown, but it was reasoned that the Kenyan proposal was justified due to the species' restricted geographic range, habitat loss, demand by reptile collectors and the existence of illegal trade. In 2019, B. worthingtoni was listed as "Vulnerable" by the International Union for Conservation of Nature.
