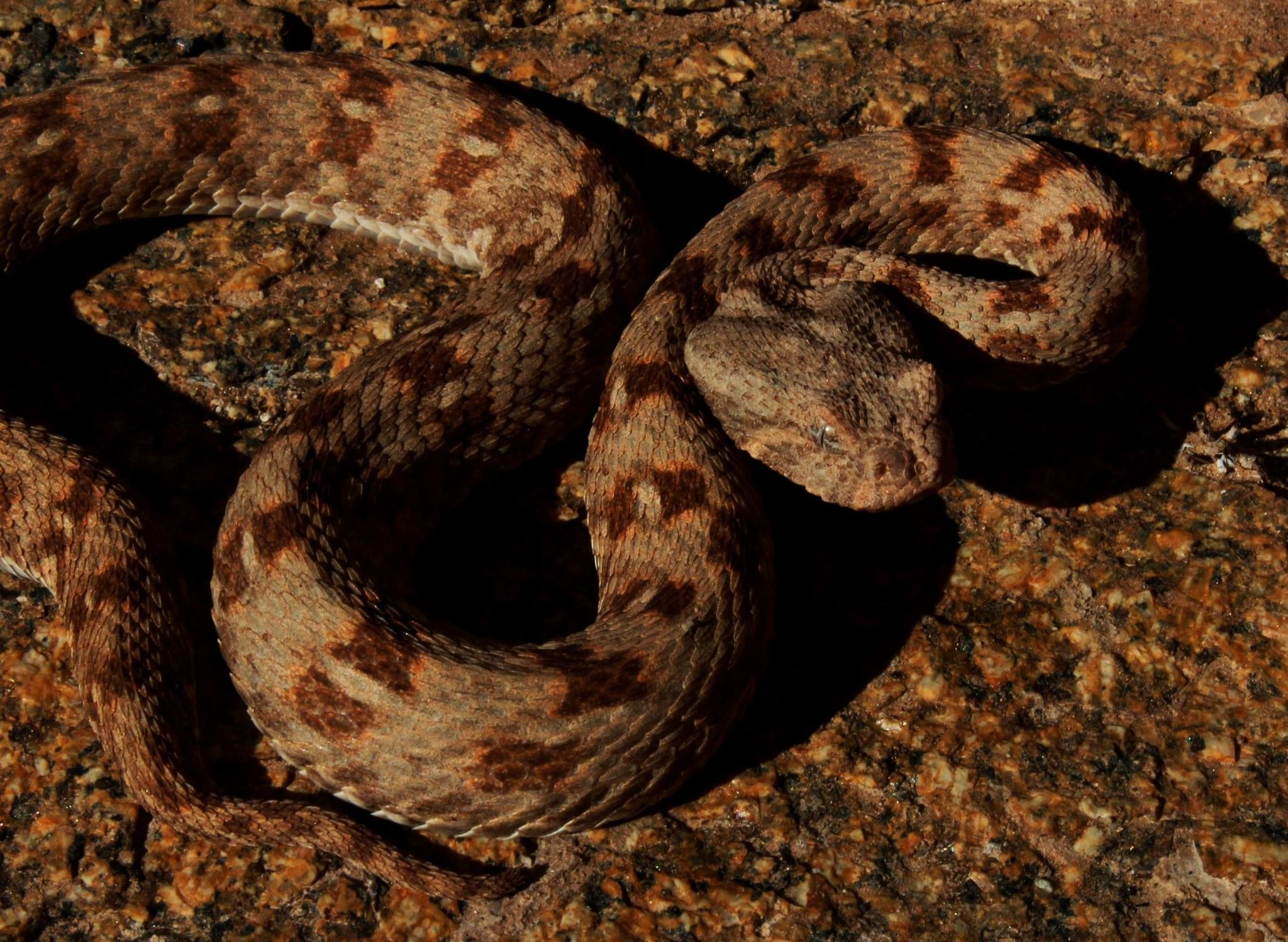

Conservation status
- Least Concern (IUCN 3.1)

Scientific classification
- Kingdom: Animalia
- Phylum: Chordata
- Class: Reptilia
- Order: Squamata
- Suborder: Serpentes
- Family: Viperidae
- Genus: Bitis
- Species: B. xeropaga

Binomial name
- Bitis xeropaga Haacke, 1975

Synonyms
- Bitis peringueyi — Nieden, 1913 (part); Bitis caudalis caudalis — Mertens, 1958 (part); Bitis xeropaga Haacke, 1975; Bitis (Calechidna) xeropaga — Lenk et al., 1999; Bitis xeropaga — McDiarmid, Campbell & Touré, 1999

= Bitis xeropaga =

Species of snake

Bitis xeropaga, commonly known as the desert mountain adder or Lüderitz dwarf viper, is a viper species found in southern Namibia and northwestern Cape Province in South Africa. Like all other vipers, it is venomous. No subspecies are currently recognized.

== Description ==
Adults average 40 to 50 cm (16 to 20 in) total length (body + tail), with a maximum total length of 61 cm (24 in) for a female.

== Geographic range ==
Northwestern Cape Province in South Africa and the arid mountains of the lower Orange River basin, north into southern Namibia and Great Namaqualand as far as Aus is the range for this snake.

The type locality given is "Dreigratberg on north bank of Orange River, Lüderitz district, South West Africa [Namibia] (16°52' E, 28°05' S, alt. about 300 m [980 ft])".
