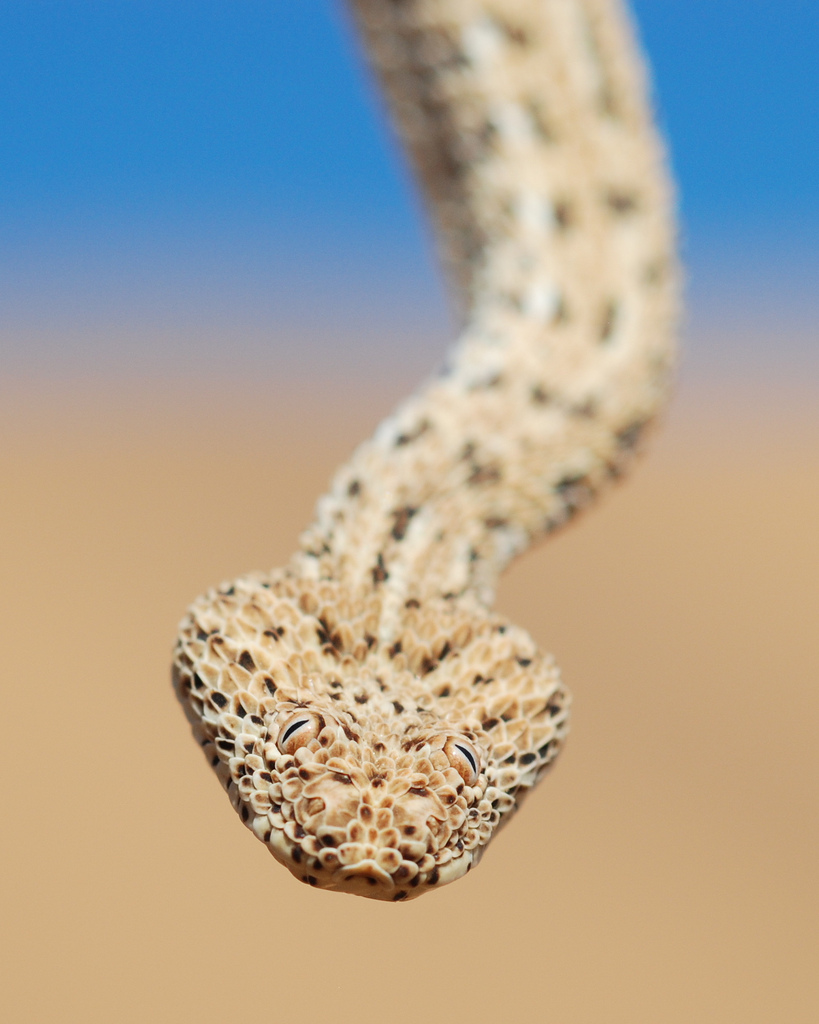

Conservation status
- Least Concern (IUCN 3.1)

Scientific classification
- Kingdom: Animalia
- Phylum: Chordata
- Class: Reptilia
- Order: Squamata
- Suborder: Serpentes
- Family: Viperidae
- Genus: Bitis
- Species: B. peringueyi

Binomial name
- Bitis peringueyi (Boulenger, 1888)
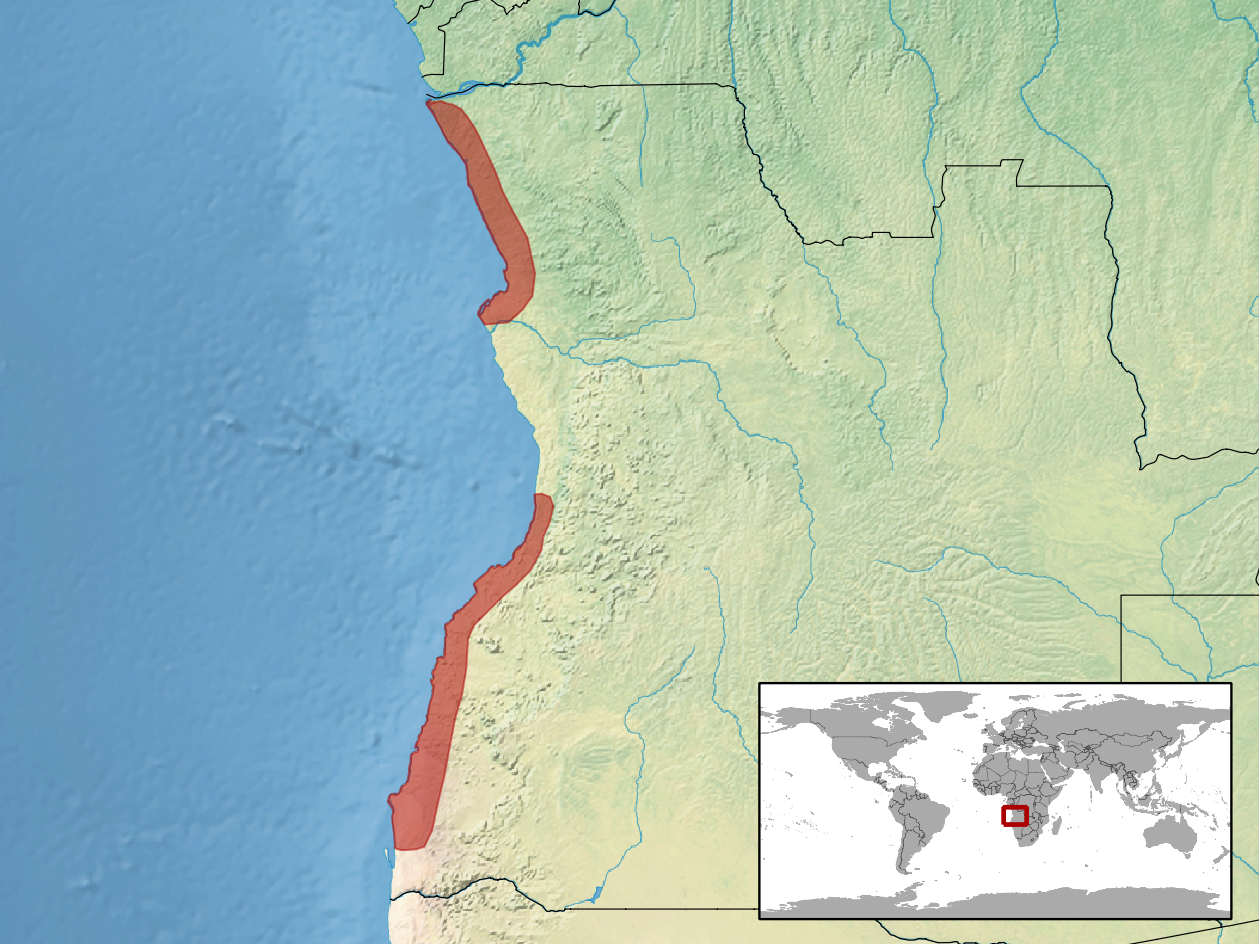

Synonyms
- Vipera Peringueyi Boulenger, 1888; Bitis peringueyi — Boulenger, 1896; Bitis peringueyi — Golay et al., 1993

= Bitis peringueyi =

Species of snake

Bitis peringueyi, also known commonly as Peringuey's adder, Peringuey's desert adder, and the desert sidewinding adder, is a species of venomous snake in the subfamily Viperinae of the family Viperidae. The species is native to Namibia and southern Angola. There are no subspecies that are recognized as being valid.

== Description ==
Bitis peringueyi is a small snake with an average total length (tail included) of 20–25 cm (8–10 in), its maximum recorded total length is 32 cm (13 in).

The head is short and flat with eyes located on top of the head. The head is covered with strongly keeled scales, the smallest of which are located anteriorly. The eyes are separated by 6–9 scales, while each eye is surrounded by 10–13 scales. 2–4 scales separate the suborbitals from the supralabials. The latter number 10–14, and the sublabials number 10–13. The one pair of chin shields contact the first 2–4 sublabials.

The dorsal scales are in 23–31 rows at midbody and 21–27 rows anteriorly. All are strongly keeled, except those bordering the ventral scales are large and smooth. The ventrals number 117–144. The 15–30 subcaudals are usually keeled, particularly towards the tip. The anal plate is single.

The color pattern consists of a pale buff, chestnut brown to orange-brown, or sandy-grayish ground color, overlaid with three longitudinal series of faint, elongate, gray to dark spots. The body is also stippled with an irregular pattern of pale and dark spots. The belly is usually whitish or dirty yellow. The tail is generally tan, but in 25% of specimens, it is black.

== Common names ==
Common names for Bitis peringueyi include Peringuey's adder, Peringuey's desert adder, sidewinding adder, Namib dwarf sand adder, dwarf puff adder, Namib desert sidewinding adder, dwarf sand adder, Namib dwarf adder, and Namib desert viper.

== Etymology ==
This adder, Bitis peringueyi, was named after Louis Péringuey, a South African entomologist and museum director.

== Geographic range ==
Bitis peringueyi is found in the Namib desert, from southern Angola to Lüderitz, Namibia. It is also seen in Fish River Canyon, and in areas of the Sahara desert, wher it tends to live near sand dunes.

The type locality is given as "Damaraland, 10 miles east of Walfisch Bay" [Namibia].

== Behavior ==
An ambush hunter, Bitis peringueyi buries itself just beneath the surface of the sand with only its eyes and the tip of its tail exposed. Its skull represents a sharp shape to cut through the sand. Its skull is sharp to penetrate the sand around it. Individuals with black tail-tips employ caudal luring. When prey happens by, it is seized and envenomated.

== Feeding ==
The diet of Bitis peringueyi includes lizards of the genera Meroles (desert lizards) and Ptenopus (barking geckos). Meroles lizards have a high water content and are an important source of water for this snake.
