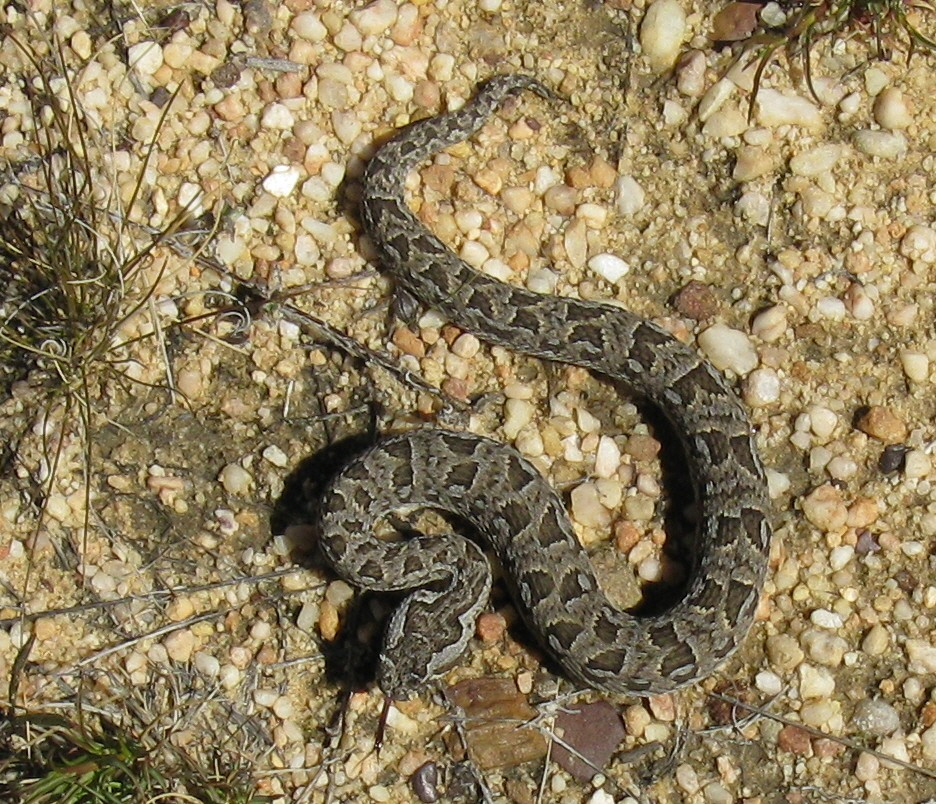
- Color variant typical of the Cedarberg, about 32.33° South, 19.1° East.

Conservation status
- Least Concern (IUCN 3.1)

Scientific classification
- Kingdom: Animalia
- Phylum: Chordata
- Class: Reptilia
- Order: Squamata
- Suborder: Serpentes
- Family: Viperidae
- Genus: Bitis
- Species: B. atropos

Binomial name
- Bitis atropos (Linnaeus, 1758)
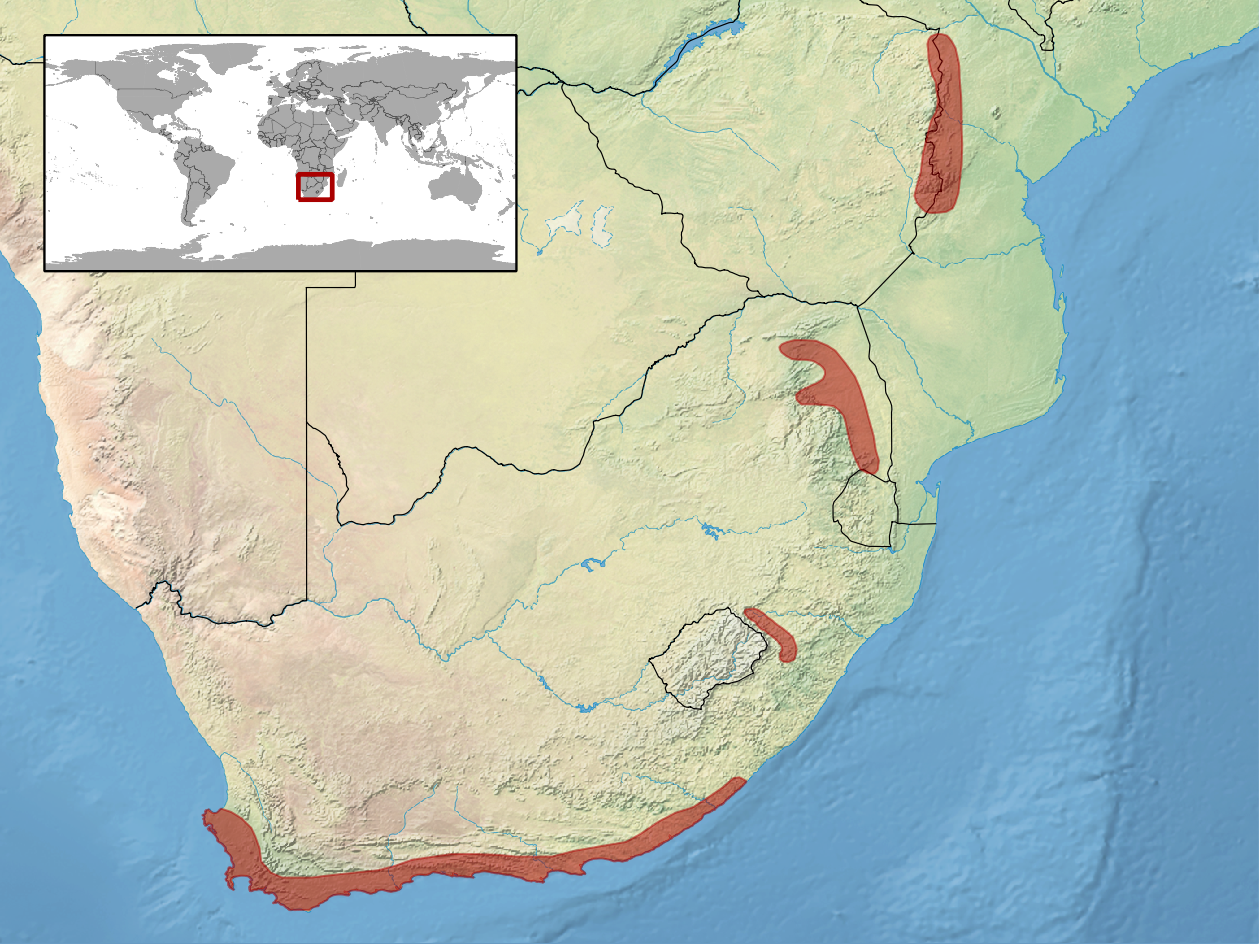

Synonyms
- Coluber atropos Linnaeus, 1754; [Coluber] Atropos Linnaeus, 1758; Cobra Atropos — Laurenti, 1768; Vipera Atropos — Sonnini & Latreille, 1801; [Vipera (Echidna)] Atropos — Merrem, 1820; Vipera montana A. Smith, 1826; [Echidna] Atropos — Wagler, 1830; Clotho [(Bitis)] Atropos — Gray, 1842; E[chidna]. ocellata Tschudi, 1845; Calechidna ocellata — Tschudi, 1845; Edchidna atropos — A.M.C. Duméril, Bibron & A.H.A. Duméril, 1854; Bitis atropos — Günther, 1858; V[ipera]. (Echidna) atropos — Jan, 1863; Bitis atropos — Boulenger, 1896; [Bitis atropos] atropos — V. FitzSimons, 1959; Bitis atropos unicolor V. FitzSimons, 1959; Bitis atropos atropos — Broadley, 1962; Bitis atropos — Carpenter & Ferguson, 1977; Bitis atropos — Broadley, 1983; Viper atropos — Golay et al., 1993; Bitis atropos — Golay et al., 1993

= Berg adder =

Species of snake

The berg adder (Bitis atropos) is a viper species endemic to mountainous regions in southern Africa. No subspecies are currently recognized.

== Taxonomy ==
The specific name, atropos, refers to the Greek mythological goddess Atropos, who was one of the Three Fates, the one who cut the thread of life. The type locality given is "America", but this is obviously a mistake. More likely, it is the Cape of Good Hope, according to FitzSimons (1962).

Its common names include berg adder, Cape mountain adder, and mountain adder.

== Description ==
The typical adult size of B. atropos is 30–40 cm (about 12–16 in) in total length (body and tail), with some females reaching a maximum total length of 50 cm (20 in) in the wild and 60 cm (24 in) in captivity.

== Distribution and habitat ==
B. atropos is found in isolated populations of the mountainous regions of southern Africa. In South Africa, the species is known to occur in the Transvaal, along the Drakensberg escarpment of the eastern and northern Transvaal. Elsewhere in South Africa, it occurs in western Natal, Lesotho, and eastern Free State, and in the southern coastal mountains of western and eastern Cape Province. Spawls and Branch (1995) also mentioned, in Cape Province, its range extends into the Cape Peninsula. It also occurs in Eswatini, in higher altitudes of eastern Zimbabwe such as the Inyanga Highlands and Chimanimani Mountains, and in nearby Mozambique.

B. atropos occupies a number of different habitats, but prefers relatively cool environments with high levels of precipitation. In the northern part of its range, where the winters are cold and dry and the summers warm and wet, it is restricted to higher elevations, up to 3,000 m (9,800 ft). In Zimbabwe, it is not found below 1,500 m (4,900 ft), usually associated with mountain slopes and rocky hillsides, but also montane grassland with patches of bushes and shrubs.

In the southern part of its range (Cape Province, South Africa), where the winters are cold and wet and the summers warm and dry, it can be found in coastal and mountain heathland, as well as small rock outcrops at sea level and grassy areas with clumps of bushes and shrubs west of the Cape Peninsula.

== Venom and diet ==
The atropos adder is unusual among Bitis species in that its venom is predominantly neurotoxic, so much so that the effects of the bite seldom include necrosis or infection. The snake is described as "irascible", hissing violently and twisting convulsively if molested.

Presumably, the neurotoxic venom is an adaptation to the prey, which largely comprise rock lizards and small amphibians. It does, however, also eat other animals, such as small rodents and young of ground-nesting birds. The venom is not powerful enough for the dose injected at a single strike to kill an adult human, and no records of human fatalities have been found. Whether at threat or not, though, persons do not seem to respond usefully to antivenom, so treatment should be limited to symptomatic control. Such as the effects of the venom are, they take effect quickly. Symptoms of the bite have been compared to alcohol intoxication and are not permanent. Unlike the bites of elapid snakes, B. atropos bites, though neurotoxic, do not cause obvious effects on heart and respiratory functions, but they can be troublesome, and their effects sometimes persist for some days or even weeks, which suggests the venom causes nerve damage that does not mend quickly if it is severe. Obvious symptoms may include loss of smell or taste, drooping eyelids, and loss of vision.

== Reproduction ==
B. atropos is viviparous. Young are born in late summer. Average litter size is seven, but may be as many as 15. Each neonate has a total length (including tail) of about 13 cm (5.1 in).

- Boulenger GA (1896). Catalogue of the Snakes in the British Museum (Natural History). Volume III., Containing the ... Viperidæ. London: Trustees of the British Museum (Natural History). (Taylor and Francis, printers.) xiv + 727 pp. + Plates I.- XXV. (Bitis atropos, pp. 495–496).
- Branch, Bill (2004). Field Guide to Snakes and Other Reptiles of Southern Africa. Third Revised edition, Second impression. Sanibel Island, Florida: Ralph Curtis Books. 399 pp. ISBN 0-88359-042-5. (Bitis atropos, pp. 115–116 + Plate 12).
- Broadley DG, Cock EV (1975). Snakes of Rhodesia. Zimbabwe: Longman Zimbabwe Ltd. 97 pp.
- Broadley DG (1990). FitzSimons' Snakes of Southern Africa. Parklands (South Africa): J. Ball & A.D. Donker Publishers. 387 pp.
- Duméril A-M-C, Bibron G, Duméril A (1854). Erpétologie générale ou histoire naturelle complète des reptiles. Tome septième. Deuxième partie. Paris: Roret. xii + pp. 781–1536. (Echidna atropos, pp. 1432–1433).
- FitzSimons VFM (1962). Snakes of Southern Africa. Cape Town and Johannesburg: Purnell and Sons (S.A.) (Pty.) Ltd. 423 pp.
- FitzSimons VFM (1980). A Field Guide to the Snakes of Southern Africa. London: Collins Publishers. 221 pp.
- Linnaeus C (1758). Systema naturæ per regna tria naturæ, secundum classes, ordines, genera, species, cum characteribus, differentiis, synonymis, locis. Tomus I. Editio Decima, Reformata. Stockholm: L. Salvius. 824 pp. (Coluber atropos, p. 216).
