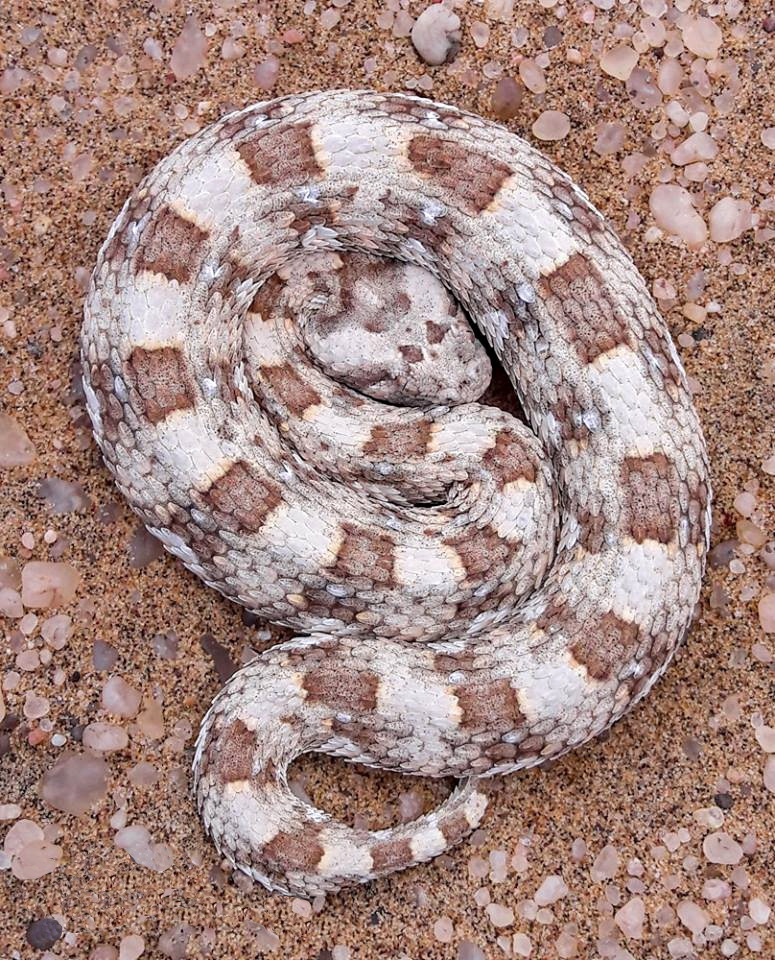

Conservation status
- Least Concern (IUCN 3.1)

Scientific classification
- Kingdom: Animalia
- Phylum: Chordata
- Class: Reptilia
- Order: Squamata
- Suborder: Serpentes
- Family: Viperidae
- Genus: Bitis
- Species: B. caudalis

Binomial name
- Bitis caudalis (A. Smith, 1839)

Synonyms
- Vipera ocellata A. Smith, 1838; Cerastes ocellatus — A. Smith, 1838; Vipera caudalis A. Smith, 1839; Vipera (Cerastes) caudalis — A. Smith, 1839; Cerastes caudalis — Gray, 1842; Vipera caudalis — Jan, 1859; V[ipera]. (Cerastes) caudalis — Jan, 1863; Bitis caudalis — Boulenger, 1896; Cobra caudalis — Mertens, 1937; Bitis caudalis caudalis — Mertens, 1955; Bitis caudalis — Branch, 1991

= Horned adder =

Species of snake

The horned adder (Bitis caudalis) is a viper species. It is found in the arid region of southwest Africa, in Angola, Botswana, Namibia; South Africa, and Zimbabwe. It is easily distinguished by the presence of a single, large horn-like scale over each eye. No subspecies are currently recognized. Like all other vipers, it is venomous.

== Common names ==
The species is commonly known as the horned adder, horned puff adder, or horned viper.

== Description ==
A short, stout little viper, it usually averages 30–40 cm (12–15.5 in) in total length (body + tail). The largest specimen reported being seen is a female from southern Botswana measuring 51.5 cm (20.3 in) total length.

== Geographic range ==
The snake is found in far arid regions of southwest Africa: southwest Angola, Namibia, across the Kalahari Desert of southern Botswana, into northern Transvaal and southwestern Zimbabwe. In South Africa, it is found from the Northern Cape province south to the Great Karoo.

Its type locality is given as "... the sandy districts north of the Cape Colony..." [South Africa].

== Habitat ==
Horned adders are mostly found in sparsely vegetated desert and semiarid scrub country.

== Venom ==
Bites are assumed to be rare and no epidemiological data is available. Little information is available regarding the toxicity and amount of venom produced. Spawls and Branch (1995) reported an average yield of 85 mg of wet venom, while Christensen (1971) offered an LD_{50} value of 1.2 mg/kg IV. Other research has found the LD_{50} to be between 0.15 and 0.22 mg/kg

Based on this LD_{50} value, Spawls and Branch (1995) estimated about 300 mg of this venom would be required to kill an adult. They regarded this venom as one of the weakest of the genus, although the tests are conducted solely on mice, which might have a different reaction from humans to the venom. On the other hand, an older report by the U.S. Navy (1965, 1991) suggested it is highly toxic and a number of deaths have occurred as a result. According to Broadley and Cock (1975), envenomation symptoms in humans include swelling, severe pain, nausea, vomiting and shock. Blisters and necrotic ulcers may form around the bite site.

The National Antivenom and Vaccine Production Centre in Riyadh, Saudi Arabia, produces a polyvalent antivenin that includes a paraspecific antibody that protects against bites from this species. According to the U.S. Navy (1965, 1991), polyvalent antivenins produced by SAIMR and the Pasteur Institute are said to be effective, while Mallow et al. (2003) reported currently available antivenins are of limited effectiveness.

Viljoen et al. (1982) isolated a protein, a neurotoxic phospholipase A_{2}, from the venom, which they called "caudoxin". According to Lee et al. (1983), this is a presynaptic toxin similar to bungarotoxin, but with different binding sites.

== Taxonomy ==
A number of authors, including Mertens (1955), use a trinomial to refer to this species, even though no subspecies are recognized.
