= Tail =

Distinct, flexible appendage to the torso of an animal

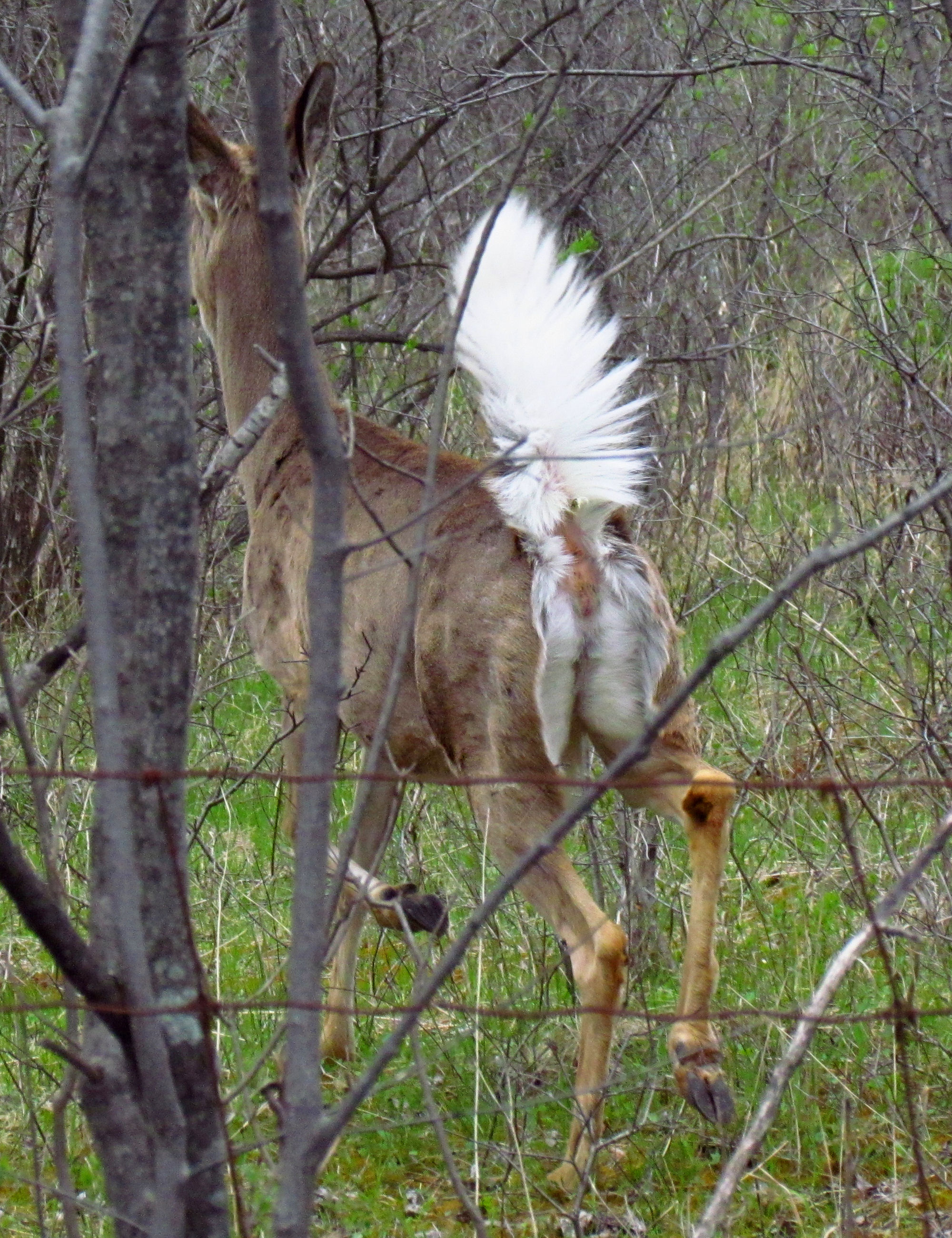
A white-tailed deer's tail

The tail is the elongated section at the rear end of a bilaterian animal's body; in general, the term refers to a distinct, flexible appendage extending backwards from the midline of the torso. In vertebrate animals that evolved to lose their tails (e.g. frogs and hominid primates), the coccyx is the homologous vestigial of the tail. While tails are primarily considered a feature of vertebrates, some invertebrates such as scorpions and springtails, as well as snails and slugs, have tail-like appendages that are also referred to as tails.

Tail-shaped objects are sometimes referred to as "caudate" (e.g. caudate lobe, caudate nucleus), and the body part associated with or proximal to the tail are given the adjective "caudal" (which is considered a more precise anatomical terminology).

== Function ==
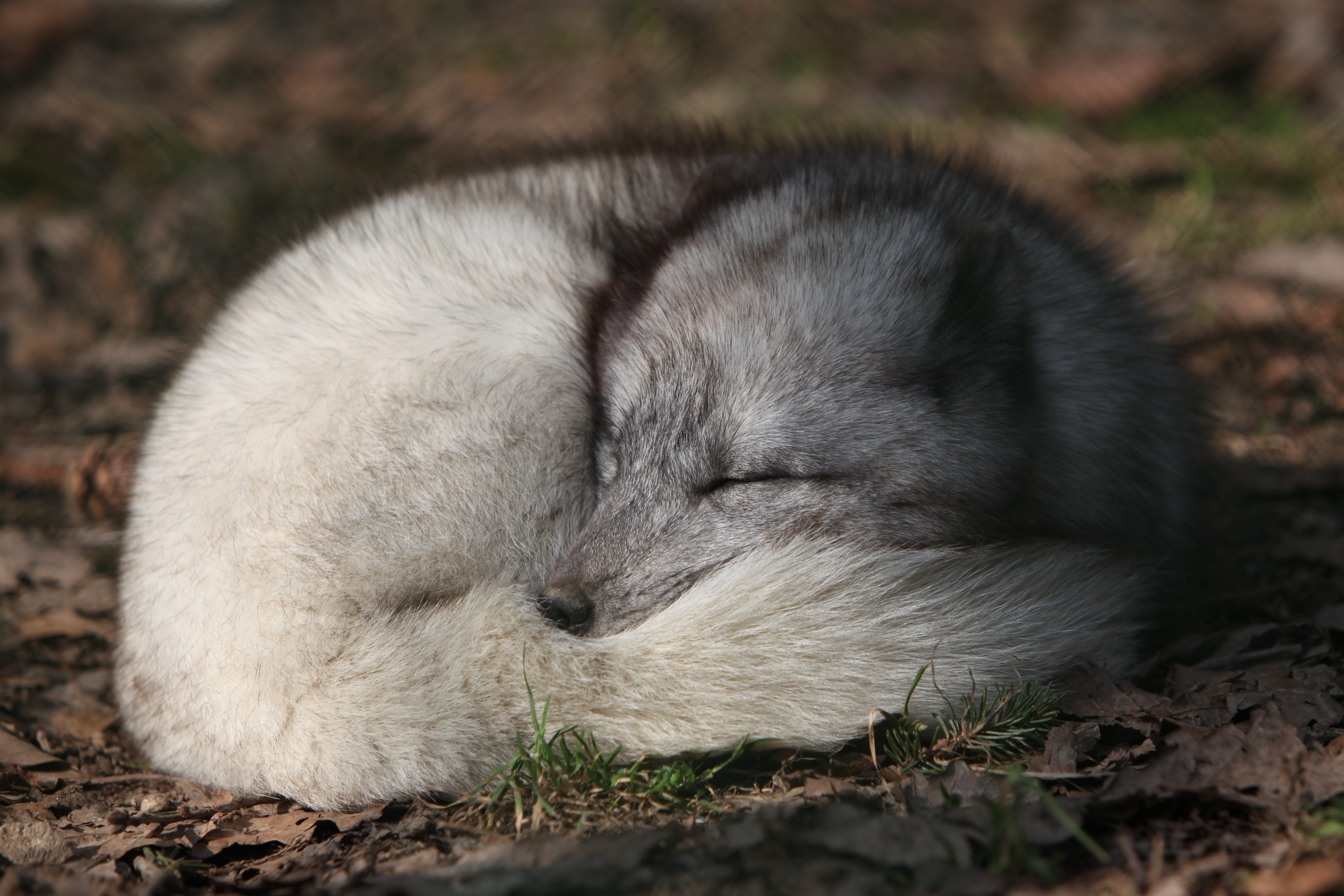
Vulpes lagopus (Arctic fox) sleeping with its tail wrapped as a blanket.

Animal tails are used in a variety of ways. They provide a source of thrust for aquatic locomotion for fish, otters, cetaceans and crocodilians and other forms of marine life. Terrestrial species of vertebrates that do not need to swim, e.g. cats and kangaroos, instead use their tails for balance; and some, such as monkeys and opossums, have grasping prehensile tails, which are adapted for arboreal locomotion.

Many animals use their tail for utility purposes, for example many grazing animals, such as horses and oxen, use their tails to drive away parasitic flies and sweep off other biting insects. Some animals with broad, furry tails (e.g. foxes) often wrap the tail around the body as means of thermal insulation like a blanket.

Some species' tails serve aggressive functions, either predatorily or defensively. For example, the tails of scorpions have a stinger that contain venom, which can be used to either kill large prey or to fight off a threat. Similarly, stingrays have a thickened spine that can deliver penetrating trauma. Thresher sharks are known to use their long tails to stun prey. Many species of snakes wiggle their tails as a lure to attract prey, who may mistake the tail as a worm. The extinct armored dinosaurs (stegosaurs and ankylosaurs) have tails with spikes or clubs as defensive weapons against predators.

Tails are also used for communication and signalling. Most canines use their tails to communicate mood and intention. Some deer species flash the white underside of their tails to warn other nearby deer of possible danger, beavers slap the water with their tails to indicate danger, felids raise and quiver their tails while scent-marking, and canids (including domestic dogs) indicate emotions through the positioning and movement of their tails. Rattlesnakes perform tail vibration to generate a distinct rattling noise that signals aggression and warns potential predators to stay away. Rodents are also capable of tail-rattling and display this behavior in a variety of contexts.

Some species of lizard (e.g. geckos) can self-amputate ("cast") their tails from their bodies to help them escape predators, which are either distracted by the wriggling detached tail or only manages to seize the severed tail while the lizard flees. Tails cast in this manner generally grow back over time, though the replacement is typically darker in colour than the original and contains only cartilage, not bone. Various species of rodents demonstrate a similar function with their tails, known as degloving, in which the outer layer is shed in order for the animal to escape from a predator.

Most birds' tails end in long feathers called rectrices. These feathers are used as a rudder, helping the bird steer and maneuver in flight; they also help the bird to balance while it is perched. In some species—such as birds of paradise, lyrebirds, and most notably peafowl—modified tail feathers play an important role in courtship displays. The extra-stiff tail feathers of other species, including woodpeckers and woodcreepers, allow them to brace themselves firmly against tree trunks.

== Neuronal control ==
Recent work has identified a specialized neural system for controlling the mouse tail during balance-related behavior In mice, motor neurons innervating proximal and distal tail muscles are located in sacral and coccygeal spinal segments, with distal-muscle motor neurons positioned more caudally and having smaller cell bodies than those innervating proximal muscles. These spinal circuits receive descending input from vestibulospinal neurons, especially from the spinal vestibular nucleus (SpVN), which projects to tail-related regions of the sacral spinal cord and can directly contact tail motor neurons. Experimental optogenetic activation of this pathway showed that tail movements were most strongly evoked during challenging balance conditions, such as locomotion on a narrow ridge or during small balance perturbations. These findings suggest that neuronal control of the mouse tail is organized in a context-dependent manner, with vestibulospinal signals helping to recruit tail movements as part of postural stabilization.

== Human tails ==
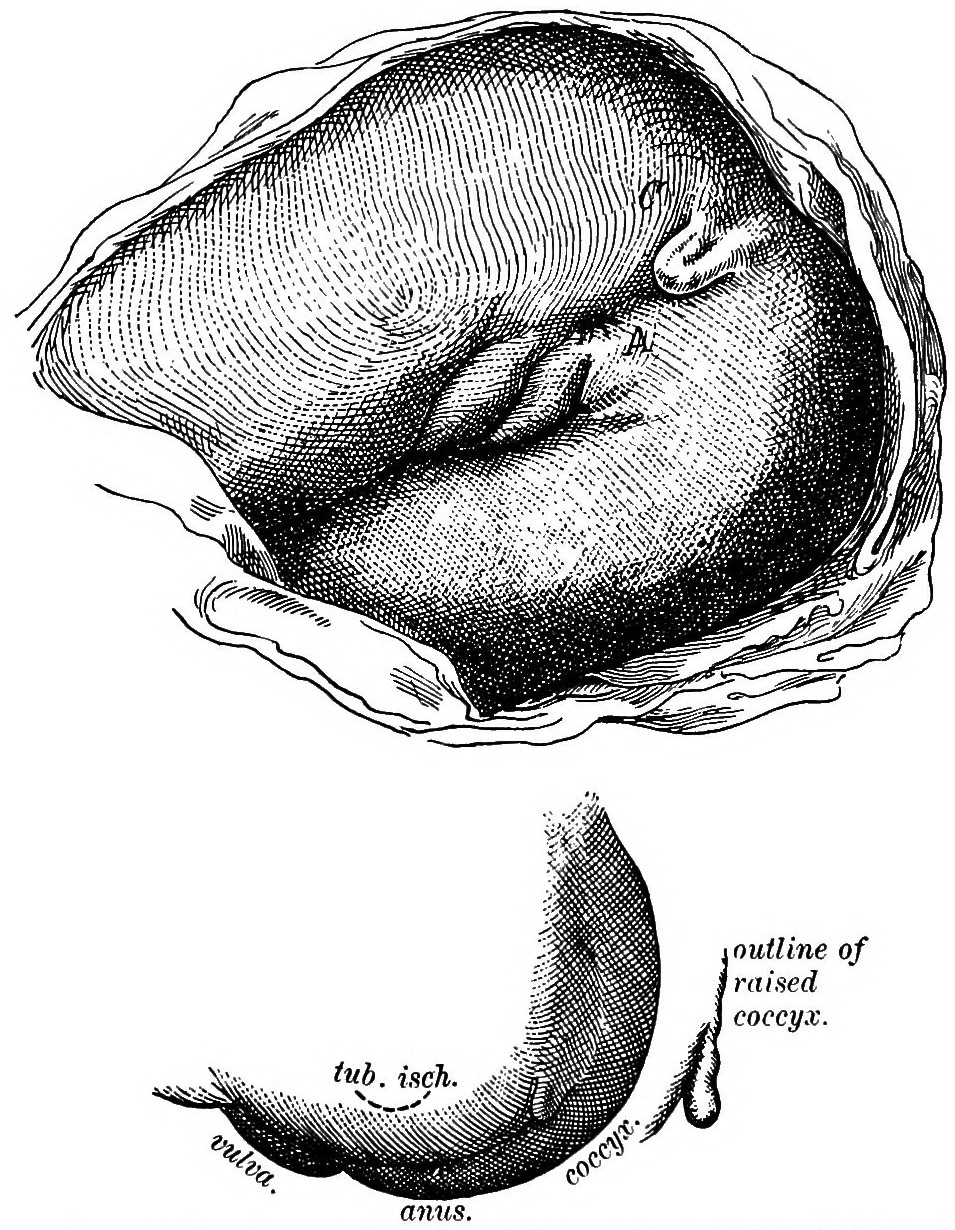
Tail-like structure on a female newborn from coccyx protrusion

In humans, tail bud refers to the part of the embryo which develops into the end of the spine. However, this is not a tail. Infrequently, a child is born with a "soft tail", which contains no vertebrae, but only blood vessels, muscles, and nerves, but this is regarded as an abnormality rather than a vestigial true tail, even when such an appendage is located where the tail would be expected. Fewer than 40 cases have been reported of infants with "true tails" containing the caudal vertebrae, a result of atavism.

In 2024, scientists claimed to have found a genetic mutation that contributed to the loss of the tail in the common ancestor of humans and other apes.

Humans have a "tailbone" (the coccyx) attached to the pelvis; it comprises fused vertebrae, usually four, at the bottom of the vertebral column. It does not normally protrude externally – humans are an acaudal (or acaudate) species (i.e., tailless).

== Gallery ==
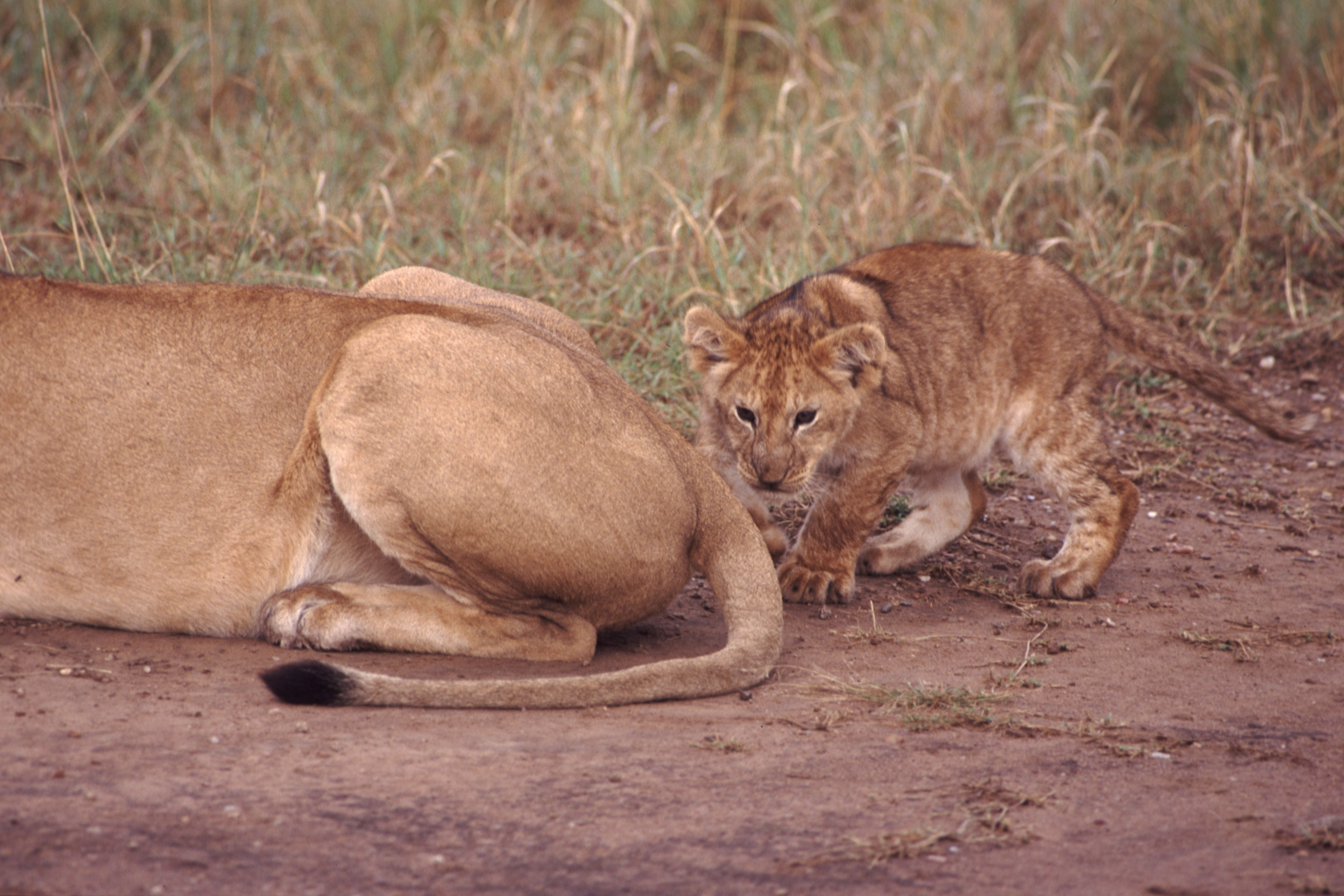
Lion (Panthera leo)

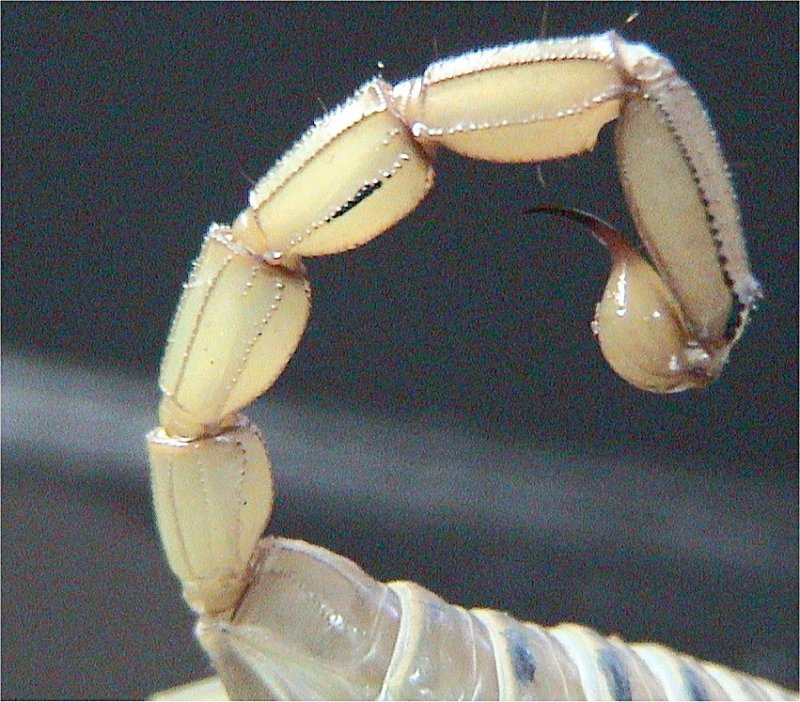
Scorpion

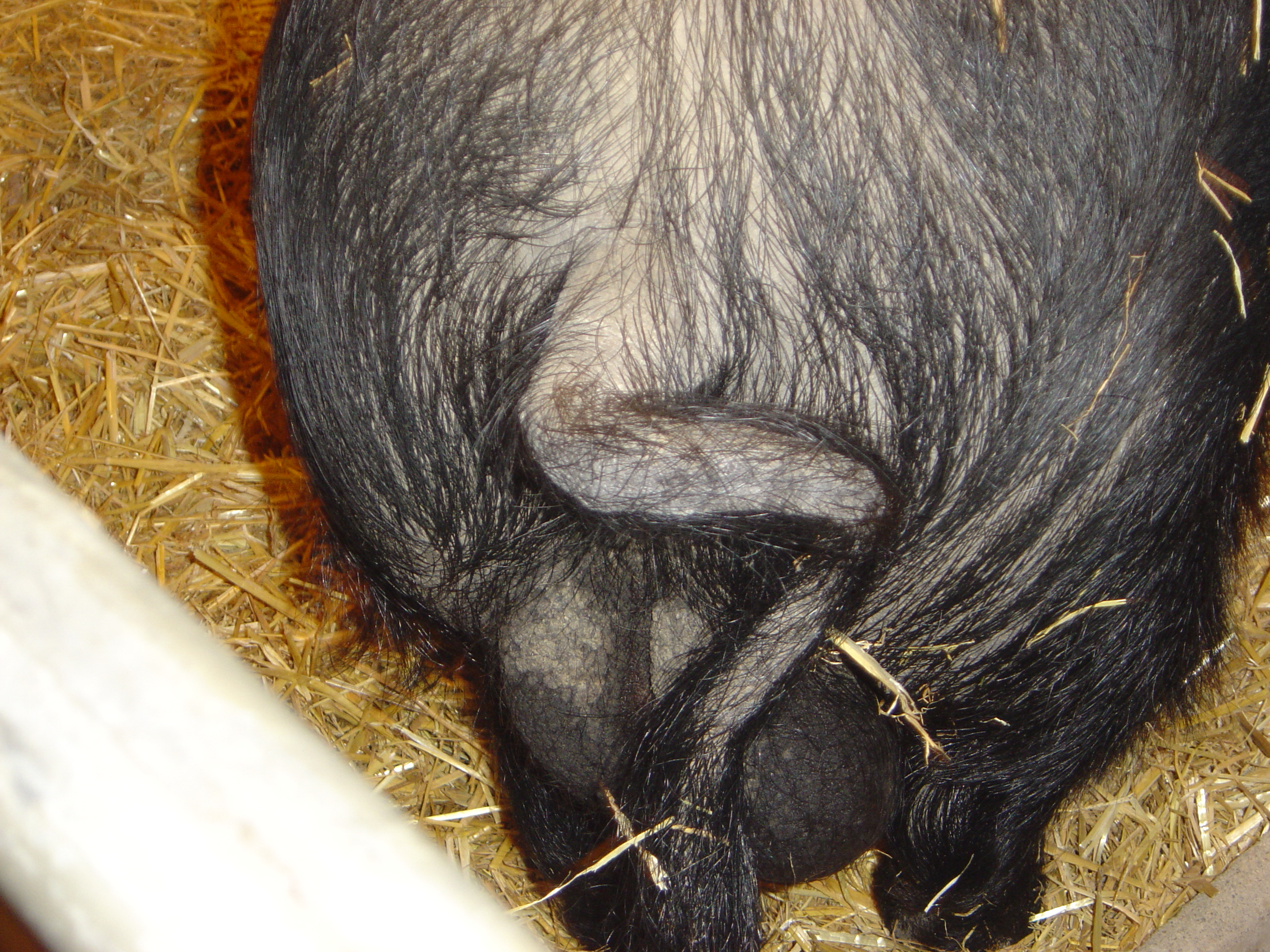
Pig (Sus domestica)

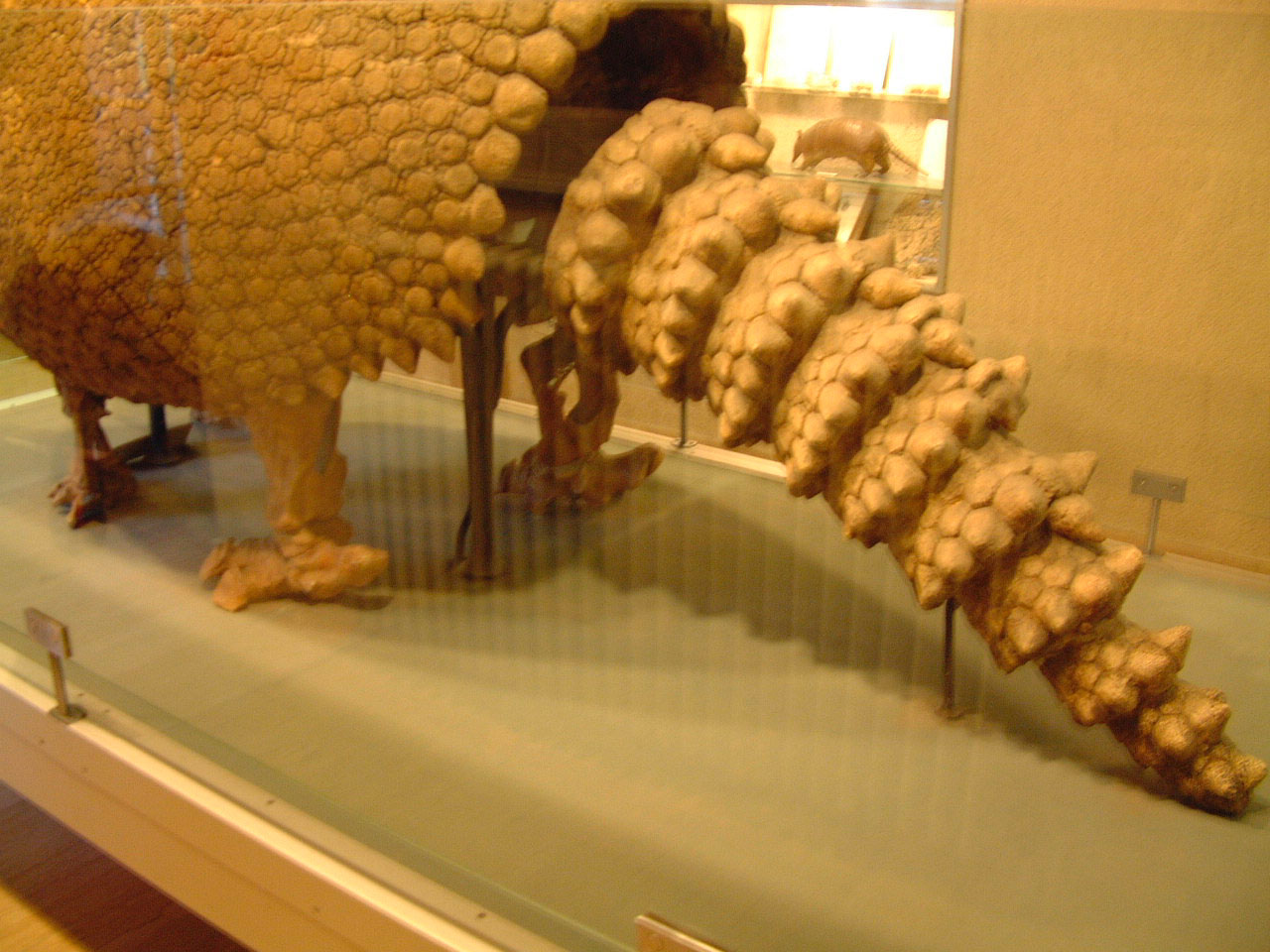
Glyptodon (Glyptodon asper)

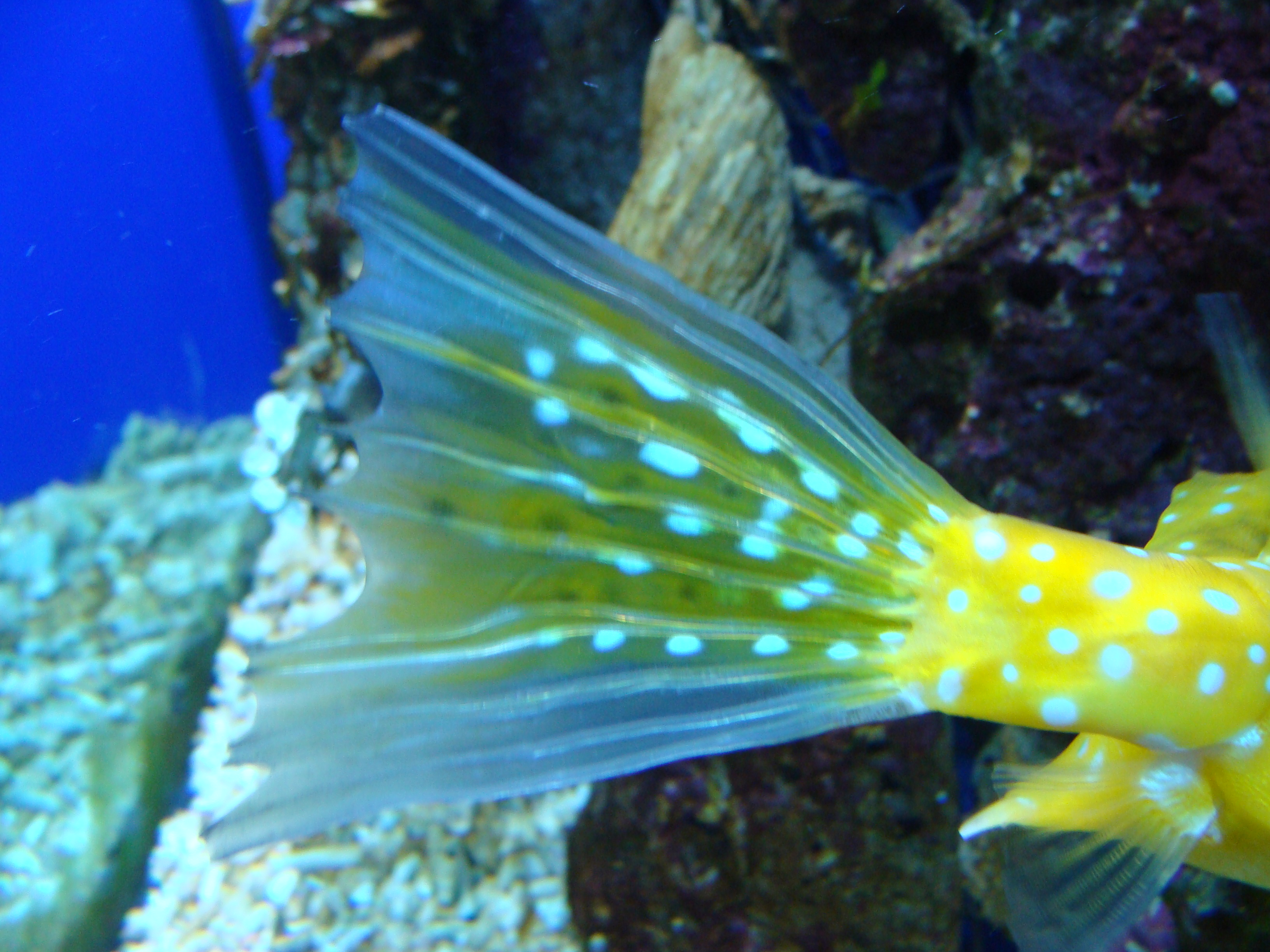
Longhorn cowfish (Lactoria cornuta)

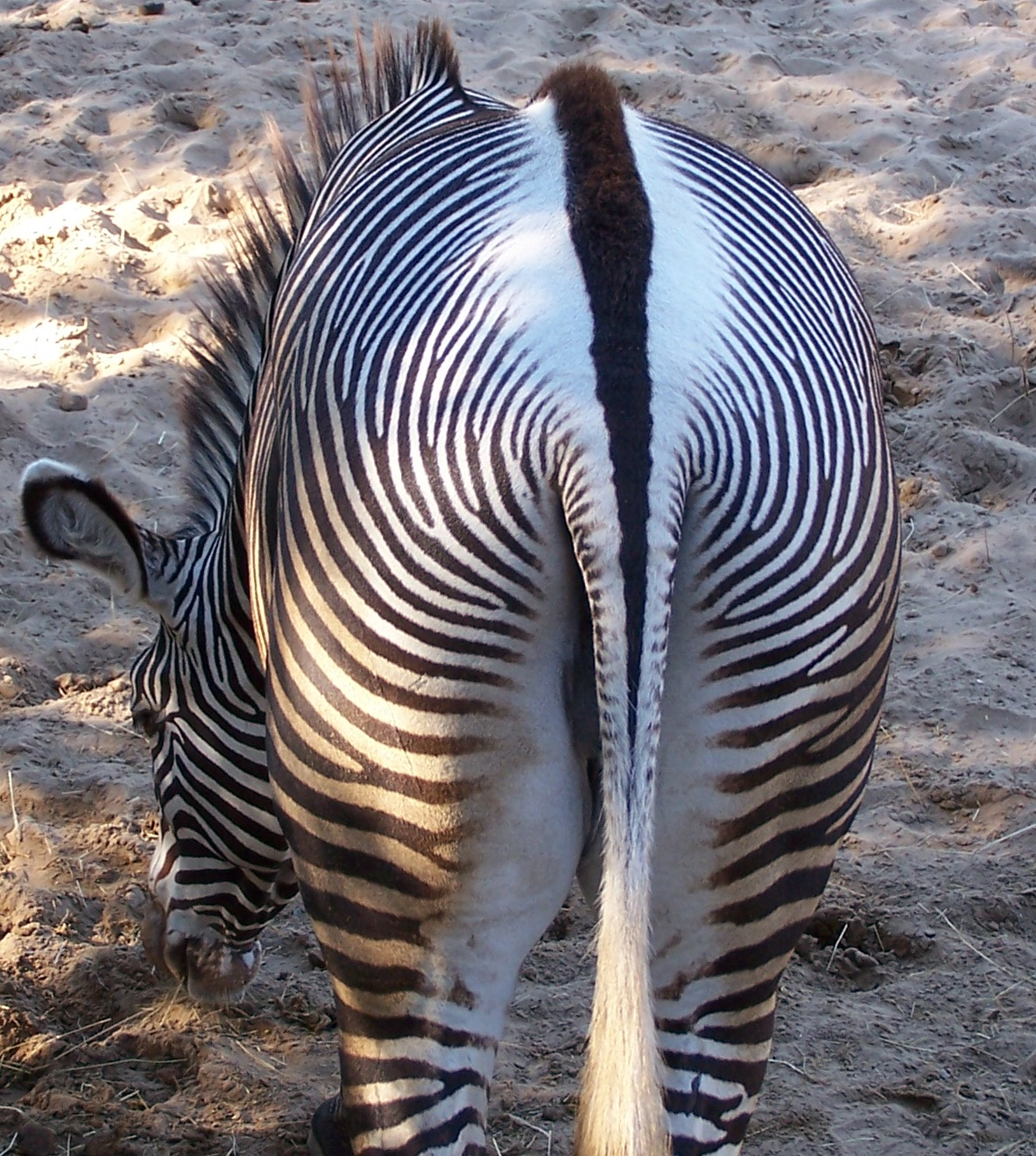
Grévy's zebra (Equus grevyi)

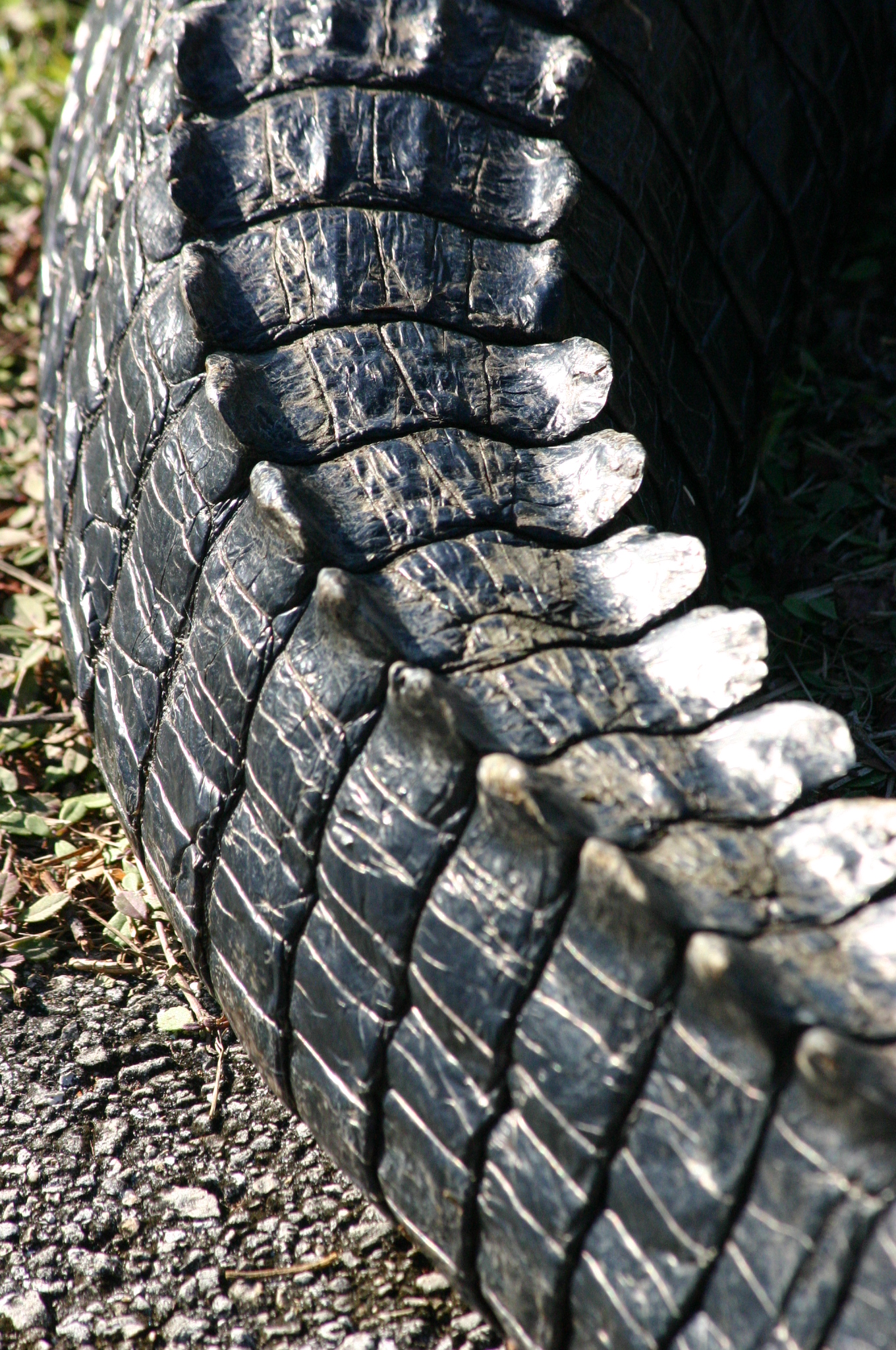
American alligator (Alligator mississipiensis)

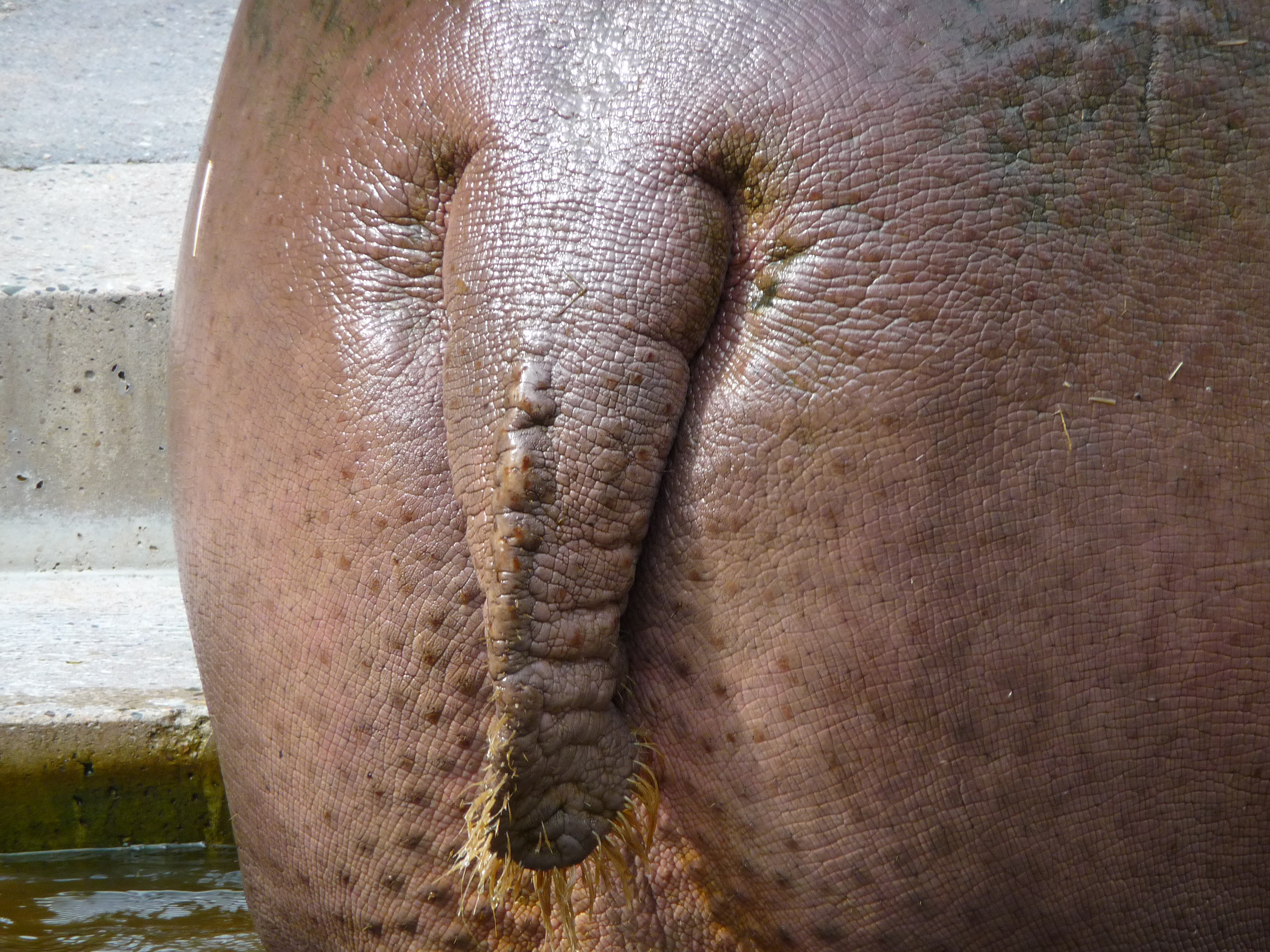
Hippopotamus (Hippopotamus amphibius)

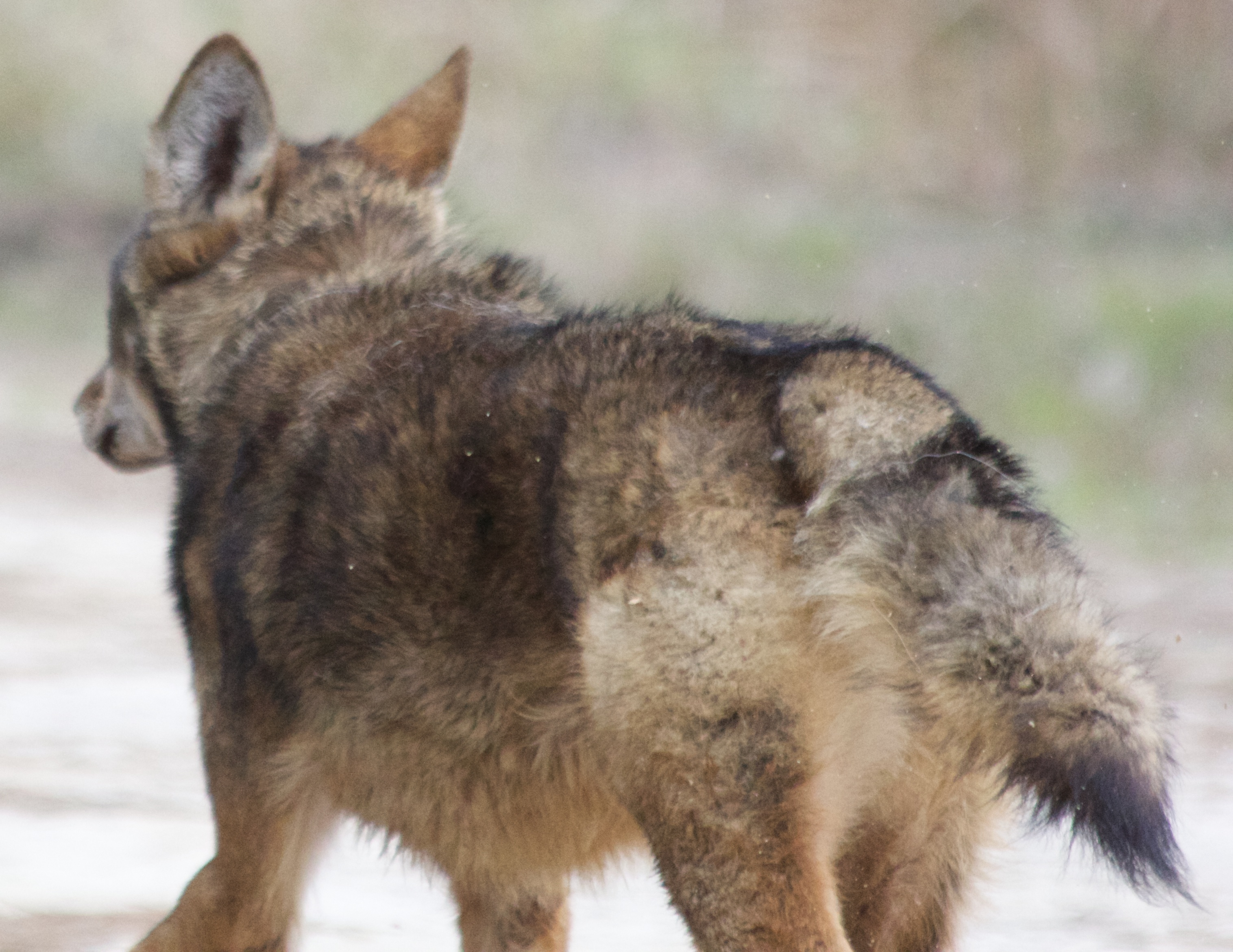
Red wolf (Canis rufus)

== See also ==
- Empennage, the tail of an aircraft
- Rump (animal)
