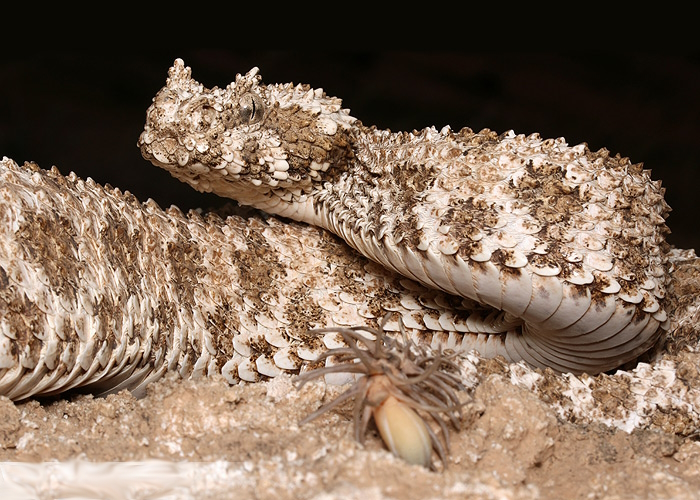
- Close-up of P. urarachnoides showing spider-like tail tip

Conservation status
- Near Threatened (IUCN 3.1)
- CITES Appendix II

Scientific classification
- Kingdom: Animalia
- Phylum: Chordata
- Class: Reptilia
- Order: Squamata
- Suborder: Serpentes
- Family: Viperidae
- Genus: Pseudocerastes
- Species: P. urarachnoides

Binomial name
- Pseudocerastes urarachnoides Bostanchi, S. Anderson, Kami & Papenfuss, 2006
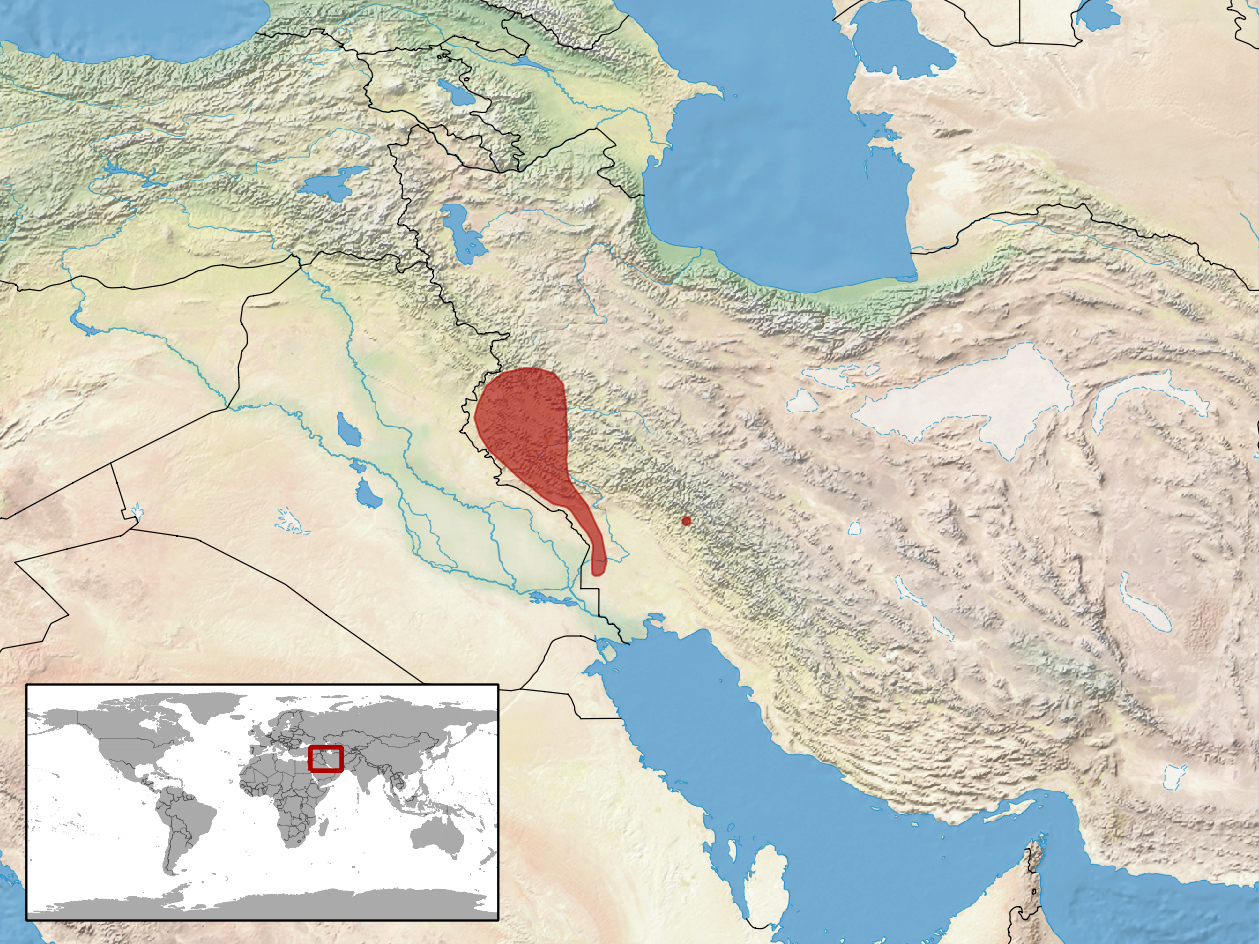

= Spider-tailed horned viper =

Species of venomous snake

The spider-tailed horned viper (Pseudocerastes urarachnoides) is a species of viper, a venomous snake, in the family Viperidae and genus Pseudocerastes. The genus is commonly known as "false-horned vipers". The species is endemic to western Iran and the Iran-Iraq border region.

P. urarachnoides appears very similar to other Pseudocerastes species in the region, especially around the head, but the spider-tailed horned viper has a unique tail with a bulb-like end that is bordered by long drooping scales that give it the appearance of a spider, which is used in aggressive mimicry. A specimen was collected in 1968 and identified as Pseudocerastes persicus, with the unusual tip of the tail being attributed to a parasite, deformity, or tumors. Another specimen was found in 2003, and the species was described in 2006. The tail tip is waved around and used to lure insectivorous birds to within striking range.

== Nomenclature ==
The specific name, urarachnoides, is derived from Ancient Greek (οὐρά + αράχνη + οειδής), and refers to this snake's spider-like tail-tip, as does the common name.

=== Taxonomy ===
Molecular studies based on cytochrome b show it to be closer to the Persian horned viper (Pseudocerastes persicus) than to Field's horned viper (Pseudocerastes fieldi).

== Description ==
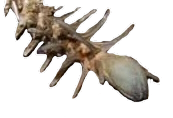
Close-up of the tail

Like other vipers in the genus Pseudocerastes, the scales above the eyes rise up to give P. urarachnoides a horned appearance. A specimen had been collected in 1968 as part of the Second Street Expedition to Iran and deposited in the Field Museum of Natural History at Chicago, identified as Pseudocerastes persicus. It was eventually found to be distinct, and was described as a new species in 2006.

The species is distinguished by a number of characteristics. There are about 16 to 17 scales between the horns, and the scales on the body above are rougher than on other species in the genus. There are 15 pairs of subcaudal scales, and the scales on the sides of the tail are elongated and appear like appendages of an arthropod. The tip of the tail is inflated into a bulb-like shape.

== Distribution and habitat ==
The species is found in the western parts of Iran and over the border into the eastern part of Iraq. It is found in the Zagros Mountains, more commonly on the western side of the mountains. Its current range is relatively small and getting smaller. This species lives in higher elevations that are primarily composed of gypsum, preferring deep cracks and holes within the rock. They use these areas because they trap humidity and moisture during the hot summer months, providing them with a suitable microclimate. During the day, it is most commonly found in the shade of a shrub.

It overlaps in distribution with P. fieldi in Gilan-e Gharb, next to Qasr-e Shirin, Kermanshah, and with P. persicus in Bina and Bijar, Ilam Province.

== Biology ==
=== Mimicry and behavior ===
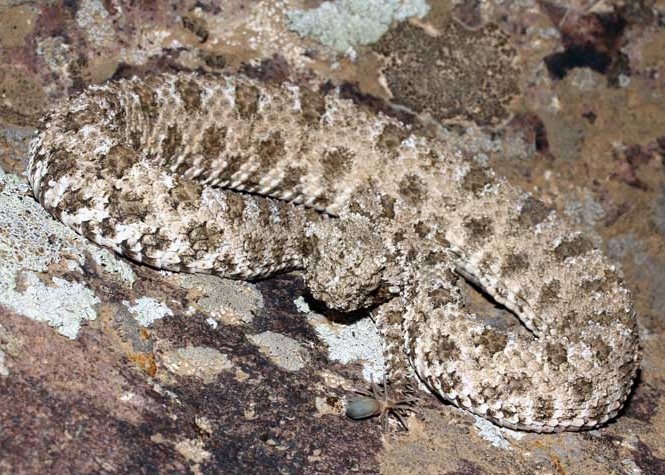
The snake's conspicuous tail contrasts with the rest of its body, which is well-camouflaged with disruptive coloration

Using the tail as a lure to catch a wren-like bird

The snake is a Peckhamian or aggressive mimic; their tails resemble an arachnid, and the authors who described the species speculated that it was used as a lure to attract birds, as a digested lark had been found in the stomach of the paratype specimen. This species has been documented feeding on several bird species such as the Isabelline shrike, and five different warbler species. The actual use of the tail to lure birds has been confirmed in field studies; the tail is moved in a figure-of-eight pattern, and the rate of tail movements increases with the presence of birds. This phenomenon supports the theory that the tail movement is a luring behavior, and not a random one.

The tip of the tail is used as a caudal lure in several other species of snake, including the horned adder (Bitis caudalis), sidewinder (Crotalus cerastes), eastern massasauga (Sistrurus catenatus), eastern copperhead (Agkistrodon contortrix), common death-adder (Acanthophis antarcticus), northern death-adder (Acanthophis praelongus), and green tree python (Morelia viridis), but none of these examples has the unique elongated scales that give it the appearance of arthropod appendages.

Footage of spider-tailed horned vipers using their tails to lure migrating birds is featured in the Asia episode of the BBC series Seven Worlds, One Planet narrated by David Attenborough.

=== Fangs ===
Pseudocerastes urarachnoides has solenoglyphous fangs, like all other species of the family Viperidae.

=== Venom ===
The venom of Pseudocerastes urarachnoides mainly acts as a cytotoxin. It targets cells and destroys them. Unlike its sister species, this cytotoxin destroys a wide variety of cell types. It has minor neurotoxic effects. This venom works as a procoagulant, with a remarkable coagulation speed, with reports of about 13 seconds before coagulation. Compared to its sister species, this venom is highly-specialized for birds. The venoms of the sister species, P. fieldi and P. persicus, do not have significant effects on birds and are more suited for mammals and amphibians. P. urarachnoides has a significant effect on birds, mammals, and amphibians. There is speculation that the venom affecting amphibians, toads specifically, could be a sign that these are the main diet of the young snakes. In a study by Brouw (2021), it was found that the venom of this species does have a coagulant effect on humans and affects the human's Factor X. However, there has never been a recorded case of human envenomation in the wild. The severity of the effects that this venom would have on humans is not known.
