= Kimberley death adder =

Conservation status
- Vulnerable (IUCN 3.1)

Scientific classification
- Kingdom: Animalia
- Phylum: Chordata
- Order: Squamata
- Suborder: Serpentes
- Family: Elapidae
- Genus: Acanthophis
- Species: A. cryptamydros

Binomial name
- Acanthophis cryptamydros Maddock, Ellis, Doughty, Smith & Wüster, 2015

Synonyms
- Acanthophis lancasteri Wells & Wellington, 1985

Species of snake

The Kimberley death adder (Acanthophis cryptamydros) is a species of venomous snake in the family Elapidae native to northwestern Australia.

Richard Wells and Ross Wellington gave the Kimberley death adder its scientific name Acanthophis lancasteri—in honour of Burt Lancaster—in a 1985 monograph, citing as the type specimen an adult collected 45 kilometres (28 mi) north-northeast of Halls Creek in Western Australia. They cited a 1981 paper by Glen Milton Storr, who had written about death adders of Western Australia. Storr considered both Kimberley and Cape York populations as northern death adder (A. praelongus), and Wells and Wellington noted the description was restricted to the Kimberley population and renamed it as a new species. The monograph was criticised for new species having no or minimal descriptions. Ken P. Aplin and Steve C. Donnellan incorrectly called the name a nomen nudum believing neither Wells and Wellington's nor Storr's notes distinguished the new taxon from the northern death adder, but overlooking the purported differentiating characters with W&W.

Simon Maddock and colleagues analysed the Kimberley death adder genetically and confirmed W&W 30 year prior contentions that it was a distinct lineage, more closely related to the desert death adder (A. pyrrhus), and named it Acanthophis cryptamydros in 2015, as they proposed that A. lancasteri was a nomen nudum. Wellington countered that their 1985 name was in fact valid.

Australian official sources recognise lancasteri, whereas Integrated Taxonomic Information System (ITIS) controlled by a group of biased non code compliant academics recognises cryptamydros as the valid name.

The Kimberley death adder is a stocky snake with a pear-shaped head that reaches 64.5 cm (25.5 in) in length. It is a light orange-brown on its back and sides, with darker brown cross-bands, each of which has darker margins. It has distinctive creamy white underparts. It can be distinguished from other Australian death adders by the numbers of scales: 22 or 23 rows of midbody scales, 125–139 ventrals, undivided prefrontal scales, and the rear edge of its frontal scale not extending beyond rear edge of supraoculars, supraoculars flared laterally, area of lower secondary temporal scale equal to or smaller than sixth supralabial, anterior dorsal scales with prominent keels.

It is found from Wotjulum to Kununurra in northwestern Australia.
