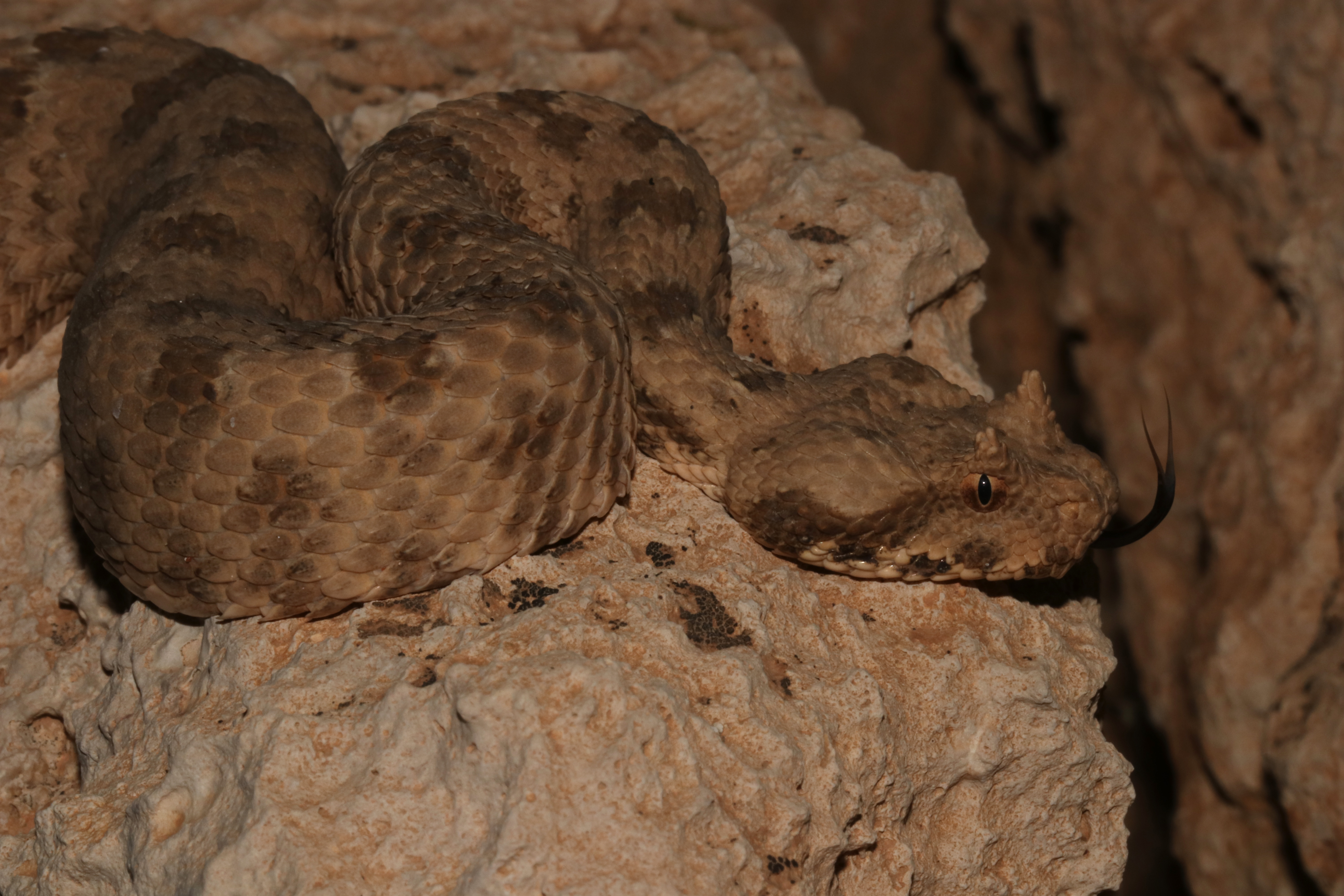
- Wild Pseudocerastes fieldi from Rafha in northern Saudi Arabia.

Conservation status
- Least Concern (IUCN 3.1)

Scientific classification
- Kingdom: Animalia
- Phylum: Chordata
- Class: Reptilia
- Order: Squamata
- Suborder: Serpentes
- Family: Viperidae
- Genus: Pseudocerastes
- Species: P. fieldi

Binomial name
- Pseudocerastes fieldi K.P. Schmidt, 1930
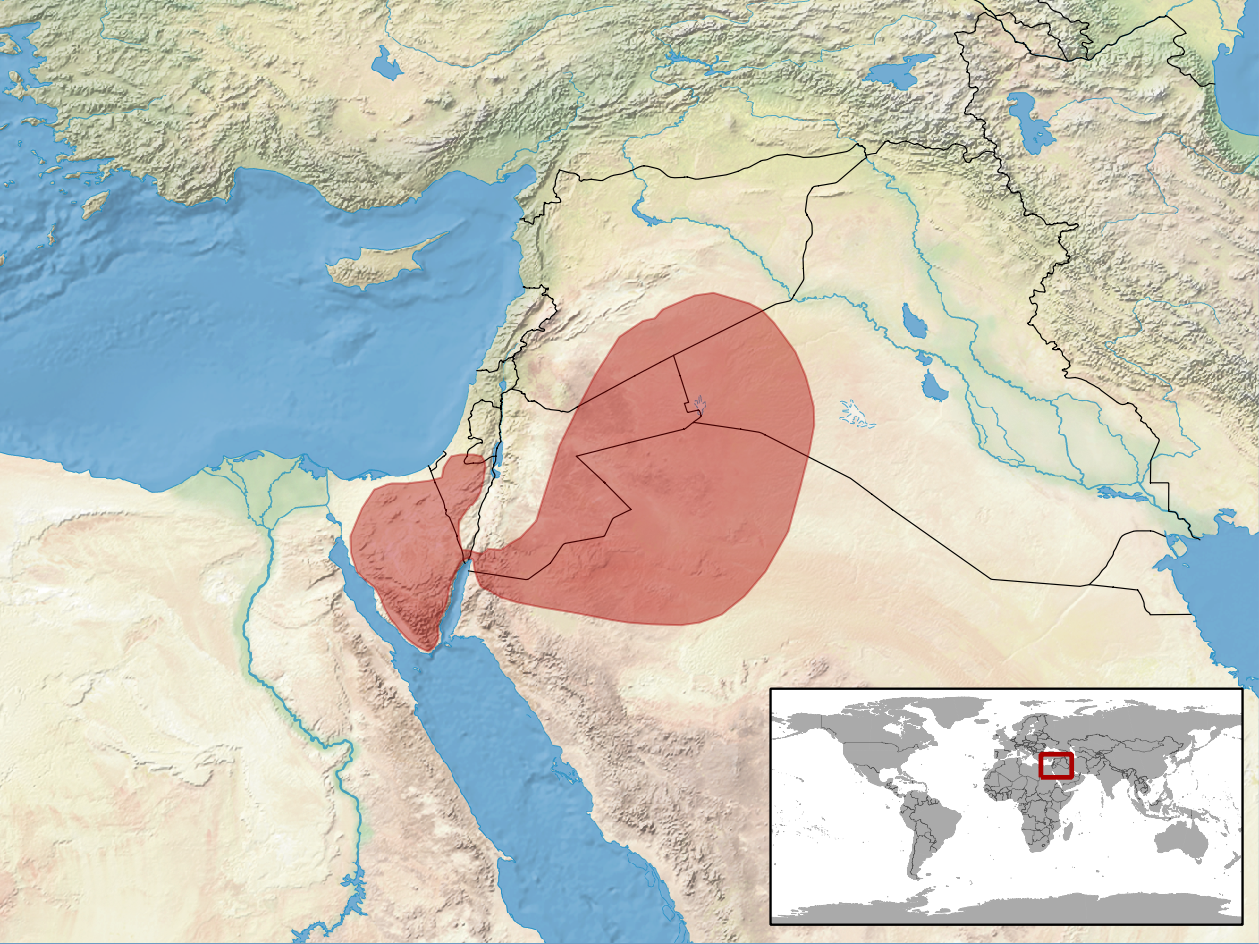

Synonyms
- Pseudocerastes fieldi K.P. Schmidt, 1930; Vipera persica fieldi — Marx & Rabb, 1965; Pseudocerastes persicus fieldi — Minton, Dowling & Russell, 1968; Daboia (Pseudocerastes) persicus fieldi — Obst, 1983; Pseudocerastes fieldi — Wallach et al., 2014

= Field's horned viper =

Species of snake

Field's horned viper (Pseudocerastes fieldi) is a species of snake in the family Viperidae. The species is native to the deserts of the Middle East. Like all other vipers, it is venomous. It was previously considered a subspecies of the Persian horned viper (Pseudocerastes persicus). The main differences between this species and the Persian horned viper are in scalation and venom composition.

== Taxonomy and etymology ==
Formerly considered a subspecies of P. persicus, most sources elevate P. fieldi to species level. The first phylogenetic study of the genus Pseudocerastes, published by Fathinia et al. in 2014, shows that P. fieldi has equal genetic distance from both P. persicus and another species of the same genus, P. urarachnoides.

The specific epithet fieldi is in honor of American anthropologist Henry Field, who collected the holotype. The Field Museum of Natural History in Chicago and its scientific publication, Fieldiana, in which K.P. Schmidt's original description of this viper appeared, are named for Henry Field's grandfather, Marshall Field.

== Description ==
Outwardly, Field's horned viper differs from the Persian horned viper (Pseudocerastes persicus) in certain (lower) scale counts:

	P. fieldi	P. persicus
Scales separating nasal and rostral	1	2
Dorsal scale rows at midbody	21–23	23–25
Ventral scales	127–142	144–158
Subcaudal scales	34–46	38–48

Additional differences from the Persian horned viper include much shorter (relatively to the overall body length) tail as well as the fact that while in P. persicus all dorsal and lateral scales are strongly keeled, P. fieldi has several rows of almost smooth lateral scales.

== Geographic distribution ==
According to McDiarmid et al. (1999) P. fieldi is found in the Sinai Peninsula, Israel, Jordan, northern Saudi Arabia, northwestern Iraq, and possibly in southern Syria.

The type locality given in the original description is "Bair Wells, Transjordania" [Jordan].

According to Mallow et al. (2003) it is found in the Sinai Peninsula, southern Israel, Jordan, extreme northern Saudi Arabia, and southwestern Iraq.

== Habitat ==
The preferred natural habitats of P. fieldi are desert and shrubland, at altitudes up to 1,300 m (4,300 ft). It has also been found in agricultural areas, but not in or around houses.

== Reproduction ==
P. fieldi is oviparous.

== Venom ==
There is a more pronounced difference between the two species, P. fieldi and P. persicus, with regard to their venom. While Persian horned viper venom exhibits strong hemorrhagic activity typical of most vipers, the venom of P. fieldi is unusual in that it contains several fractions that show marked neurotoxic activity. No antivenin is available for bites from either species. It is reported that a polyvalent antiserum does offer some protection from the hemotoxins, but none against the neurotoxic effects of P. fieldi venom.
