= Coolgardie bioregion =

Bioregion in Western Australia

Coolgardie
- Region
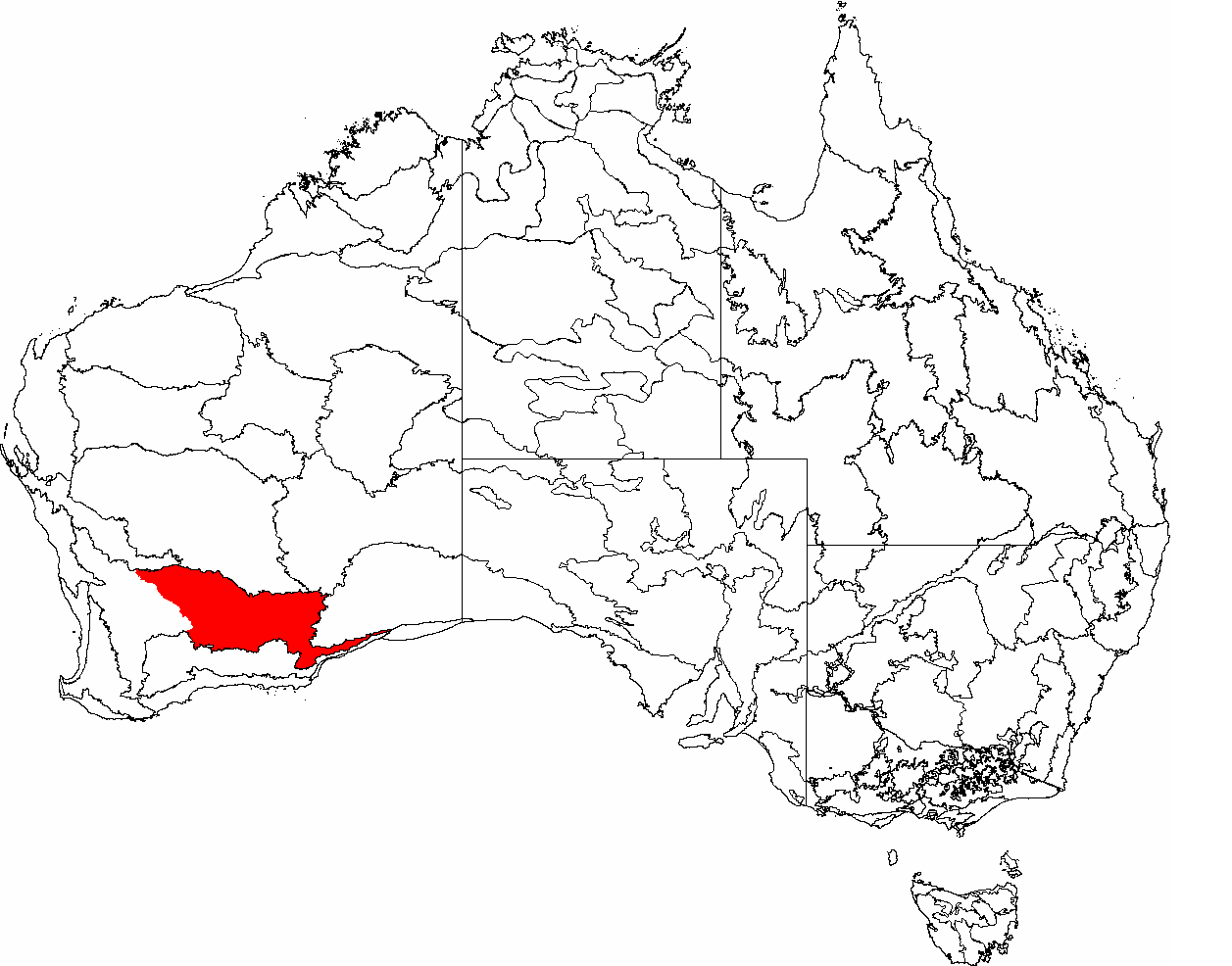
- The interim Australian bioregions, with Coolgardie in red
- Country: Australia
- State: Western Australia

Area
  - Total: 129,122.09 km^{2} (49,854.32 sq mi)
Localities around Coolgardie
| Yalgoo | Murchison | Great Victoria Desert |
| Avon Wheatbelt | Coolgardie | Nullarbor |
| Mallee | Mallee | Hampton |

Coolgardie is an Australian bioregion consisting of an area of low hills and plains of infertile sandy soil in Western Australia. It has an area of 129,122.09 square kilometres (49,854.32 sq mi). It includes much of the Great Western Woodlands.

== Location and description ==
This is a transition zone between the Mediterranean climate of Australia's south-west coast and the country's dry interior. The poor soil makes it unsuitable for agriculture but Coolgardie has been a gold and nickel mining area.

It is bounded on the north by the arid Murchison bioregion, characterised by open mulga woodlands and steppe. The low shrublands of the arid Nullarbor Plain lie to the east.

The Mallee bioregion adjoins Coolgardie on the south. The Avon Wheatbelt bioregion is to the west.

The Coolgardie bioregion, together with the coastal Hampton bioregion to the southeast, constitute the Coolgardie woodlands ecoregion defined by the World Wildlife Fund.

== Flora and fauna ==
The low hills are home to woodland of endemic species of eucalyptus while the sand plains are covered in scrubland. The areas nearer the west coast have more protea flowers while the drier inland is home to acacia trees and kwongan heathland.

Wildlife of the Coolgardie bioregion includes birds such as malleefowl, laughing kookaburra and barking owl, and reptiles such as the thorny devil and desert death adder. Mammals include the echidna, brushtail possum, red kangaroo, eastern wallaroo and bilby.

== Vegetation ==
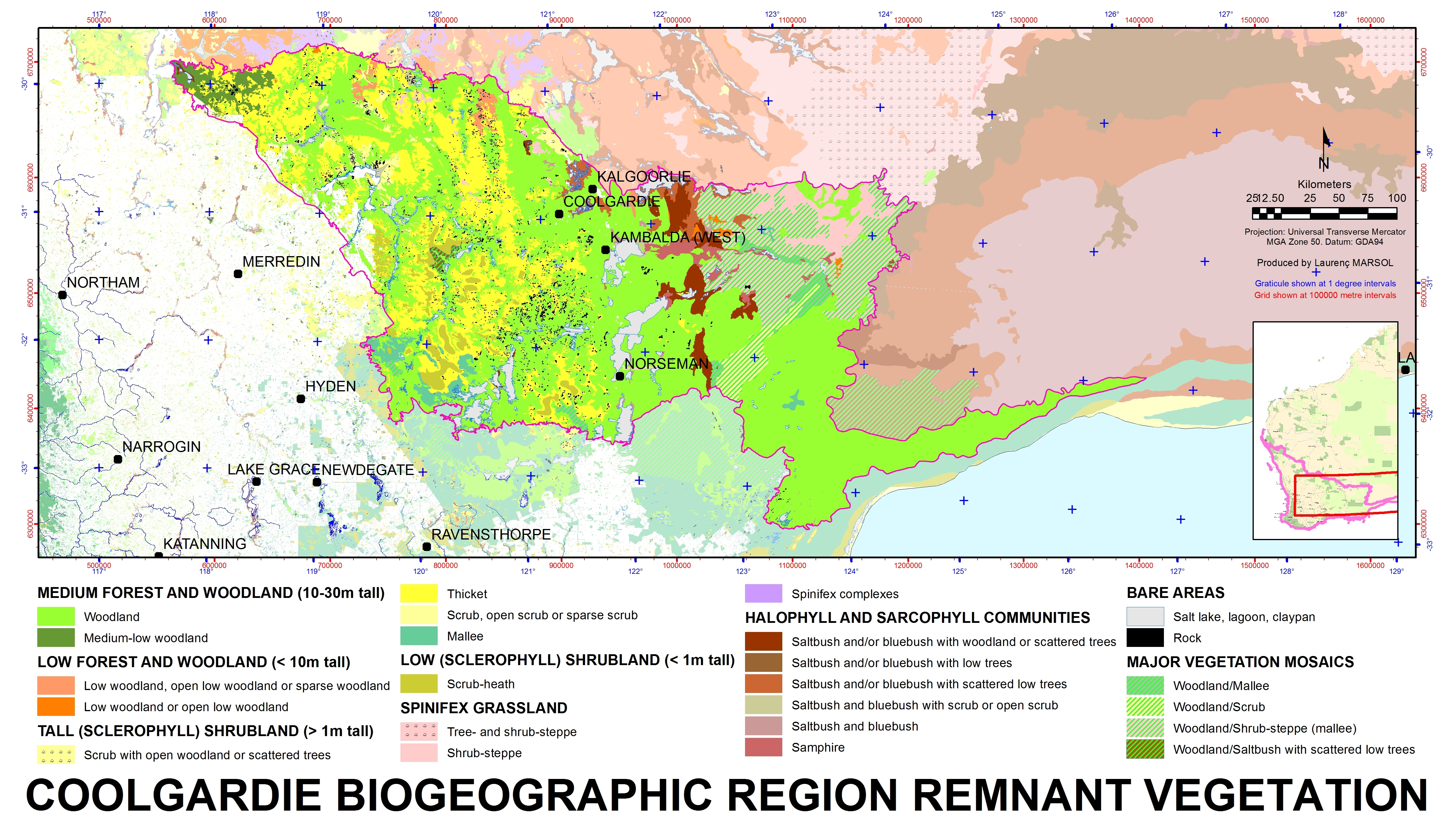
The Coolgardie biogeographic region, with physiognomic remnant vegetation type.
