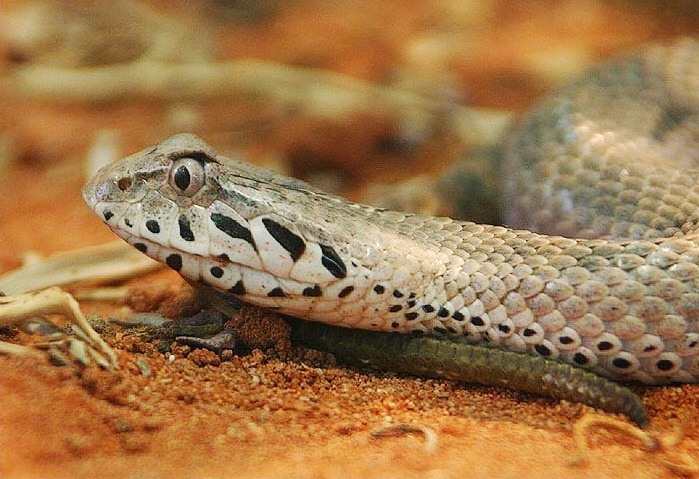

Conservation status
- Least Concern (IUCN 3.1)

Scientific classification
- Kingdom: Animalia
- Phylum: Chordata
- Class: Reptilia
- Order: Squamata
- Suborder: Serpentes
- Family: Elapidae
- Genus: Acanthophis
- Species: A. laevis

Binomial name
- Acanthophis laevis Macleay, 1878

Synonyms
- List: Acanthophis cerastinus ceramensis Gunther, 1863; Acanthophis antarcticus laevis Worrell, 1961; Acanthophis barnetti Hoser, 1998; Acanthophis crotalusei Hoser, 1998; Acanthophis groenveldi Hoser, 2002; Acanthophis macgregori Hoser, 2002; Acanthophis yuwoni Hoser, 2002; Acanthophis ceramensis Wallach et al., 2014

= Smooth-scaled death adder =

Species of snake

The smooth-scaled death adder (Acanthophis laevis), also called the New Guinea death adder, is a venomous species of elapid snake endemic to Southeast Asia and Oceania. Unlike other snakes commonly referred to as "adders", which are nearly all in the Viperidae family, A. laevis is part of the Elapidae, the family containing cobras, coral snakes, mambas and sea snakes, among other venomous species.

A. laevis is an ambush predator, lying in-wait to capture fast-moving prey like birds, small mammals, reptiles and amphibians. The death adders (genus Acanthophis) have a broad diet, mainly consisting of frogs, lizards, and rodents. As with many snakes, females grow larger than males; tail length and head-shape also differ between sexes in some species.

== Distribution and habitat ==
A. laevis is found in Indonesia and Papua New Guinea. In the former country, it is known from various islands across Eastern Indonesia and Maluku Province, including Numfor and Yamdena Islands, as well as the Maluku Islands of Kai Besar, Kai Kecil, Obi, and Seram. On the island of New Guinea, it is known from most regions, including much of Western New Guinea (Indonesia) east to the region of Port Moresby.

== Reproduction ==
A. laevis is ovoviviparous.
