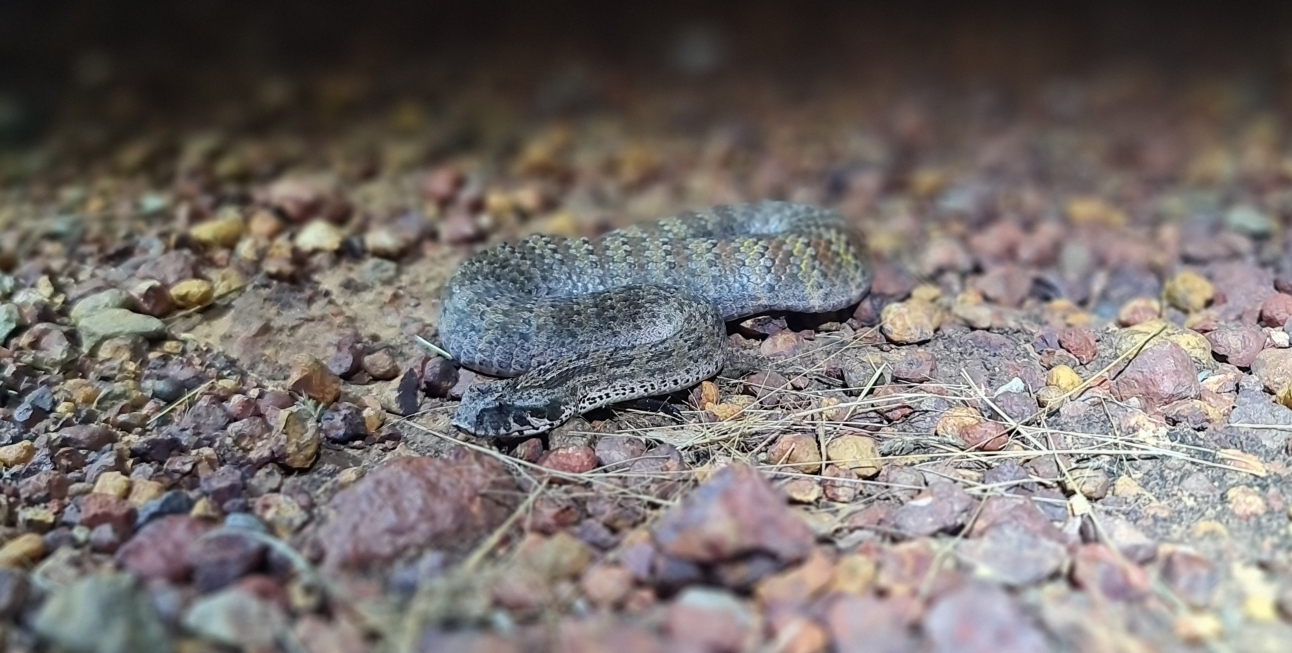

Conservation status
- Least Concern (IUCN 3.1)

Scientific classification
- Kingdom: Animalia
- Phylum: Chordata
- Class: Reptilia
- Order: Squamata
- Suborder: Serpentes
- Family: Elapidae
- Genus: Acanthophis
- Species: A. rugosus

Binomial name
- Acanthophis rugosus Loveridge, 1948

= Rough-scaled death adder =

Species of snake

The rough-scaled death adder (Acanthophis rugosus) is a species of venomous snake in the family Elapidae.

== Habitat ==
They are native to northern Australia, particularly Arnhem Land. Rough-scaled death adders are native to deserts.

== Diet ==
Death adders are generalists that feed upon small mammals, birds, lizards, and frogs. It is likely that allometric (size-related) shifts occur, with smaller specimens feeding more upon lizards and frogs and larger specimens including more mammals in their diets. Regional and interspecific differences in diet may also occur, although these are poorly documented. Like other species in the Elapidae family, they are ground hunters, and can wait for days and days in grass for food.

== Description ==
Body slender to stout, unicolour or with a patterning of crossbands, with smooth or keeled scales in 19-23 rows at midbody, head angular with elevated supraocular scales, 6-7 supralabials with temporolabial scale present, eyes small with vertically elliptical pupils, tail slender, extremely distinct from the body, terminating in a flattened spinous tip which may be black or yellow and contrasts with the dorsal body colouration.
