= Caudal luring =

Form of aggressive mimicry where the predator attracts prey using its tail

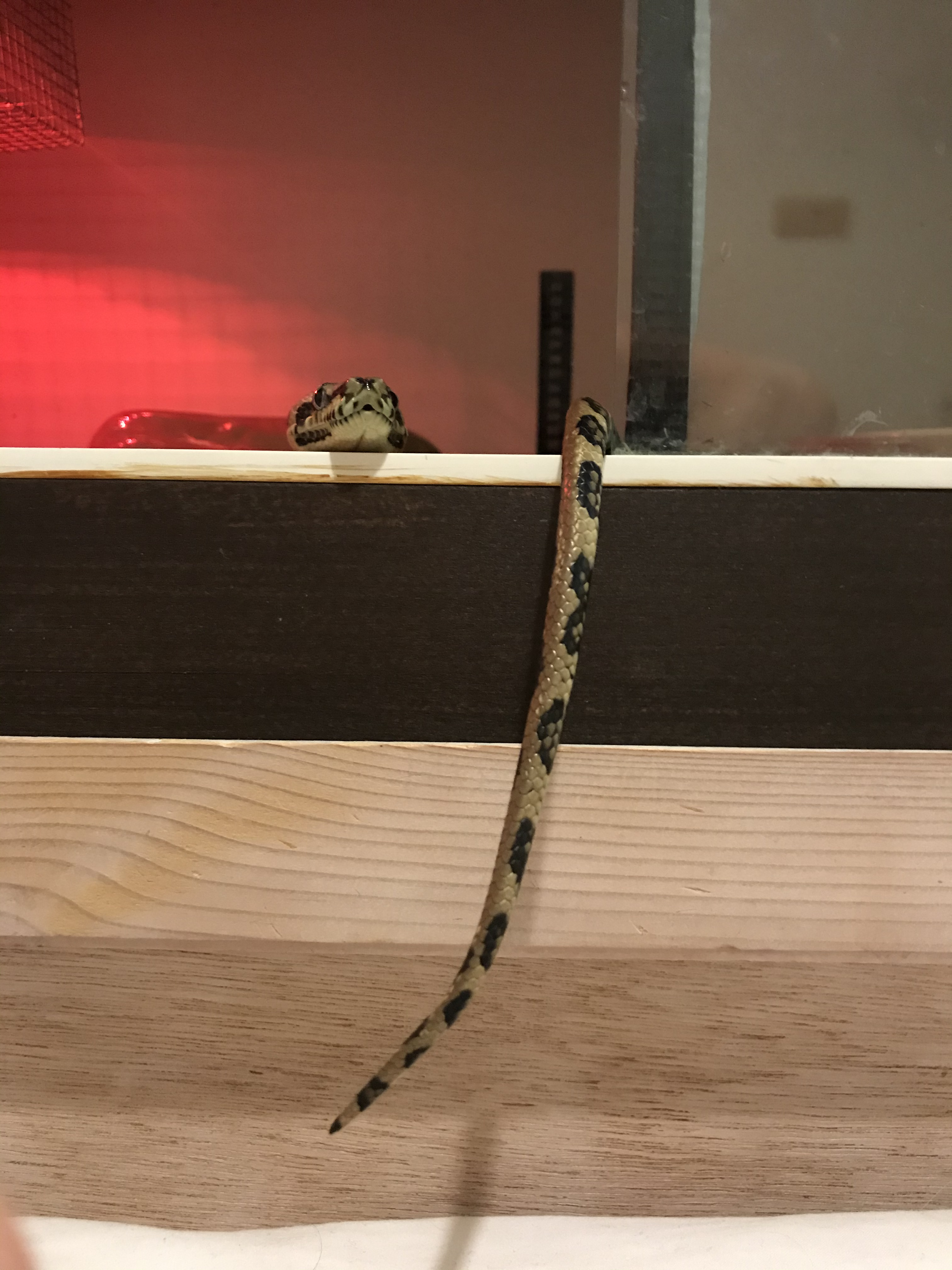
A baby coastal carpet python, Morelia spilota mcdowelli, demonstrating use of its tail as a lure for prey.

Caudal luring is a form of aggressive mimicry characterized by the waving or wriggling of the predator's tail to attract prey. This movement attracts small animals who mistake the tail for a small worm or other small animal. When the animal approaches to prey on the worm-like tail, the predator will strike. This behavior has been recorded in snakes, sharks, and eels.

== Mimicry ==
The tail of a species may serve various functions, such as aggression, defense and feeding. Caudal luring behavior was first recorded in 1878 and is an instance of aggressive mimicry. Predators attract their prey by moving their caudal section to mimic a small animal, such as a worm, and attract prey animals. The prey is intrigued by caudal movement and will investigate assuming it is their own prey, and the predator will strike.

== Species ==
=== Snakes ===
A spider-tailed horned viper moving its spider-shaped tail in order to successfully lure and kill a bird.

Caudal luring behavior is found in over 50 different snake species. It is most common in boas, pythons, tropidophiids, colubrids and elapids of the genus Acanthophis, and the most evident in vipers and pit vipers, especially in rattlesnakes. When the snake is foraging, it waits coiled up with its tail elevated and visible, wiggling around in a way that mimics a smaller animal and captures the attention of its prey. Once the prey is in striking range, the snake attacks. An immobile tail does not attract prey, confirming that it is the moving lure that tricks and attracts prey. Caudal luring behavior is only elicited when prey are nearby. Due to the tail resembling a writhing caterpillar and another worm-like insect larvae, the tail of the snake is often referred to as a vermiform. Some species have developed elaborate lures to mimic a specific animal, such as the spider-tailed horned viper, which employs a highly modified tail to mimic a spider's form and locomotion.

Of the snakes that practice the caudal luring behavior, 80% are juvenile. The tails of juvenile snakes are typically conspicuously colored and fade to become more similar to the rest of the body with age. This has been theorized to be an explanation for why caudal luring is most successful and prevalent in juveniles. However, this explanation has been contested. Experimental manipulation of Sistrurus miliarius’ tail color to make the tail match the rest of the juvenile's body revealed no significant difference in foraging success. Another theory for juvenile success has been that their small tails are more effective lures compared to an adult's larger tail. Studies have confirmed that a smaller lure is more effective in attracting prey, as it is closer to the size of the worm-like prey.

=== Sharks ===
Caudal luring also occurs in sharks, most common among Alopias vulpinus, Alopias superciliosus and Alopias pelagicus. Their tails are all of varying shapes and sizes, but are all used to attract and immobilize prey. Evidence of caudal luring comes from their diet, which consists largely of small schooling fishes which are susceptible to the luring strategy.

The tasselled wobbegong (Eucrossorhinus dasypogon), a carpet shark, has a caudal fin that resembles a small fish with a small dark eyespot. The caudal fin is waved slowly to attract and immobilize prey.

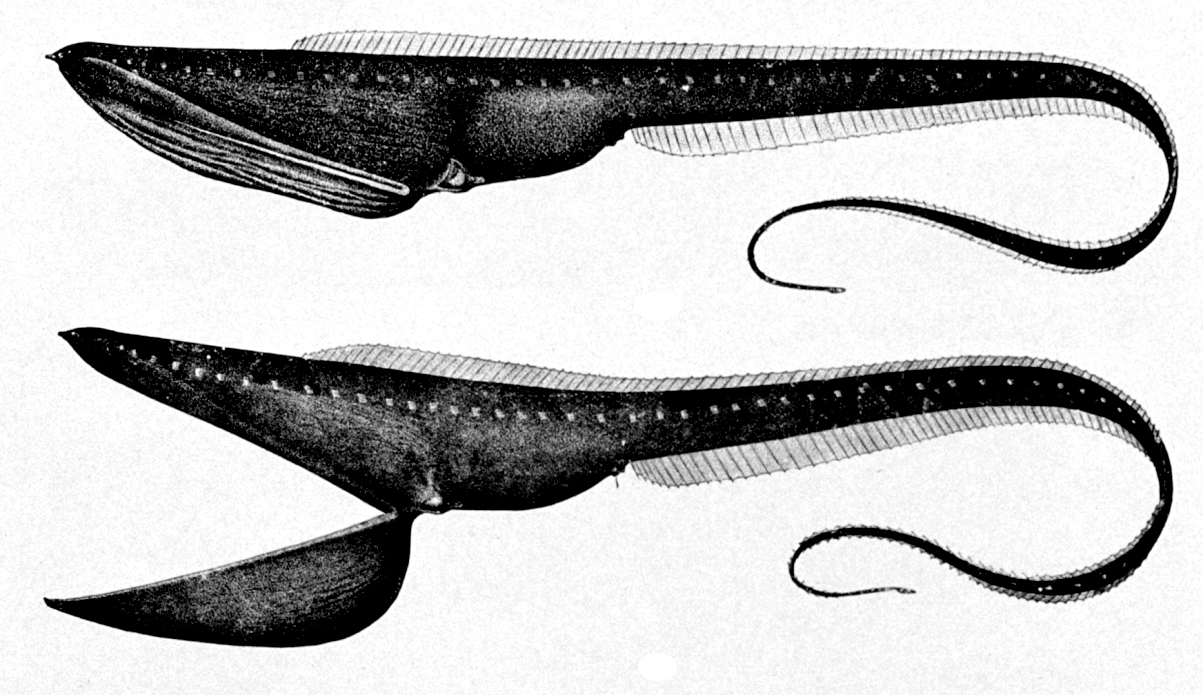
Image of the body structure of Eurypharynx pelecanoides. The end of the tail is luminous and used as a lure.

=== Eels ===
Caudal luring is suspected to occur in the family Saccopharyngidae. The caudal organs of these eels are luminous and equipped with filaments that would facilitate luring. These eels prey solely on relatively large fishes, suggesting the use of a lure to trap their prey.

== Evolution ==
It has been suggested that caudal luring was involved in the evolution of the tail vibration rattle of rattlesnakes, a warning signal and a way of auditory communication, though this has been challenged. Prey luring, in general, is confounded by false interpretation, as the wiggling of an appendage could have other behavioral meanings including aposematism, defense, or nervous release, and experimental evidence has been weak.

Caudal luring is thought to have evolved from a caudally localized intention movement (a behavior derived from locomotor movements). Essentially, the act of remaining stationary while sensing prey produces general nervous system excitation that gets released in the form of tail movements. Caudal luring is not merely tail undulations, but must specifically be attractive to prey. Caudal distraction is another behavior used by snakes, and the tail motions are similar to caudal luring. The difference is in the snake's posture and especially in the nature and outcome of the behavior in reference to the encounter with prey. Other caudal luring-like movements occur as warning signals and are induced by stressful circumstances.
