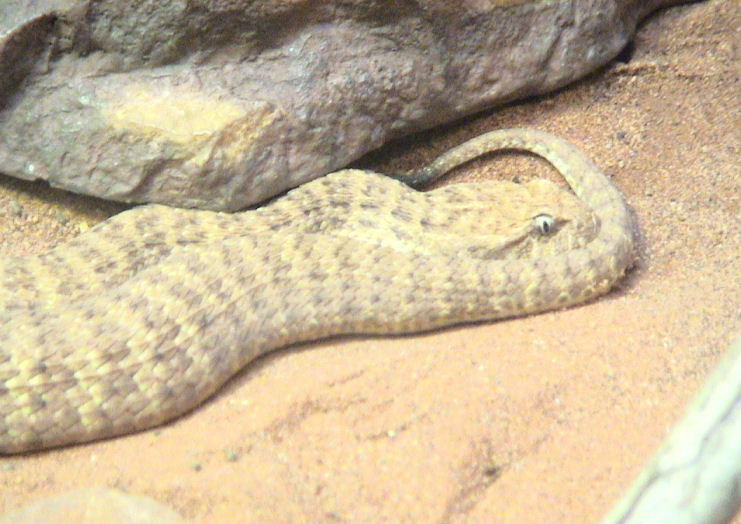
- Yellow-reddish desert death adder

Conservation status
- Least Concern (IUCN 3.1)

Scientific classification
- Kingdom: Animalia
- Phylum: Chordata
- Class: Reptilia
- Order: Squamata
- Suborder: Serpentes
- Family: Elapidae
- Genus: Acanthophis
- Species: A. pyrrhus

Binomial name
- Acanthophis pyrrhus Boulenger, 1898
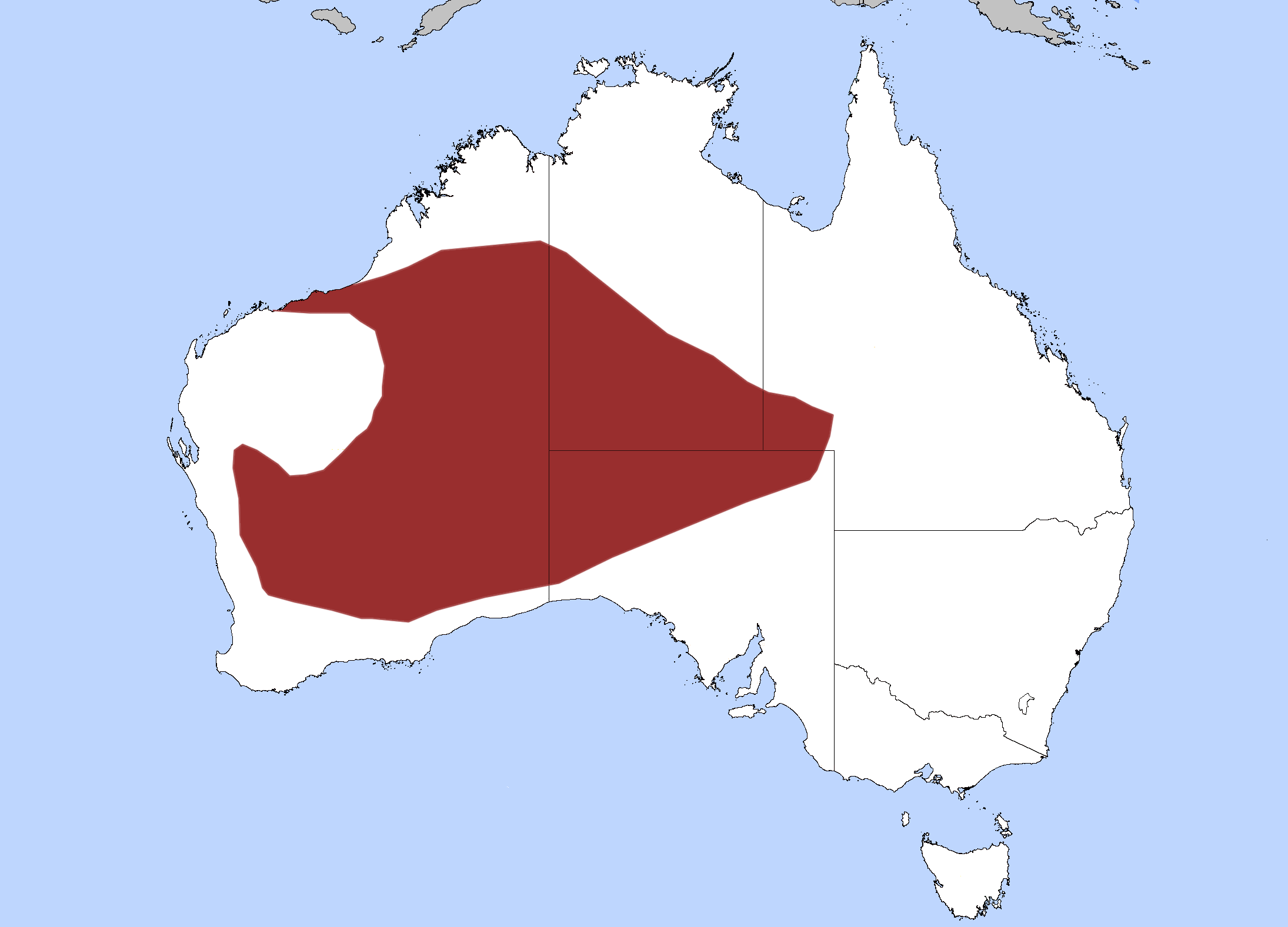
- Image depicting the range of the desert death adder

= Desert death adder =

Species of snake

The desert death adder (Acanthophis pyrrhus) is a species of snake native to Australia and is one of the most venomous land snakes in the world. The desert death adder is under threat due to the destruction of habitat.

== Description ==
Desert death adders are members of the genus Acanthophis, highly venomous elapids with short and thick bodies, triangular heads, mobile fangs, and a thin tapering tail. They grow to lengths up to 70 centimeters, with a snout to vent length of 62 cm, and have a flattened appearance. Desert death adders are coloured brick-red, or yellow-reddish, with strong or inconspicuous yellow bands which are camouflaged with their surroundings. The tail tip is used as a lure to attract potential prey and is distinctively darker in colour. Their fangs are longer than most of Australia's venomous snakes.

The species was first described in 1898 by George Albert Boulenger.

== Distribution and habitat ==
The desert death adder occurs from the coast of Western Australia, to central regions as far south as Kalgoorlie and into the Northern Territory. The related species, the common or southern death adder, is found in a different range.

Desert death adders are found living in remote areas, amongst porcupine grass, stony flats, sandy ridges and rocky outcrops of Central and Western Australia. In southwest Australia they occur in hummock grass in mallee.

== Behaviour ==
The desert death adder only bites if the threat or prey is very close to them. They also use their bite to catch their prey. They are usually most active after dark, only occasionally being seen during the day. They may climb shrubs or grasses to bask in the morning, and are seen on roads near outlying urban areas.

Desert death adders feed on lizards, especially skinks and dragons, and small mammals. They are attracted to the snake, which may lie in a patient ambush for days, by the wiggling of the lure at the tip of the tail like its sister species, the common death adder. When moved it bears a striking resemblance to a worm or caterpillar and is thus a tempting morsel for a passing lizard.

== Venom ==
Desert death adders have large fangs, and their glands produce a considerable quantity of toxic venom. Today, it rarely is the cause of snake bites in Australia. They are regarded as very dangerous. The venom is most significantly neurotoxin, which once had a 50% mortality rate.

== Reproduction ==
Desert death adders mate during spring or early summer, with the babies being produced in late summer or early autumn. Unlike most other snakes, desert death adders give birth to live young. Up to 13 live young may be produced in each litter.
