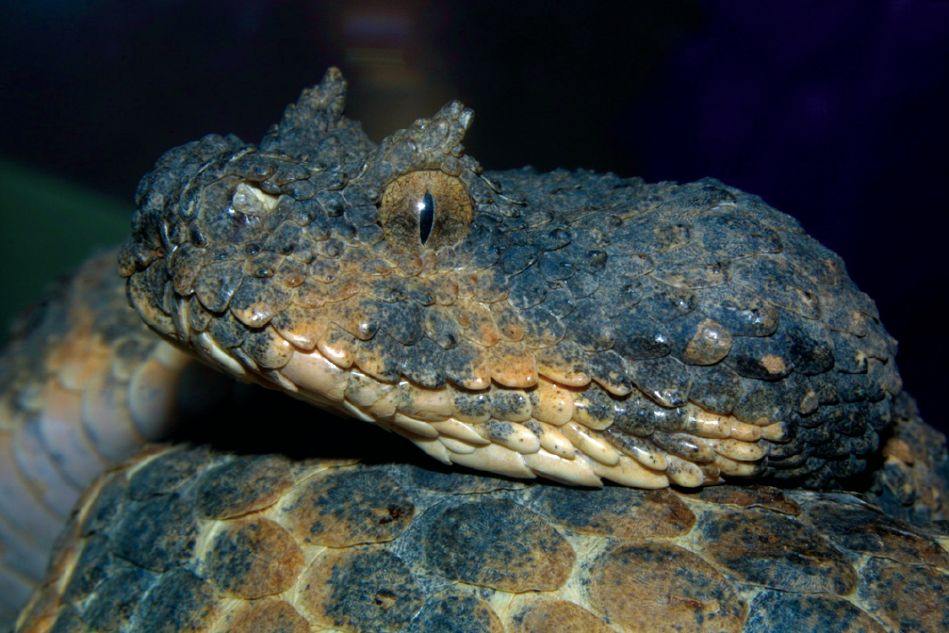

Conservation status
- Least Concern (IUCN 3.1)

Scientific classification
- Kingdom: Animalia
- Phylum: Chordata
- Class: Reptilia
- Order: Squamata
- Suborder: Serpentes
- Family: Viperidae
- Genus: Pseudocerastes
- Species: P. persicus

Binomial name
- Pseudocerastes persicus (A.M.C. Duméril, Bibron & A.H.A. Duméril, 1854)

Synonyms
- Pseudocerastes Boulenger, 1896; Cerastes Persicus A.M.C. Duméril, Bibron & A.H.A. Duméril, 1854; Vipera persica — Jan, 1859; V[ipera]. (Cerastes) persica — Jan, 1863; Pseudocerastes persicus — Boulenger, 1896; Pseudocerastes bicornis Wall, 1913; Vipera persica persica — Marx & Rabb, 1965; Pseudocerastes persicus persicus — Minton, Dowling & Russell, 1968; Daboia (Pseudocerastes) persica persica — Obst, 1983; Pseudocerastes persicus — Latifi, 1991

= Persian horned viper =

Species of snake

The Persian horned viper (Pseudocerastes persicus), known as the Persian horned viper, false horned viper, and by other common names, is a species of vipers endemic to the Middle East and Asia. Like all other vipers, it is venomous.

== Description ==
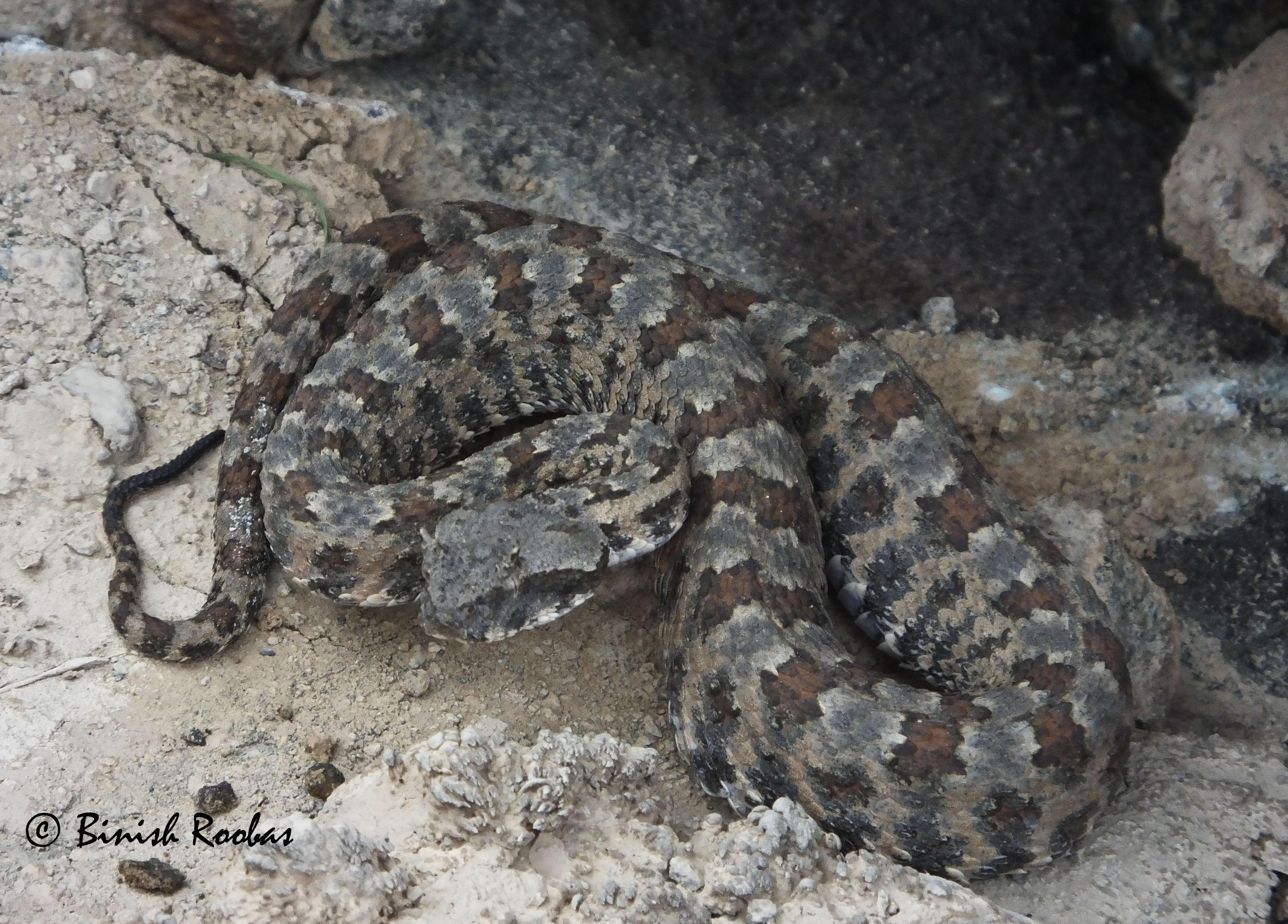
Persian Horned viper from Al Hajar Mountains of United Arab Emirates

Adults average between 40 and 70 cm (16 and 28 in) in total length (body + tail), with a maximum total length of 108 cm (43 in) being reported. Females are usually larger than males. These snakes can attain a considerable weight relative to their size, with specimens sometimes exceeding 500 g (1.1 lb).

The head is broad, flat, distinct from the neck and covered with small, imbricate scales. The snout is short and rounded. The nostrils are positioned dorsolaterally and have valves. The nasal scale is unbroken. The rostral scale is small and wide. The eyes are medium in size with vertically elliptical pupils. There are 15-20 interocular scales and 15-20 circumorbitals. The supraorbital hornlike structure above each eye consists of small, imbricate scales and is also present in juveniles. There are 11-14 supralabials and 13-17 sublabials. 2-4 rows of small scales separate the supralabial scales from the suboculars.

The body is covered with weakly to strongly keeled dorsal scales. On many of these, the keel terminates before the end of the scale and forms a bump. Many others form a point. At midbody, there are 21-25 scale rows, none of them oblique. There are 134-163 ventral scales and 35-50 paired subcaudals. The tail is short.

== Common names ==
Persian horned viper, false horned viper, Persian horned desert viper, eye-horned viper.

== Etymology ==
The species name comes from where it is most usually found, Persia (present-day Iran), and the hornlike structures above its eyes.

== Geographic range ==
Pseudocerastes persicus is found in Iran, Pakistan, Afghanistan, northern Oman, the United Arab Emirates, Jordan, and throughout Iraq.

The type locality is listed as "Perse" (= Persia).

== Habitat ==
This species likes sandy (but not sand dune) or basalt and limestone rock desert and hill country, usually with some vegetation. It tends to avoid areas of human habitation.

== Behavior ==
These snakes are generally rather slow-moving and may employ various methods of locomotion, including sidewinding, serpentine, and rectilinear. They are also terrestrial and almost totally nocturnal, only being seen during the day or early evening during colder periods. It is not particularly aggressive, but will hiss loudly when disturbed. It is not capable of sinking into the sand vertically like Cerastes. These feed mainly on lizards, small mammals, mice and occasionally small birds and arthropods, but will also eat dead food.

== Reproduction ==
It is oviparous, and sexually mature females lay 11-21 eggs. When produced, these already contain well-developed embryos, each of which can be as much as 8.5 cm (3.3 in) in total length. As a result, they hatch after only 30–32 days at 31 °C and then measure 14.0 to 16.2 cm (5.5 to 6.4 in) in total length. They do well in captivity and are relatively easy to breed.

== Venom ==
Pseudocerastes persicus venom exhibits strong hemorrhagic activity typical of most vipers. No antivenom is available for bites from this species, although it is reported that a polyvalent antiserum does offer some protection.
