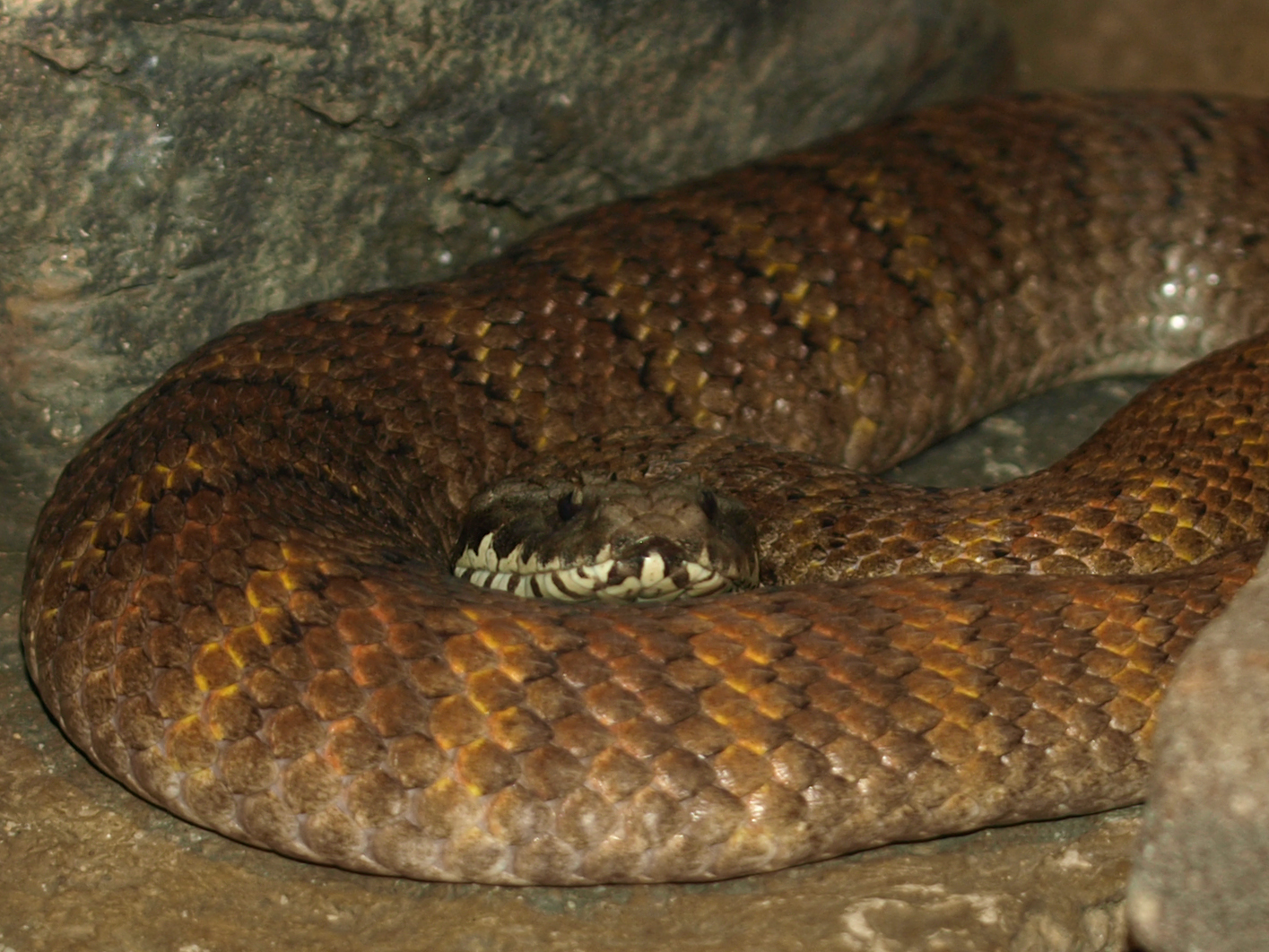

Conservation status
- Least Concern (IUCN 3.1)

Scientific classification
- Kingdom: Animalia
- Phylum: Chordata
- Class: Reptilia
- Order: Squamata
- Suborder: Serpentes
- Family: Elapidae
- Genus: Acanthophis
- Species: A. praelongus

Binomial name
- Acanthophis praelongus Ramsay, 1877

= Northern death adder =

Species of snake

The northern death adder (Acanthophis praelongus) is a species of venomous snake in the family Elapidae.

The northern death adder lives in Australia and Papua New Guinea. It hunts birds, amphibians, and small mammals both by day and night. Though it resembles a viper, it belongs to the elapid family, which also includes cobras and mambas.

== Venom ==
The venom of the northern death adder is highly potent against the human organism. It contains pre- and postsynaptic neurotoxins, possibly myotoxins and anticoagulants as well. An envenoming by this snake is very dangerous, and all bites should be treated as medical emergencies. Main effects include local pain and flaccid paralysis, death can be caused by respiratory failure. In the case of systemic effects of envenoming key treatment is based on antivenom applications ('Polyvalent Snake Antivenom (Australia - New Guinea)' CSL Limited, 'Death Adder Antivenom', CSL Limited).

== Habitat ==
Northern death adders can be found in a wide range of habitats, including mangroves, tropical and subtropical moist broadleaf forests, tropical and subtropical grasslands, savannas, and shrubland.
