= Common death adder =

Conservation status
- Least Concern (IUCN 3.1)

Scientific classification
- Kingdom: Animalia
- Phylum: Chordata
- Class: Reptilia
- Order: Squamata
- Suborder: Serpentes
- Family: Elapidae
- Genus: Acanthophis
- Species: A. antarcticus

Binomial name
- Acanthophis antarcticus (Shaw, 1802)
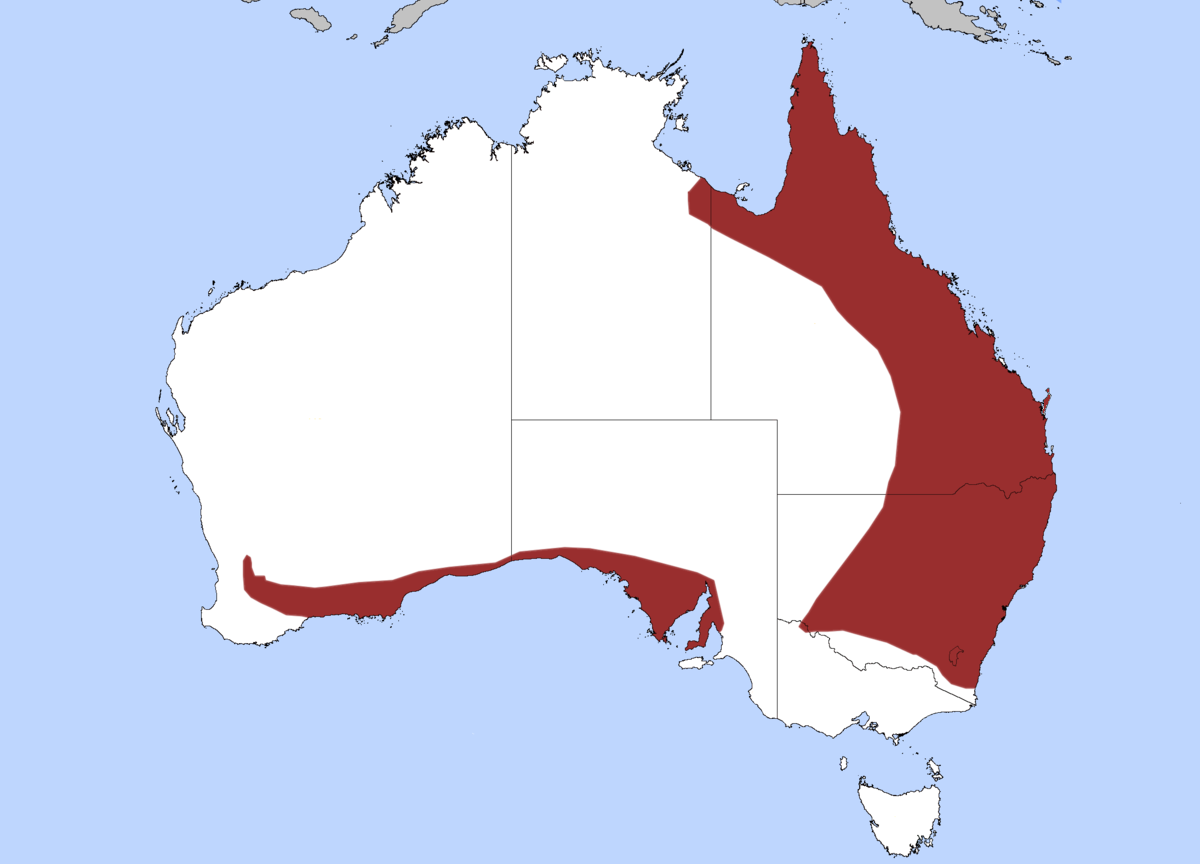
- Distribution of the common death adder in Australia

Synonyms
- List: Boa antarctica Shaw, 1802; Acanthophis cerastinus Daudin, 1803; Acanthophis brownii Leach, 1814; Boa ambigua Leach, 1814; Ophryas acantophis Merrem, 1820; Vipera acanthophis Schlegel, 1837; Vipera sorda Salvado, 1851; Boa aculeata Boulenger, 1896

Species of snake

The common death adder (Acanthophis antarcticus) is a species of death adder, a venomous snake in the family Elapidae. The species is endemic to Australia. It is one of the most venomous land snakes in Australia and globally. While it remains widespread (unlike related species), it is facing increased threat from the ongoing Australian cane toad invasion.

== Taxonomy ==
The common death adder was first described as a species new to science in 1802 by English biologist George Kearsley Shaw, who named it Boa antarctica. Unlike the common European viper, the common death adder is a member of the snake family Elapidae, rather than the family Viperidae (vipers).

== Description ==
The common death adder has a broad, flattened, triangular head and a thick body. Dorsally, its color pattern consists of crossbands of red, brown, and black on a lighter background. Ventrally, it is grey, cream, or pink. It is known to reach a snout-to-vent length (SVL) of 70–100 cm (2.3–3.3 ft).

The dorsal scales are arranged in 21–23 rows at midbody. The ventrals number 113–130. The anal plate is entire. The subcaudals number 41–51, and are undivided (single) anteriorly but divided (paired) posteriorly.

== Geographic distribution ==
The common death adder occurs abundantly over much of eastern and coastal southern Australia: Queensland, New South Wales, and South Australia. It is more scarce in the Northern Territory, Western Australia and the western parts of South Australia, and is no longer found in Victoria.

== Habitat ==
The common death adder is found in forests, woodlands, grasslands, and heaths of the eastern coast of Australia. Thanks to its crossbands, the common death adder is a master of camouflage, hiding beneath loose leaf litter and debris in woodland, shrubland, and grassland.

== Conservation concerns ==
Habitat loss and the spread of the invasive cane toad (Rhinella marina) are concerns. The cane toad eats young death adders, and adult death adders that eat the cane toad are poisoned by the toxic glands on the toad's skin.

== Diet ==
The common death adder preys upon small mammals and birds as a primary diet. Unlike other elapids, the common death adder lies in wait for its prey (often for many days) until a meal passes. It covers itself with leaves, making itself inconspicuous, and lies coiled in ambush, twitching its grub-like tail close to its head as a lure. When an animal approaches to investigate the movement, the death adder quickly strikes, injecting its venom and then waiting for the victim to die before eating it. The common death adder is not aggressive toward humans, yet its ambush hunting technique and reliance on camouflage rather than flight to avoid threats renders it more dangerous than other elapids to humans who venture into bushland habitats.

== Reproduction ==
Unlike most snakes, the common death adder produces litters of live young. In the late summer, a female common death adder will produce a litter of approximately 3–20 live offspring. However, over 30 young have been recorded in a single litter.
