= Common sand viper =

Common sand viper may refer to:

- Vipera ammodytes, a.k.a. the nose-horned viper, venomous species found in southern Europe through to the Balkans and parts of the Middle East
- Cerastes vipera, a.k.a. the Avicenna viper, a venomous species found in the deserts of North Africa and the Sinai Peninsula
