= Echidna atricaudata =

Echidna atricaudata (a taxonomic synonym) may refer to:

- Cerastes cerastes, a.k.a. the desert horned viper, a venomous viper native to the deserts of Northern Africa and parts of the Middle East
- Cerastes vipera, a.k.a. the sahara sand viper, a venomous viper found in the deserts of North Africa and the Sinai Peninsula
