= Vipera (Echidna) avicennae =

Vipera (Echidna) avicennae is a taxonomic synonym that may refer to:

- Cerastes cerastes, a.k.a. the desert horned viper, a venomous viper species native to the deserts of Northern Africa and parts of the Middle East
- Cerastes vipera, a.k.a. the Sahara sand viper, a venomous viper species found in the deserts of North Africa and the Sinai Peninsula
