= European viper =

European viper may refer to:

- Vipera berus, the common European adder, a venomous snake widespread in Europe and Asia
- Vipera aspis, the European asp, a venomous snake found in southwestern Europe
