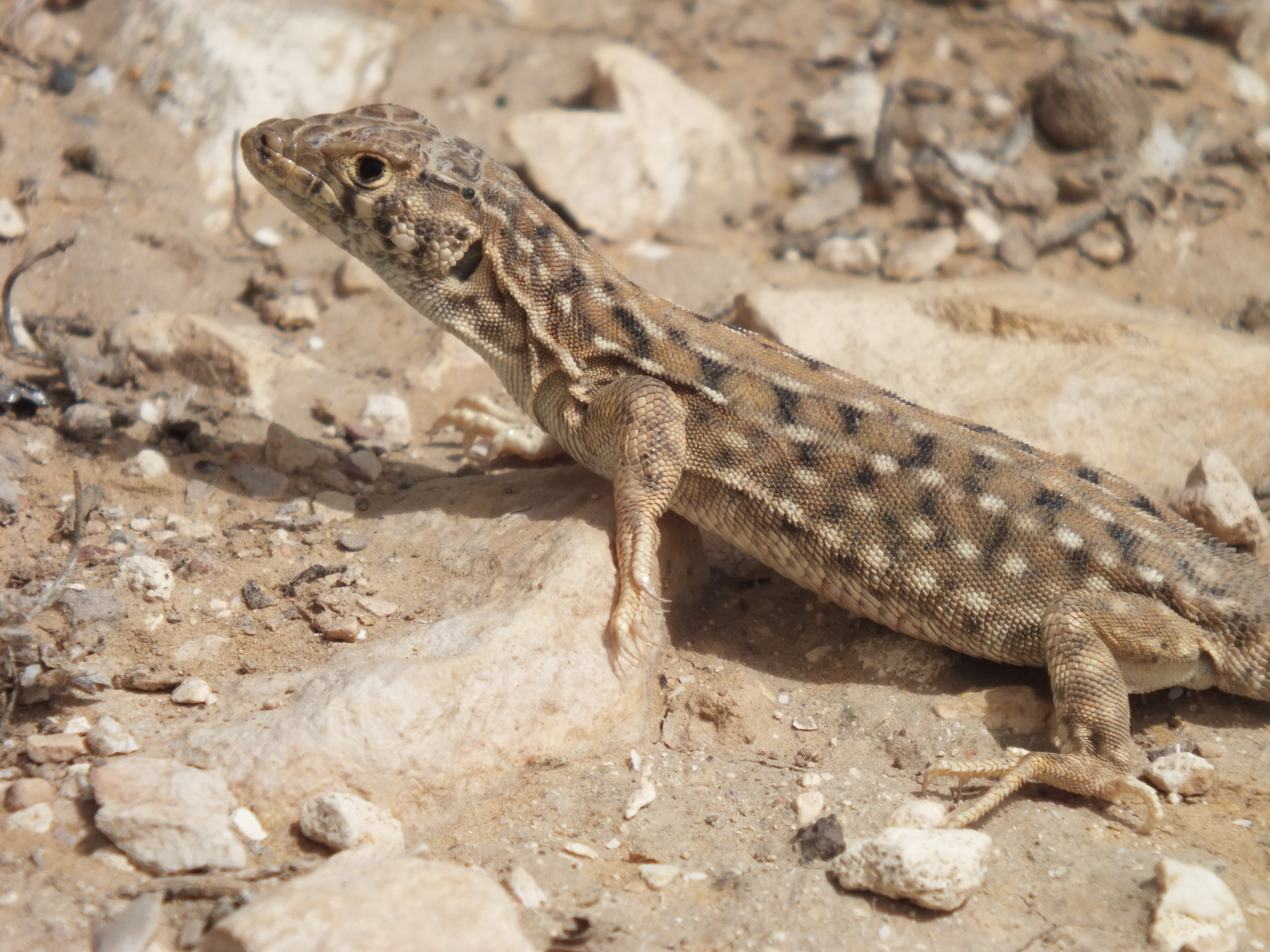

Conservation status
- Critically Endangered (IUCN 3.1)

Scientific classification
- Kingdom: Animalia
- Phylum: Chordata
- Class: Reptilia
- Order: Squamata
- Family: Lacertidae
- Genus: Acanthodactylus
- Species: A. beershebensis

Binomial name
- Acanthodactylus beershebensis Moravec, Baha El Din, Seligmann, Sivan & Werner, 1999

= Be'er Sheva fringe-fingered lizard =

Species of lizard

The Be'er Sheva fringe-fingered lizard (Acanthodactylus beershebensis) is a species of lizard in the family Lacertidae. It is a member of the subfamily Lacertinae, and the genus Acanthodactylus (spiny footed lizards). Considered a separate species based on morphological distinction and isolated location, it shares a large portion of its genetics with Acanthodactylus pardalis in this genus. Many of the individual species in this genus are similar, but varying coloration explains why each species has been separated. Like all Acanthodactylus, A. beershebensis lays eggs, varying from three to seven eggs at a time. Adults vary in size from 17 to 20 cm (6.7 to 7.9 in), but can get much larger. The species is endemic to the loess scrublands of the Negev desert in Israel, a biodiversity hotspot.

A. beershebensis was declared critically endangered after an assessment in 2006 of serious population decline. Some estimates claim numbers have dropped 80% over the last three generations. The small populations are severely fragmented across the Negev desert. This decline has been caused by habitat destruction and degradation.

== Appearance and offspring ==
The hatchlings of A. beershebensis have a bright blue tail and dark and yellowish stripes on the body. However, a few weeks after birth, the tail becomes brownish gray, and the body turns to a blotchy brownish, sand-gray coloration, which remains through adulthood. This pattern gives the name to the "Acanthodactylus pardalis group" to which A. beershebensis belongs. (In Greek, pardalis, means leopard). On average, the species live less than a year, hatching around the end of May.

=== Colorful tails ===
All Acanthodactylus species (A. longipes, A. scutellatus, A. beershebensis, A. boskianus, A. schreiberi ) that change tail colour after a few weeks after birth also go through behavioural changes. However, the changes can differ between species; an example would be in foraging movements. Colourful tails and striped patterns on lizards may be used as anti-predator mechanisms. In the early stages of life of Acanthodactylus beershebensis', its colourful tail may be used to "shoo off" predators. After its tail changes colour, the lizard becomes less vulnerable to predators, thus not needing it anymore.

== Geographic range and habitat ==
A. beershebensis live only in south-central Israel. Its natural habitat is tropical dry shrubland. It generally lives in the loess plains of the northern Negev desert located in Israel and Palestine territory. The Be'er Sheva fringe-fingered lizard is the most common species in this habitat. The area that the species inhibits is less than 10 km^{2} (3.9 sq mi) in size and the species lives randomly distributed throughout the area. The Be'er Sheva fringe-fingered lizard lives in a structurally simple environment with few perches in which the species can hide from its predators. The species live in an area where trees and other covers are scarce and avoids areas inhabited by predators. The lizard does not rely on perches or covers provided by trees for survival.

The habitat of the northern Negev desert is such that a more complex or a higher quality habitat would do more harm than good. A higher quality habitat would only bring in more predatory species that would severely affect the lizard population.

== Behavior and diet ==
The diet of A. beershebensis is influenced by predation. The lizard has found ways to adapt its diet accordingly. When under greater threat, it moves around less, catching and consuming smaller prey and less plant material. Its diet shifts toward foods that take less time to catch and to eat. The reptile also becomes less selective and eats a more diverse range of food when under predatory pressure.

== Conservation ==
A. beershebensis is a critically endangered species, partly due to an ecological trap created by the conservation of plant biomass and species richness within its habitat. The conservation plan constructed pits and planted trees in order to reduce resource leakage in the ecosystem. When trees are planted in perch-less habitats it increases the number of avian predators and gives them a hunting advantage. This manipulating of the habitat made it less suitable for the lizard and heightened its chance of predation. The Be'er Sheva fringe-fingered lizard disappeared from its natural and altered habitats 11 years after the construction of the conservation plan. The spatial uncommonness of natural perches and man-made perches hindered the lizard's ability to correlate perches with a low quality habitat. Thus, the rapid increases in the number of available perches lead the lizard to perceive its natural habitat to be as risky as its altered habitat, creating an equal-preference ecological trap.

=== Threats ===
Threats for the Be'er Sheva fringe-fingered lizard include habitat destruction and predation. Intensive agriculture, urbanization, and grazing animals are the factors contributing to the destruction of the lizard's home. It is also easily caught by birds, like falcons and egrets, whose numbers are increasing due to continued tree planting in its niche.

=== Conservation efforts ===
The national legislation in Israel currently protects a small area of the former habitat of A. beershebensis.

== Taxonomy ==
While A. beershebensis is considered critically endangered, its similar genetic cousin A. pardalis is not. Studies have shown many of these species are so genetically similar that they all share similar threats. Since these species are all facing similar threats, all of them should share the same critically endangered label to preserve the diversity. Conservation efforts will be focused on the endemic species, meaning further research is need to sort out this genus to properly focus efforts.
