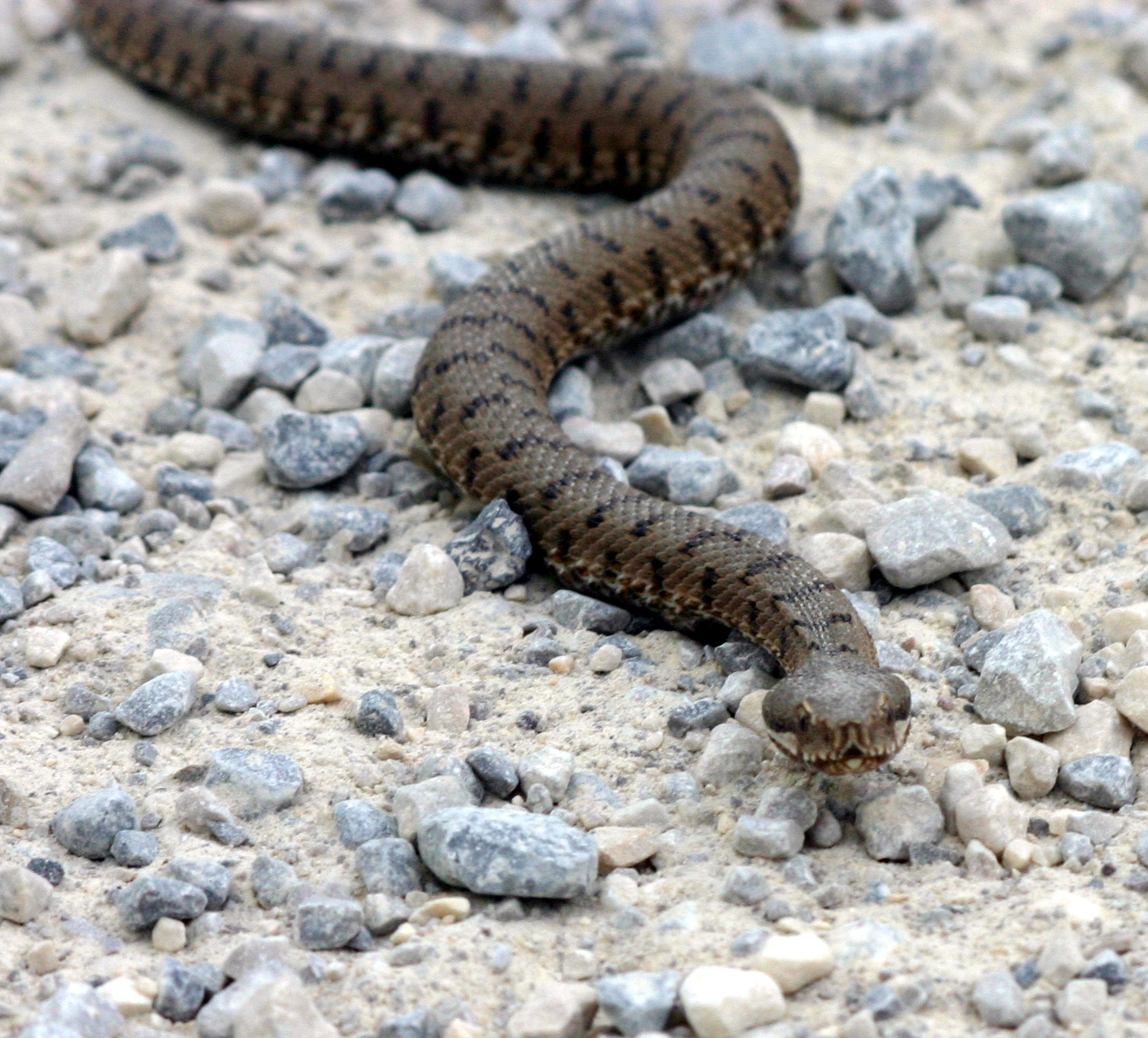

Conservation status
- Least Concern (IUCN 3.1)

Scientific classification
- Kingdom: Animalia
- Phylum: Chordata
- Class: Reptilia
- Order: Squamata
- Suborder: Serpentes
- Family: Viperidae
- Genus: Vipera
- Species: V. aspis
- Subspecies: V. a. francisciredi

Trinomial name
- Vipera aspis francisciredi Laurenti, 1768

Synonyms
- Vipera Francisci Redi Laurenti, 1768; [Coluber] Redi — Gmelin, 1788; Vipera Redi — Sonnini & Latreille, 1801; Vipera aspis var. rufa Bonaparte, 1834; Vipera aspis var. fusca Bonaparte, 1834; [Vipera aspis] var. rufescens De Betta, 1853 (nomen nudum); [Vipera aspis] var. cineria De Betta, 1853 (nomen nudum); Vipera aspis var. vulgaris Massalongo, 1853; Vipera aspis var. plumbea Massalongo, 1854; Vipera aspis var. cinera De Betta, 1857; Vipera aspis var. cinerascens De Betta, 1857; Vipera aspis var. rufescens — De Betta, 1857; Vipera aspis var. brunnea De Betta, 1857; Vipera aspis var. fulva De Betta, 1857; Vipera aspis var. rufiventris De Betta, 1857; Vipera aspis var. fusca-plumbeiventris De Betta, 1857; Vipera aspis var. Isabellina De Betta, 1857; Vipera aspis var. redii — Calabresi, 1924; Vipera aspis francisciredi — Kramer, 1971; Vipera aspis heinzdischeki Sochurek, 1979; Vipera (Rhinaspis) aspis francisredi — Obst, 1983

= Vipera aspis francisciredi =

Subspecies of snake

Common names: Central Italian asp.

Vipera aspis francisciredi is a venomous subspecies of the European asp endemic to northern and central Italy and adjacent Croatia, Slovenia, and Switzerland.

== Etymology ==
The subspecific name, francisciredi, is in honor of Francesco Redi, an Italian physician who was a pioneer in experimental toxinology.

== Description ==
The head is distinctly swollen behind the eyes and upper lips; in adults, this feature is clearly visible when viewed from above.

Regarding the color pattern, many examples of this subspecies have a white or cream-colored spot near the outer edge of each ventral scale; these spots are smaller in V. a. aspis (if at all present), but much more apparent in V. a. francisciredi.

== Geographic range ==
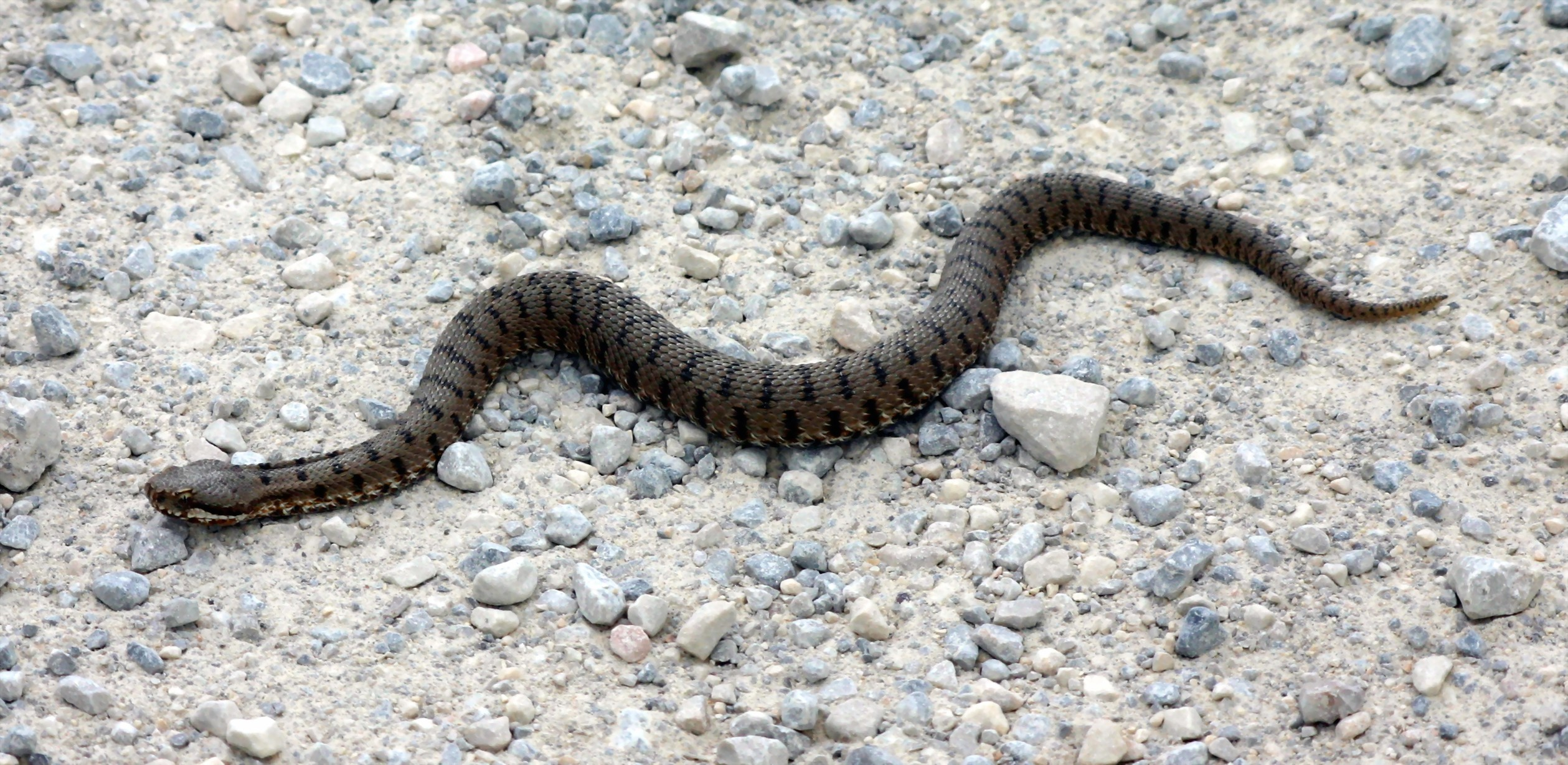
V. a. francisciredi near Pienza, Italy

Street (1979) describes this subspecies as inhabiting most of Italy, where it is the most common and widely distributed venomous snake. It also occurs in the Swiss canton of Ticino, south of the Monte Ceneri Pass, but is not found west of nearby Lake Maggiore. Also in the north, in Trentino-Alto Adige/Südtirol, it can be found as far north as Meran, but is not found in Austria, and as far east as Gorizia (on the border with Slovenia). In the south of Italy, it is absent from Basilicata and Calabria.

In the former Yugoslavia, it is a rare inhabitant of the Julian Alps (Pozzi, 1966). There have been reports of specimens from Ripanj near Belgrade, Jahorin in Bosnia and other parts of "Yugoslavia", but some of these may have been confused with V. berus bosniensis. Nevertheless, the European Molecular Biology Laboratory (EMBL) describes the range of this subspecies as stretching from southern Switzerland, northern and central Italy, to Slovenia and northwestern Croatia.

The type locality listed by Laurenti (1768) for Vipera Francisci Redi (= V. a. francisciredi) is "Austriaco & Italico" (= Austria and Italy).

== Conservation status ==
The whole species is classified as Least Concern (LC) according to the IUCN Red List of Threatened Species (v3.1, 2008). This subspecies is however considered Endangered (EN) in Switzerland due to its very limited occupation area.
