= Yehudah L. Werner =

Israeli herpetologist (1931–2026)

- יהודה ורנר
- Born: Yehudah Leopold Werner; 1931; Munich, Weimar Republic
- Died: 5 June 2026 (aged 95)
- Scientific career
- Fields: Herpetology
- Workplaces: Hebrew University of Jerusalem

Yehudah Leopold Werner (1931 – 5 June 2026) was an Israeli herpetologist and academic who was Professor Emeritus at the Alexander Silberman Institute of Life Sciences, the Hebrew University of Jerusalem (Department of Evolution, Systematics and Ecology).

== Life and career ==
Werner was born in Munich in 1931. The family fled from Nazi Germany in 1933, immigrating to Palestine via France and England in 1935. Werner studied under Georg Haas (1905–1981), an emigrant from Austria who was Professor in Jerusalem, who guided his PhD at the Hebrew University of Jerusalem.

During his long scientific career, Werner published more than 400 titles. Among other things, the biology of the geckos, including their vocal communication, as well as the zoogeography and conservation of the reptiles and amphibians in the Middle East are his main themes. Werner was a co-founder of the Society for the Protection of Nature in Israel and served as chairperson of the Zoological Society of Israel.

Werner died on 5 June 2026, at the age of 95.

== Taxa described by Yehudah Werner ==
Yehudah Werner described or redescribed (alone or with co-authors) a number of amphibian and reptile taxa:

- Hyla heinzsteinitzi Grach, Plesser & Werner, 2007 (this species is a synonym of H. japonica that has been apparently introduced into Israel, see Molecular Phylogenetics and Evolution 49: 1019–1024.)
- Acanthodactylus ahmaddisii Werner, 2004
- Acanthodactylus beershebensis Moravec, Baha El Din, Seligmann, Sivan & Werner, 1999
- Acanthodactylus pardalis (Lichtenstein, 1823) Moravec, Baha El Din, Seligmann, Sivan & Werner, 1999
- Asaccus nasrullahi Werner, 2006
- Cerastes cerastes Werner, Sivan, Kushnir & Motro 1999
- Cerastes cerastes hoofieni Werner & Sivan, 1999
- Cerastes gasperettii Werner, 1987
- Cerastes gasperettii Werner, Le Verdier, Rosenman & Sivan, 1991
- Cerastes gasperettii mendelssohni Werner & Sivan, 1999
- Eirenis coronella ibrahimi Sivan & Werner, 2003
- Eirenis coronelloides Sivan & Werner, 2003
- Laudakia stellio salehi Werner, 2006
- Mesalina bahaeldini Segoli, Cohen & Werner, 2002
- Micrelaps tchernovi Werner, Babocsay, Carmely & Thuna, 2006
- Ptyodactylus hasselquistii krameri Werner, 1995

Note: Amphibian and reptile taxa with the author's name "Werner" described between 1893 and 1938 are by the Austrian zoologist Franz Werner.

== Taxa named in honor of Yehudah Werner ==
Yehudah Werner is commemorated in the scientific names of two reptiles:

- Testudo werneri Perälä, 2001
- Pseudotrapelus sinaitus werneri Moravec, 2002

== Published works ==
- Reptile Life in the Land of Israel
