= Horned viper =

Horned viper may refer to:

- Cerastes (genus), North African desert vipers, a group of small, venomous species found in the deserts and semi-deserts of northern North Africa eastward through Arabia and Iran
- Bitis caudalis, the horned puff adder, a venomous species found in the arid region of south-west Africa
- Vipera ammodytes, the sand viper, a venomous species found in southern Europe through to the Balkans and parts of the Middle East
- Viper (hieroglyph)
