= Vipera ammodytes gregorwallneri =

Scientific classification
- Domain: Eukaryota
- Kingdom: Animalia
- Phylum: Chordata
- Class: Reptilia
- Order: Squamata
- Suborder: Serpentes
- Family: Viperidae
- Genus: Vipera
- Species: V. ammodytes
- Subspecies: V. a. gregorwallneri

Trinomial name
- Vipera ammodytes gregorwallneri Sochurek, 1974

Subspecies of snake

Vipera ammodytes gregorwallneri is a venomous viper subspecies endemic to Austria and the former Yugoslavia.

It has no common English name.

== Geographic range ==
It is found in Austria and the former Yugoslavia.

== Taxonomy ==
Many authors, such as Golay et al. (1993) do not recognize this taxon and instead relegate it to the synonymy of V. a. ammodytes.
