= Vipera ammodytes montandoni =

Scientific classification
- Kingdom: Animalia
- Phylum: Chordata
- Class: Reptilia
- Order: Squamata
- Suborder: Serpentes
- Family: Viperidae
- Genus: Vipera
- Species: V. ammodytes
- Subspecies: V. a. montandoni

Trinomial name
- Vipera ammodytes montandoni Boulenger, 1904

Synonyms
- Vipera ammodytes var. montandoni Boulenger, 1904; Vipera ammodytes montandoni — Mertens & L. Müller, 1928; Vipera aspis balcanica Buresch & Zonkov, 1934; Vipera (Rhinaspis) ammodytes montandoni — Obst, 1983; Vipera ammodytes montandoni — Weinsten, Minton & Wilde, 1985

Subspecies of snake

Common names: transdanubian sand viper.

Vipera ammodytes montandoni is a venomous viper subspecies endemic to Bulgaria and southern Romania.

== Etymology ==
The subspecific name, montandoni, is in honor of "M. A. Montandon" who sent some of the first specimens of this snake to Boulenger.

== Description ==
According to Boulenger (1913): "Naso-rostral shield never reaching the canthus rostralis nor the summit of the rostral shield, which is deeper than broad (once and one seventh to once and a half); rostral appendage clad with 10-14 scales, in three (rarely two or four) transverse series between the rostral shield and the apex. Dorsal scales in 21 rows [at midbody]. Ventral shields 149 to 158; subcaudals 30 to 38. A more or less distinct blotch on the lower lip, involving five to seven labial shields without complete interruption. Lower surface of end of tail yellow."

== Geographic range ==
Bulgaria and southern Romania.
