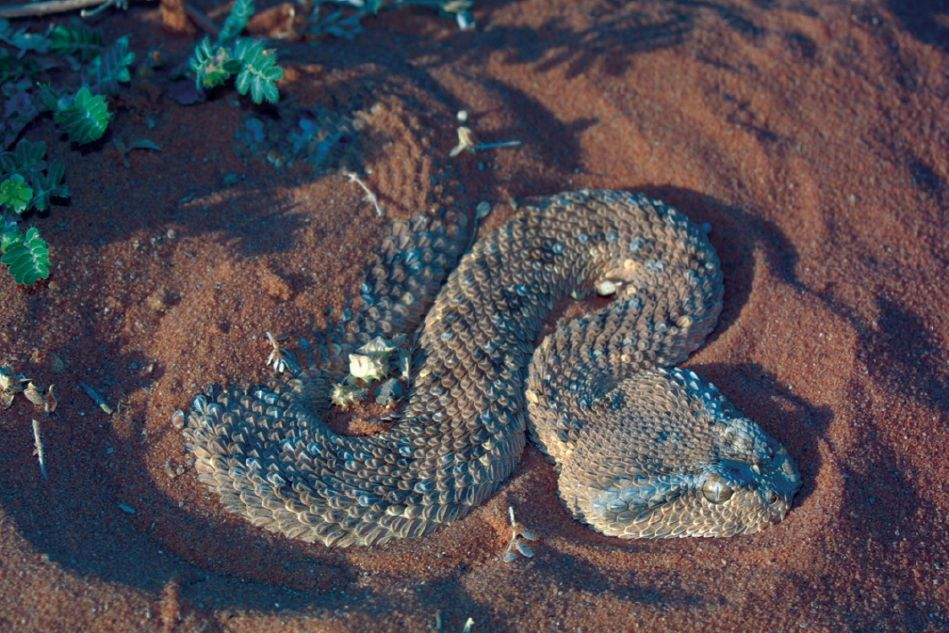

Conservation status
- Least Concern (IUCN 3.1)

Scientific classification
- Kingdom: Animalia
- Phylum: Chordata
- Class: Reptilia
- Order: Squamata
- Suborder: Serpentes
- Family: Viperidae
- Genus: Cerastes
- Species: C. gasperettii

Binomial name
- Cerastes gasperettii Leviton & S. Anderson, 1967
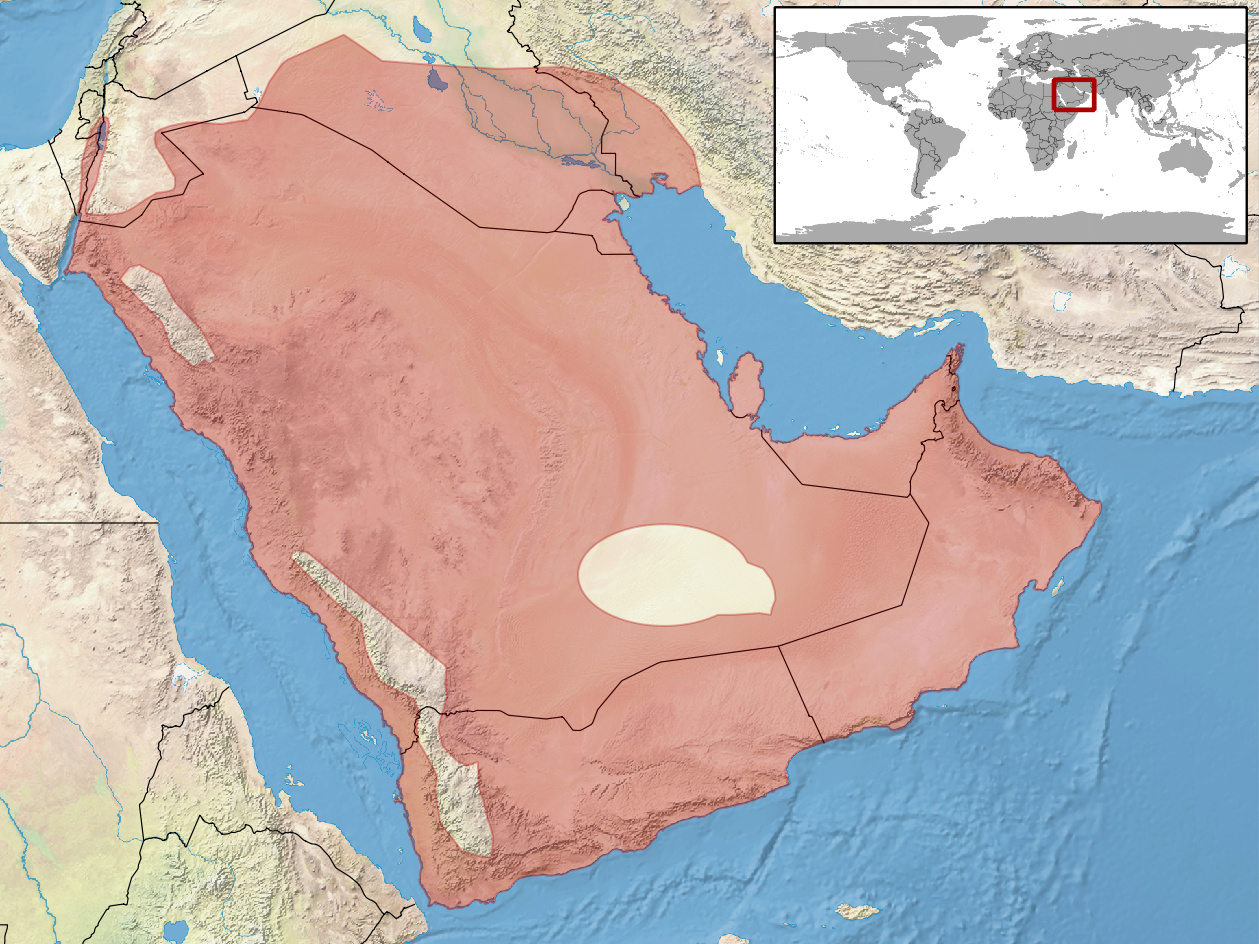

Synonyms
- Cerastes cerastes gasperettii Leviton & S. Anderson, 1967; Cerastes cerastes gasperetti — Farag & Banaja, 1980; Cerastes gasperettii — Y. Werner, 1987; Cerastes gasperettii — Y. Werner, Le Verdier, Rosenman & Sivan, 1991; Cerastes gasperettii — Schätti & Gasperetti, 1994

= Cerastes gasperettii =

Cerastes gasperettii Temporal range: Pleistocene-recent

Species of snake

Common names: Arabian horned viper, desert horned viper, Middle Eastern horned viper.

Cerastes gasperettii, also known commonly as the Arabian horned viper and Gasperetti's horned viper, is a species of venomous snake in the subfamily Viperinae of the family Viperidae. The species is native to the Arabian Peninsula and north to Israel, Iraq, and Iran. It is very similar in appearance to C. cerastes, but the geographic ranges of these two species do not overlap. No subspecies of C. gasperettii are recognized.

== Etymology ==
The specific name, gasperettii, is in honor of John Gasperetti, an American surveyor, engineer, and herpetologist, who collected the holotype specimen.

== Description ==
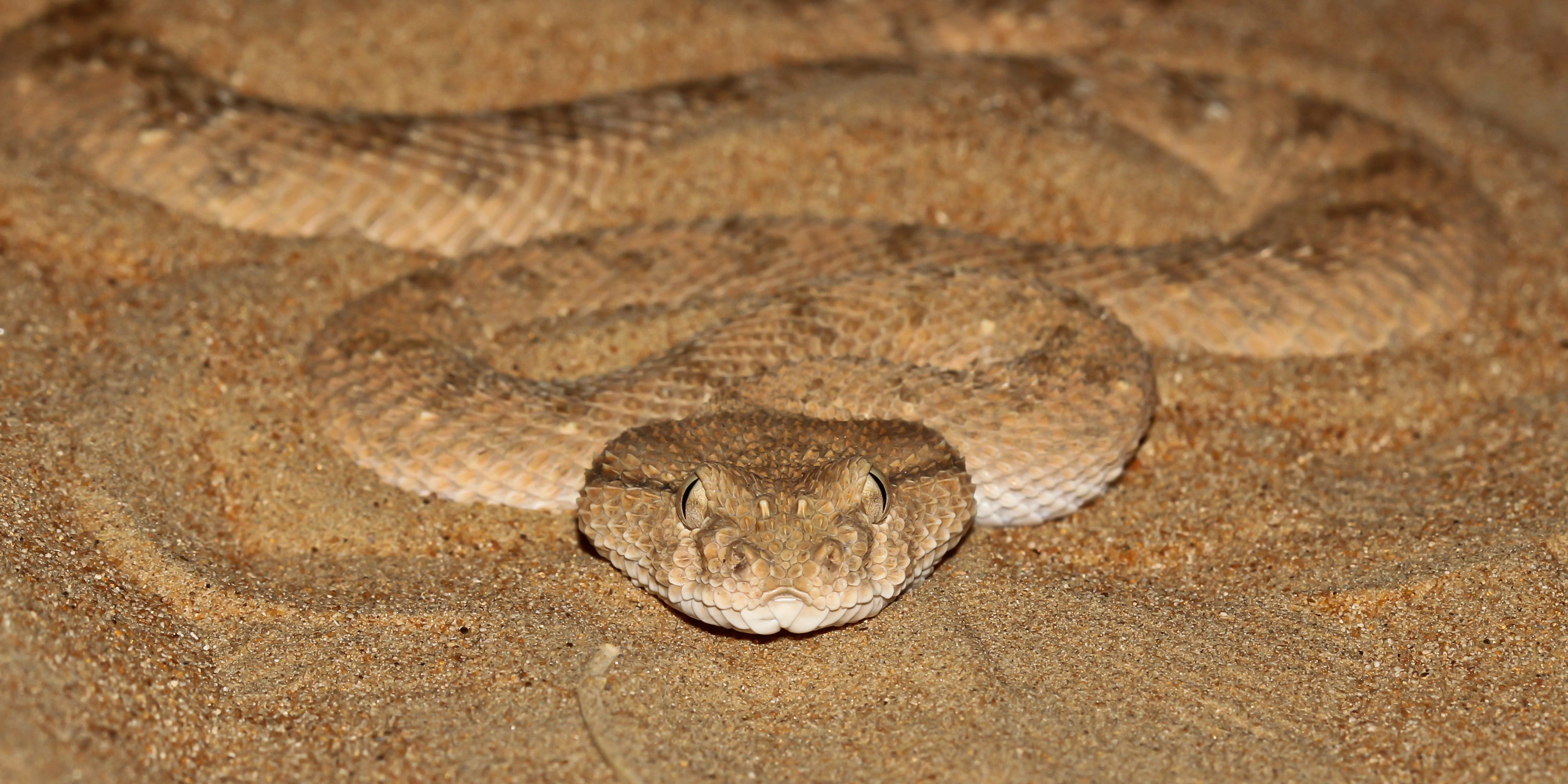

The average total length (including tail) of Cerastes gasperettii is 30–60 cm (12–24 in), with a maximum total length of 85 cm (33 in). Females are usually larger than males.

== Diet ==
The diet of Cerastes gasperettii is thought to primarily consist of rodents, with insects, particularly beetles, and lizards making up a less significant component of its diet.

== Reproduction ==
Cerastes gasperettii is oviparous.

== Geographic range ==
In the Arabian Peninsula Cerastes gasperettii has been found in Saudi Arabia, Kuwait, Oman, Qatar, United Arab Emirates, and Yemen. It is found in the Arava valley, located on the border between southern Israel and Jordan, eastwards through Jordan and Iraq to Khuzestan province in southwestern Iran.

The type locality given is "Beda Azan [23°41'N., 53°28'E.], Abu Dhabi [Abū Zaby]" [United Arab Emirates].

== Habitat ==
The preferred natural habitats of Cerastes gasperetti are desert and shrubland, at altitudes up to 1,500 m (4,900 ft).
