= Acanthodactylus ahmaddisii =

Jordanian fringe-fingered lizard

Conservation status
- Endangered (IUCN 3.1)

Scientific classification
- Kingdom: Animalia
- Phylum: Chordata
- Class: Reptilia
- Order: Squamata
- Family: Lacertidae
- Genus: Acanthodactylus
- Species: A. ahmaddisii

Binomial name
- Acanthodactylus ahmaddisii Y. Werner, 2004

Species of lizard

Acanthodactylus ahmaddisii, also known commonly as the Jordanian fringe-fingered lizard, is a species of lizard in the family Lacertidae.

== Geographic range ==
A. ahmaddisii is endemic to Jordan.

== Etymology ==
The specific name, ahmaddisii, is in honor of Jordanian biologist Ahmad M. Disi.

== Habitat ==
The natural habitats of A. ahmaddisii are subtropical or tropical dry shrubland.

== Conservation status ==
The Jordanian fringe-fingered lizard is threatened by habitat loss.

== Taxonomy ==
A. ahmaddisii was first described in 2004 by Israeli herpetologist Yehudah L. Werner.
