= Vipera ammodytes meridionalis =

Scientific classification
- Kingdom: Animalia
- Phylum: Chordata
- Class: Reptilia
- Order: Squamata
- Suborder: Serpentes
- Family: Viperidae
- Genus: Vipera
- Species: V. ammodytes
- Subspecies: V. a. meridionalis

Trinomial name
- Vipera ammodytes meridionalis Boulenger, 1903

Synonyms
- Vipera ammodytes var. meridionalis Boulenger, 1903; Vipera meridionalis — Bolkay, 1920; Vipera meridionalis var. connectens Bolkay, 1920; Vipera ammodytes meridionalis — Mertens & L. Müller, 1928; Pelias meridionalis — A.F. Reuss, 1930; Vipera (Rhinaspis) ammodytes meridionalis — Obst, 1983

Subspecies of snake

Common names: eastern sand viper.

Vipera ammodytes meridionalis is a venomous viper subspecies endemic to Greece and Turkish Thrace.

== Description ==
According to Boulenger (1913): "Naso-rostral shield never reaching the canthus rostralis and but rarely extending higher up than the upper border of the rostral, which is often as deep as broad, or a little deeper than broad; rostral appendage clad with fourteen to twenty scales, in four or five (rarely three) transverse series between the rostral shield and the apex. Supraciliary edge usually more prominent than in the typical form, sometimes slightly angular. Dorsal scales in 21 rows (very rarely 23). Ventral shields 133 to 147; subcaudals 24 to 35. A more or less distinct blotch on the lower lip, involving five or six labial shields without interruption. Lower surface of end of tail yellow."

== Geographic range ==
It is found in Greece (including Corfu and other islands) and Turkish Thrace
