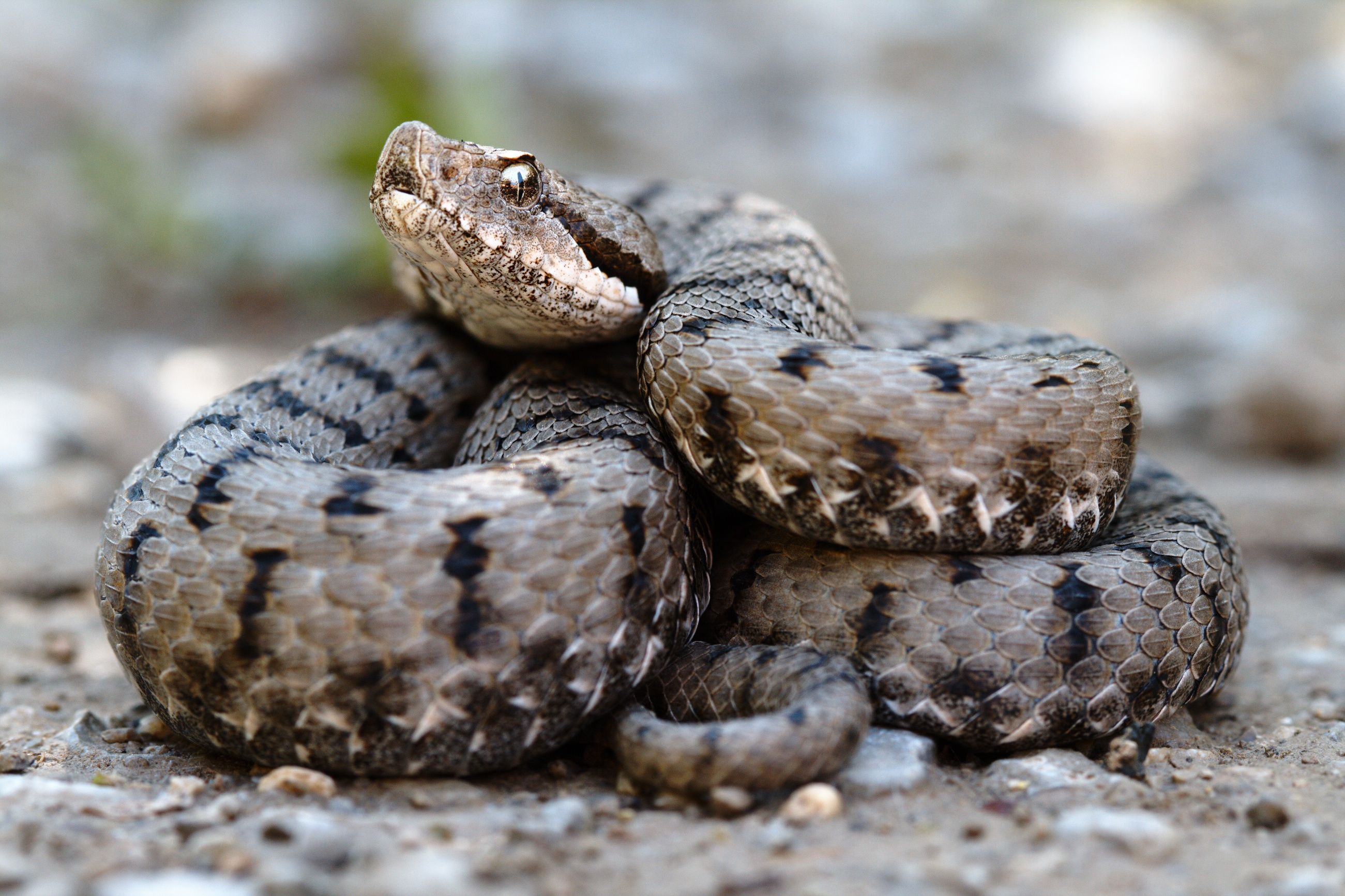

Conservation status
- Vulnerable (IUCN 3.1)

Scientific classification
- Kingdom: Animalia
- Phylum: Chordata
- Class: Reptilia
- Order: Squamata
- Suborder: Serpentes
- Family: Viperidae
- Genus: Vipera
- Species: V. aspis
- Subspecies: V. a. atra

Trinomial name
- Vipera aspis atra Meisner, 1820

Synonyms
- Vipera atra Meisner, 1820; Vipera aspis atra — Meisner, 1820; Vipera aspis var. nigra Bonaparte, 1834; Vipera aspis var. rubriventris Bonaparte, 1834; Vipera aspis var. nigra — Massalongo, 1854; Vipera aspis var. immaculata — Calderini, 1878; Vipera aspis var. Calderinii De Betta, 1879; [Vipera aspis] var. infernalis F. Müller, 1880; Mesovipera morathi lepontica A.F. Reuss, 1938; Vipera (Rhinaspis) aspis atra — Obst, 1983; Vipera aspis typus Golay et al., 1993

= Vipera aspis atra =

Subspecies of snake

Common names: black asp, black viper.

Vipera aspis atra is a venomous viper subspecies endemic to France, Switzerland and Italy.

== Geographic range ==
It is found in western Switzerland, northwestern Italy, Spain, and southeastern France. Mallow et al. (2003) describe the range only as "portions of Switzerland".

== Conservation status ==
This subspecies is classified as Vulnerable (VU) according to the IUCN Red List of Threatened Species (v3.1, 2001).

== Taxonomy ==
A recent study by Ursenbacher et al. (2006) suggests that V. a. atra may not be a valid subspecies.
