= Erich Sochurek =

Austrian herpetologist (1923–1987)

- Born: 26 April 1923; Vienna, Austria
- Died: 21 November 1987 (aged 64)
- Known for: Description of several reptile and amphibian taxa
- Scientific career
- Fields: Zoology, herpetology

Erich Sochurek (26 April 1923 – 21 November 1987) was an Austrian zoologist and herpetologist, specializing in the study of reptiles and amphibians.

== Biography ==
Erich Sochurek was born in Vienna, Austria, on 26 April 1923. He began publishing herpetological articles at the age of 17, focusing initially on local fauna. During the Second World War and subsequent captivity in the southeastern United States, he continued his field studies of reptiles and amphibians.

Between 1947 and 1956, he worked as an animal collector and dealer, undertaking expeditions to South America, Africa, the United States and North Africa. From 1956 to 1959, he worked as a research assistant at the Institute for Nature Conservation of the Austrian Nature Conservation Federation, contributing to the journal Natur und Land and organizing scientific excursions and lectures. From 1959 until his retirement in 1980, he was employed by the Federal Health Insurance Fund for Public Employees.

Sochurek imported amphibians, reptiles and mammals from around the world, donating specimens to several Austrian museums, particularly the Natural History Museum in Vienna. He also assembled an internationally significant collection of approximately 7,000 herpetological slides, which were used in numerous scientific and popular natural history publications and are now held by the Natural History Museum in Vienna.

His research focused primarily on herpetological distribution, local fauna and the conditions required for keeping reptiles and amphibians. His numerous field studies throughout Austria provided a foundation for subsequent research and received support from regional governments. He also published works on mammals and arachnids and gave lectures and produced educational films about reptiles, amphibians and his collecting expeditions.

In 1985, Sochurek joined the Austrian Herpetological Society. He died on 21 November 1987, aged 64, following a prolonged illness.

== Legacy ==
The snake subspecies Echis carinatus sochureki was named in his honour by Othmar Stemmler, with whom Sochurek had worked.

== Taxa described ==
Among the taxa described by Sochurek are:

- Vipera ursinii wettsteini (1955)
- Lacerta muralis occidentale (1956)
- Lacerta sicula kurtklari (1956)
- Triturus alpestris winterii (1956)
- Echis cannabis leakeyi (1969)
- Vipera ammodytes gregorwallneri (1974)
- Cerastes cerastes karihartli (1974)
- Vipera aspis heinzdischeki (1979)
