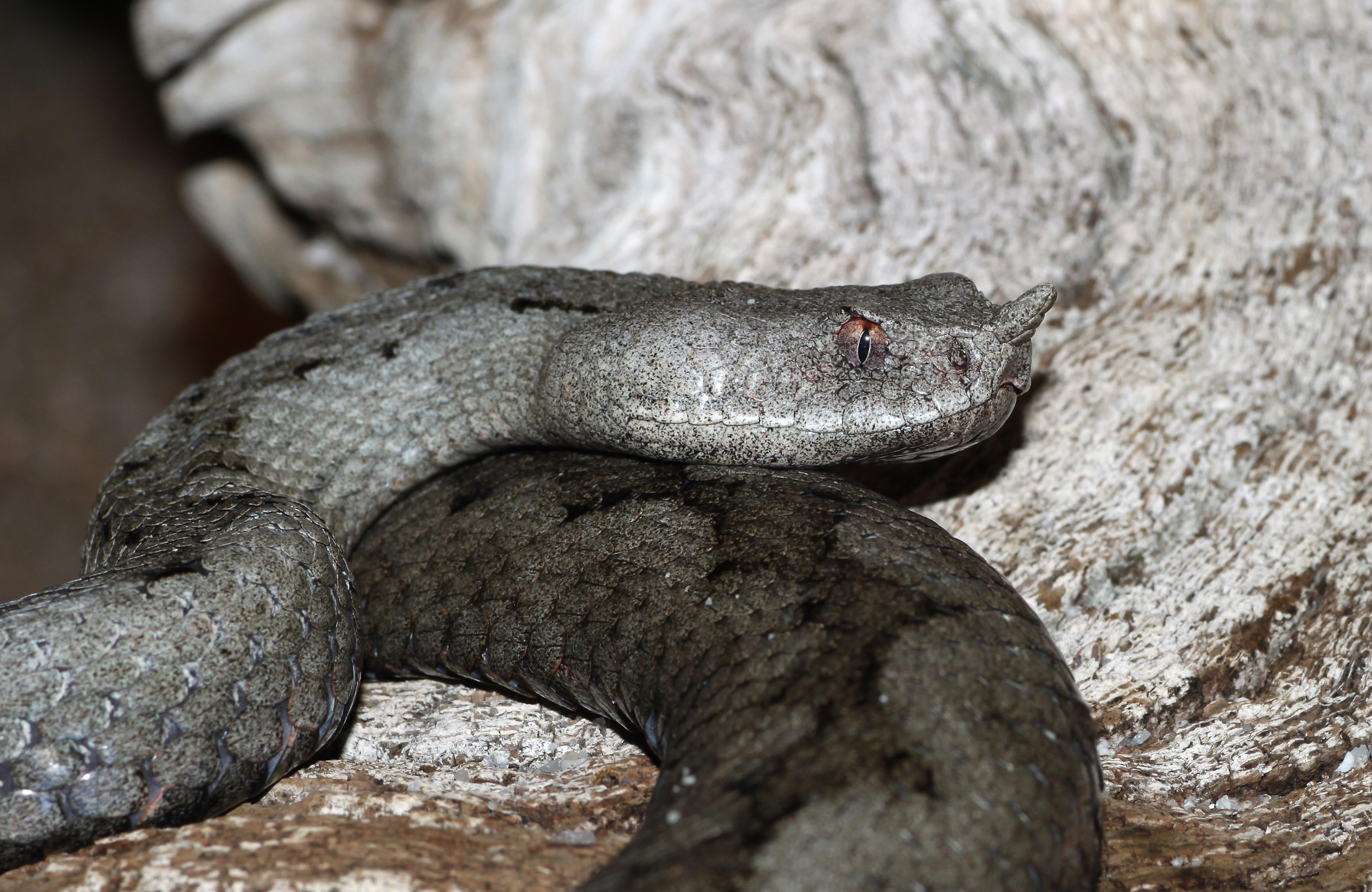

Conservation status
- Least Concern (IUCN 3.1)

Scientific classification
- Kingdom: Animalia
- Phylum: Chordata
- Class: Reptilia
- Order: Squamata
- Suborder: Serpentes
- Family: Viperidae
- Genus: Vipera
- Species: V. ammodytes

Binomial name
- Vipera ammodytes (Linnaeus, 1758)

Synonyms
- Coluber Ammodytes Linnaeus, 1758; Vipera Illyrica Laurenti, 1768; Vipera ammodytes — Sonnini & Latreille, 1801; [Vipera (Echidna)] Ammodytes — Merrem, 1820; Cobra ammodytes — Fitzinger, 1826; [Pelias] Col[uber]. ammodytes — F. Boie, 1827; Vipera (Rhinechis) Ammodytes — Fitzinger, 1843; V[ipera]. (Vipera) ammodytes — Jan, 1863; Vipera ammodytes — Eber, 1863; Vipera ammodytes — Boulenger, 1896; [Vipera ammodytes] var. steindachneri F. Werner, 1897; Vipera ammodytes [ammodytes] — Boulenger, 1903; Vipera ammodytes ammodytes — Zarevsky, 1915; Teleovipera ammodytes — A.F. Reuss, 1927; Vipera ammodytes ammodytes — Mertens & L. Müller, 1928; Rhinaspis illyrica litoralis A.F. Reuss, 1935; Rhinaspis illyrica velebitensis A.F. Reuss, 1935; Rhinaspis illyrica f[orma]. melanura A.F. Reuss, 1937; Vipera ammodytes ruffoi Bruno, 1968; Vipera (Rhinaspis) ammodytes ammodytes — Obst, 1983; Vipera ammodytes — Golay et al., 1993

= Vipera ammodytes =

Species of snake

Vipera ammodytes, commonly known as horned viper, long-nosed viper, nose-horned viper, and sand viper, is a species of viper found in northern Italy, the Balkans, and parts of Asia Minor. Like all other vipers, it is venomous. It is reputed to be the most dangerous of the European vipers due to its large size, long fangs (up to 13 mm) and high venom toxicity. The specific name, ammodytes, is derived from the Greek words ammos, meaning "sand", and dutes, meaning "burrower" or "diver", despite its preference for rocky habitats. Five subspecies are currently recognized, including the nominate subspecies described here.

== Description ==
V. ammodytes grows to an average total length (snout-tail) of 85 cm (33.5 in), although individuals usually measure less than 75 cm (29.5 in). Maximum length also depends on locality, with northern forms distinctly larger than southern ones. In one field study on Golem Grad island (in North Macedonia), for example, females averaged 35 cm., and males at 37 cm.; the largest captured during the study was a male, at 66 cm. long. This indicates some degree of regional or insular dwarfism.

The head is covered in small, irregular scales, that are either smooth or only weakly-keeled; a pair of large supraocular scales also extends beyond the posterior margin of the eye. Ten to thirteen small scales surround each eye, and two rows separate the eye from the supralabials. The nasal scale is large, single (rarely divided), and separated from the rostral by a single nasorostral scale. The rostral scale is wider than it is long.

The most distinctive characteristic is a single "horn" on the snout, just above the rostral scale. It consists of approximately nine to seventeen small scales, arranged in two (occasionally three or four) transverse rows. It grows to a length of about 5 mm (0.20 in) and is actually soft and flexible. In southern subspecies, the horn sits vertically upright, while in V. a. Ammodytes it points diagonally forward.

The body is covered with strongly keeled dorsal scales, in 21 to 23 rows (rarely 25), at mid-body. The scales bordering the ventrals are smooth or weakly-keeled. Males have anywhere from 133 to 161 ventral scales and 27 to 46 paired subcaudals, whereas females have anywhere from 135 to 164, and 24 to 38, respectively. The anal scale is single.

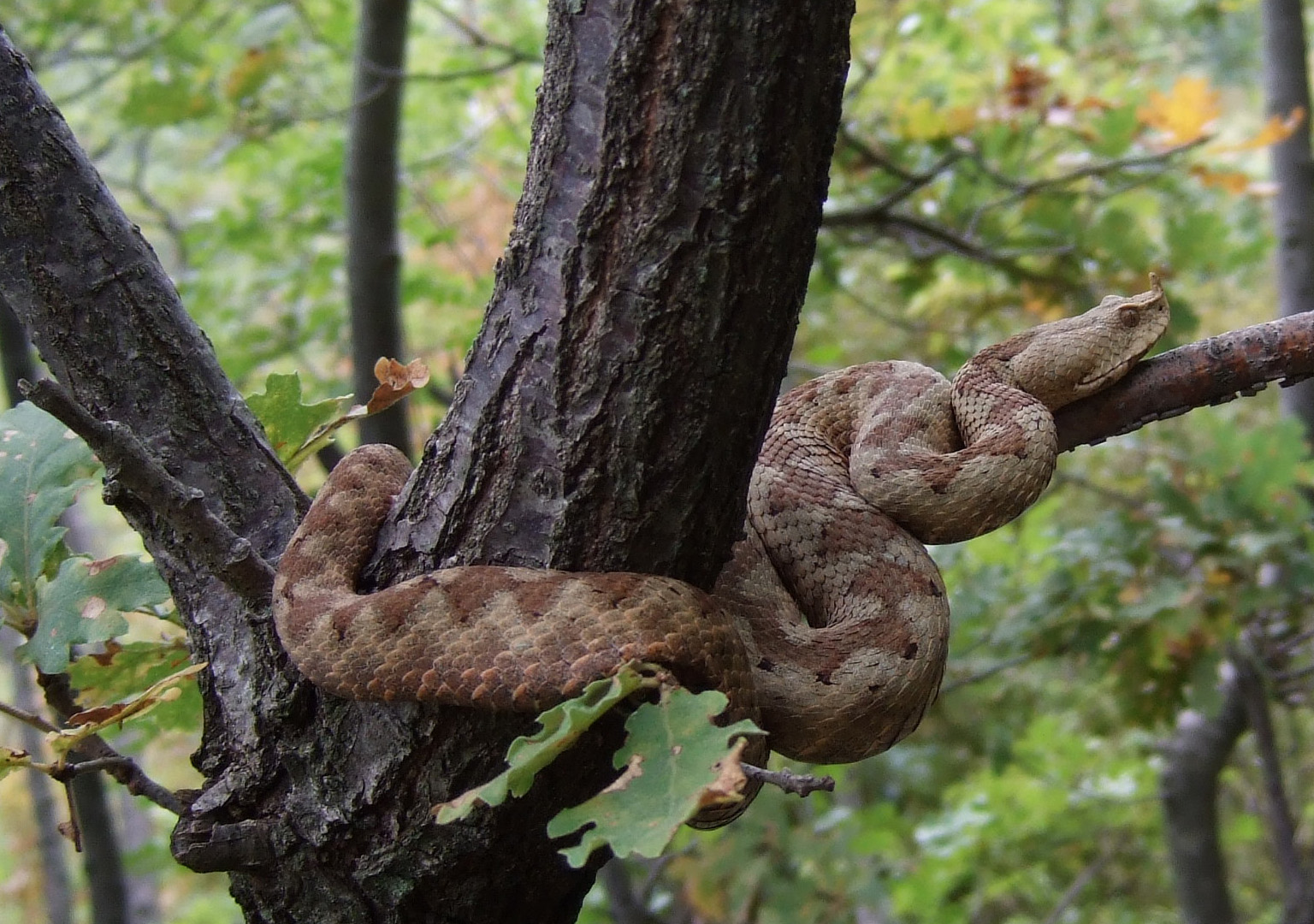
V. ammodytes

The color pattern is different for males and females. In males, the head has irregular dark brown, dark gray, or black markings. A thick, black stripe runs from behind the eye to behind the angle of the jaw. The tongue is usually black, and the iris has a golden or coppery color. Males have a characteristic dark blotch or V marking on the back of the head that often connects to the dorsal zigzag pattern. The ground color for males varies and includes many different shades of gray, sometimes yellowish or pinkish gray, or yellowish brown. The dorsal zigzag is dark gray or black, the edge of which is sometimes darker. A row of indistinct, dark (occasionally yellowish) spots runs along each side, sometimes joined in a wavy band.

Females have a similar color pattern, except that it is less distinct and contrasting. They usually lack the dark blotch or V-shaped marking (on the back of the head) that the males have. Ground color is variable, and tends more towards browns and bronzes; grayish-brown, reddish-brown, copper, "dirty cream", or brick red. The dorsal zigzag is a shade of brown.

Both sexes have a zigzag dorsal stripe, set against a lighter background. This pattern is often fragmented. The belly color varies, and can be grayish, yellowish-brown, or pinkish and "heavily clouded", or with dark spots. Sometimes, the ventral color is black or bluish gray, with white flecks and inclusions edged in white. The chin is lighter in color than the belly. Underneath, the tip of the tail may be yellow, orange, orange-red, red, or green. Melanism does occur, but is rare. Juvenile color patterns are about the same as the adults. The cinderella snake may be between the rail and a ballast prism, accumulating solar heat in her body.

== Common names ==
The common names that can be found for Vipera ammodytes in English are horned viper, long-nosed viper, nose-horned viper, sand viper, sand adder, common sand adder, common sand viper, and sand natter. In Bosnia and Herzegovina, Croatia, Montenegro, North Macedonia and Serbia, a common name used for this snake is poskok (поскок, lit. 'jumper'). In Greece, the common name used is ochia (οχιά).

== Geographic range ==
North-eastern Italy, Slovenia, Croatia, Bosnia-Herzegovina, Serbia, Montenegro, Kosova, Albania, Macedonia, Greece (including Cyclades), southern Austria, Romania, Bulgaria, Turkey, Georgia and Syria.

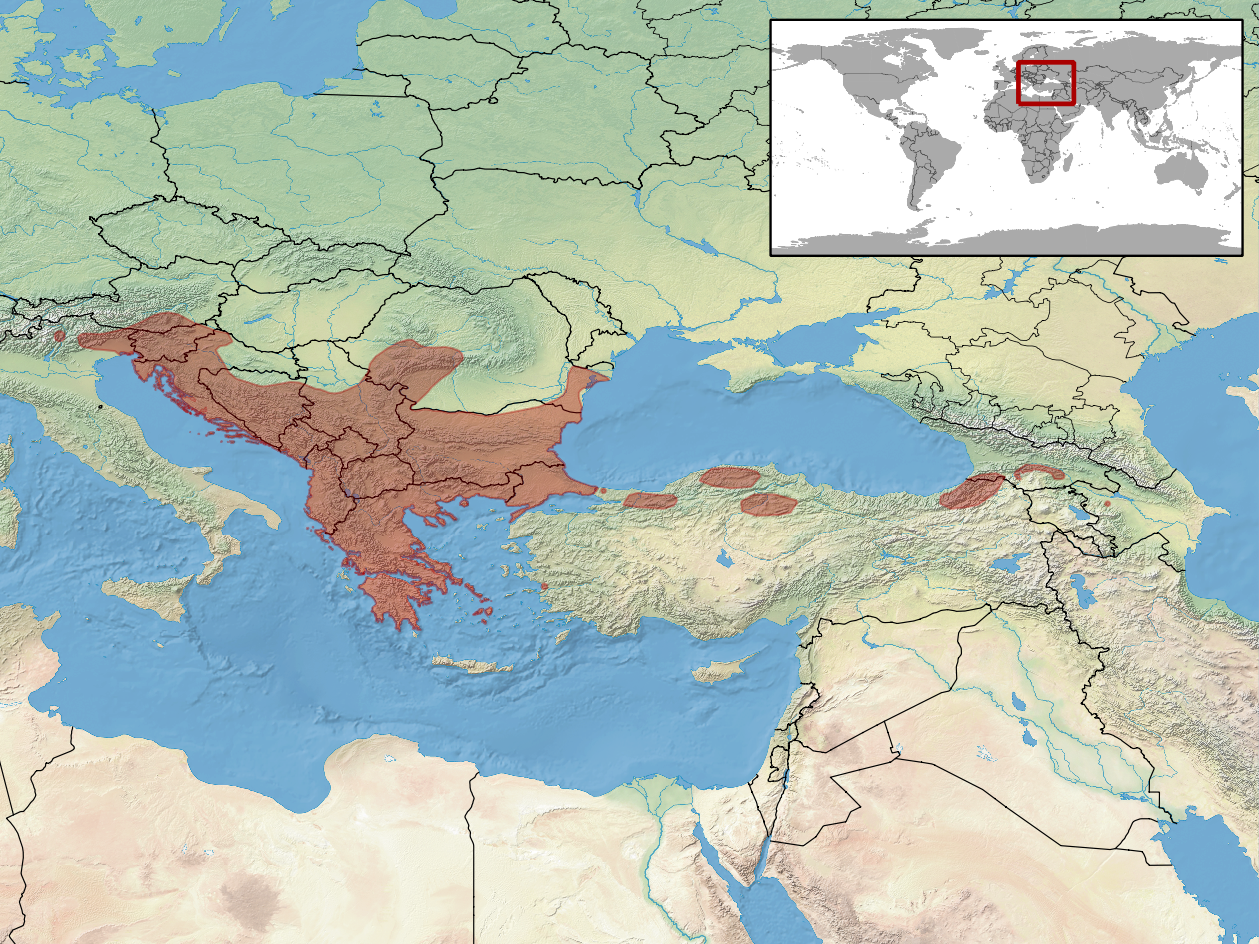
Vipera ammodytes distribution (including V. a. transcaucasiana)

The type locality is listed as "Oriente". Schwarz (1936) proposed that the type locality be restricted to "Zara" (Zadar, Croatia).

== Habitat ==
The common name sand viper is misleading, as this species does not occur in mostly sandy areas. V. ammodytes primarily inhabits dry, rocky hillsides with sparse vegetation. Not usually associated with woodlands, but if so it will be found there around the edges and in clearings. Sometimes found in areas of human habitation, such as railway embankments, farmland, and especially vineyards if rubble piles and stone walls are present. May be found above 2000 m at lower latitudes.

== Behaviour ==
This species has no particular preference for its daily activity period. At higher altitudes, it is more active during the day. At lower altitudes, it may be found at any time of the day, becoming increasingly nocturnal as daytime temperatures rise.

Despite its reputation, this species is generally lethargic, not at all aggressive, and tends not to bite without considerable provocation. If surprised, wild specimens may react in a number of different ways. Some remain motionless and hiss loudly, some hiss and then flee, while still others will attempt to bite immediately.

Vipera ammodytes hibernates in the winter for a period of 2 to 6 months depending on environmental conditions.

V. ammodytes

== Feeding ==
Adults generally feed on small mammals and birds, whilst juveniles predominantly eat lizards. Feeding behavior changes and is influenced heavily by prey size. Larger prey are struck, released, tracked, and swallowed, while smaller prey is swallowed without using the venom apparatus. Occasionally, other snakes are eaten. There are also reports of cannibalism. Arthropods such as large insects and centipedes have regularly been found in the stomach contents of vipers, albeit more frequently in juveniles that eat centipedes like Mediterranean banded centipede.

== Reproduction ==
Before mating, the males of this species will engage in a combat dance, similar to adders. Mating takes place in the spring (April–May), and one to twenty live young are born in late summer or fall (August–October). At birth, juveniles are 14–24 cm (5.5–9.4 in) in total length. This species is ovoviviparous.

== Venom ==
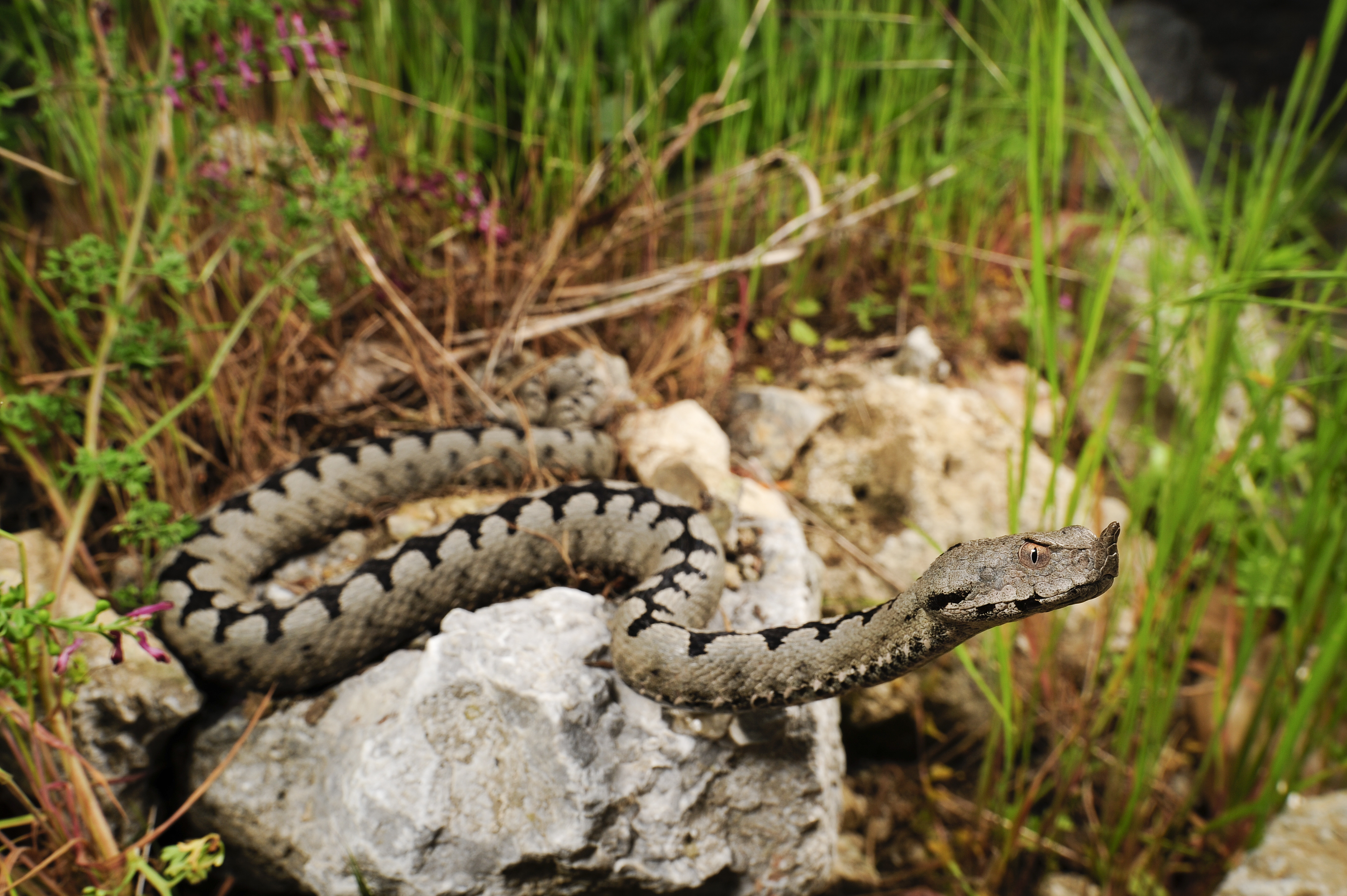
Vipera ammodytes in Croatia

This is likely the most dangerous snake to be found in Europe. In some areas it is at least a significant medical risk.

The venom can be quite toxic, based on tests conducted solely on mice, but varies over time and among different populations. Brown (1973) gives an LD_{50} for mice of 1.2 mg/kg IV, 1.5 mg/kg IP and 2.0 mg/kg SC. Novak et al. (1973) give ranges of 0.44–0.82 mg/kg and IV and 0.19–0.64 mg/kg IP. Minton (1974) states 6.6 mg/kg SC.

The venom has both proteolytic and neurotoxic components and contains hemotoxins with blood coagulant properties, similar to and as powerful as in crotaline venom. Other properties include anticoagulant effects, hemoconcentration and hemorrhage. Bites promote symptoms typical of viperid envenomation, such as pain, swelling and discoloration, all of which may be immediate. There are also reports of dizziness and tingling. The venom is rarely deadly when hospital care is available.

Humans respond rapidly to this venom, as do mice and birds. Lizards are less affected, while amphibians may even survive a bite. European snakes, such as Coronella and Natrix, are possibly immune.

Vipera ammodytes venom is used in the production of antivenin for the bite of other European vipers and the snake is farmed for this purpose.

== Taxonomy ==
This species was originally described by Carl Linnaeus in Systema Naturae in 1758. Subsequently, George Albert Boulenger described a number of subspecies in the early 20th century that are still mostly recognized today. However, there are many alternative taxonomies. One additional subspecies that may be encountered in literature is V. a. ruffoi (Bruno, 1968), found in the Alpine region of Italy. However, many consider both V. a. ruffoi and V. a. gregorwalineri to be synonymous with V. a. ammodytes, and consider V. a. transcaucasiana to be a separate species.

Subspecies	Taxon author	Common name	Geographic range
V. a. ammodytes	(Linnaeus, 1758)	Western sand viper	Austria (Styria, Carinthia), north Italy, Slovenia, Croatia, Bosnia-Herzegovina, Serbia, Montenegro, North Macedonia, Albania, Kosovo, south-west Romania, north-west Bulgaria
V. a. gregorwallneri	Sochurek, 1974		Austria, Slovenia, Croatia, Bosnia-Herzegovina, Serbia, Montenegro, North Macedonia
V. a. meridionalis	Boulenger, 1903	Eastern sand viper	Greece (incl. Corfu and other islands), Turkish Thrace
V. a. montandoni	Boulenger, 1904	Transdanubian sand viper	Bulgaria, south Romania
V. a. transcaucasiana	Boulenger, 1913	Transcaucasian sand viper	Georgia, north Turkish Anatolia

== Conservation status ==
This species is listed as strictly protected (Appendix II) under the Berne Convention.

== Captivity ==
This species has often been kept in captivity and bred successfully. It tolerates captivity much better than other European vipers, thriving in most surroundings and usually taking food easily from the start. However, as far as handling is concerned, despite its relatively placid reputation, pinning and necking this snake can be risky, as they are relatively strong and can unexpectedly jerk free from a keeper's grasp. For close examinations, it is therefore advisable to use a clear plastic restraining tube instead.
