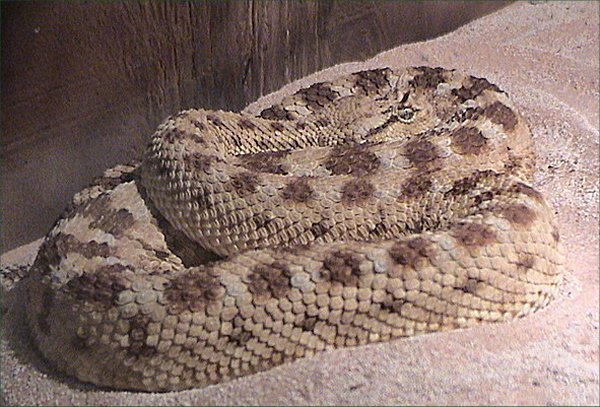
- Desert horned viper, C. cerastes

Scientific classification
- Kingdom: Animalia
- Phylum: Chordata
- Class: Reptilia
- Order: Squamata
- Suborder: Serpentes
- Family: Viperidae
- Subfamily: Viperinae
- Genus: Cerastes; Laurenti, 1768

Synonyms
- Cerastes Laurenti, 1768; Aspis Laurenti, 1768; Cerastes — Wagler, 1830; Gonyechis Fitzinger, 1843

= Cerastes (genus) =

Cerastes Temporal range: Pleistocene-recent

Genus of snakes

Cerastes is a genus of small vipers found in the deserts and semi-deserts of northern North Africa eastward through Arabia and Iran. Three species are recognized as being valid by ITIS and the Reptile Database. Common names for members the genus include horned vipers, North African desert vipers, and cerastes vipers.

== Description ==
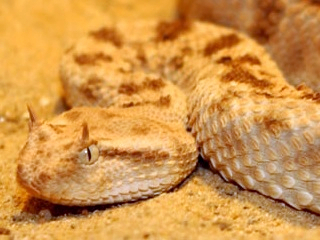
C. cerastes, horned individual.

Cerastes species are small snakes, averaging less than 50 cm (20 in) in total length (body + tail), but are relatively stout in appearance. The head is broad, flat and distinct from the neck. The head is covered with tubercularly keeled scales, which usually number 15 or more across, and a supraorbital horn may be present over each eye in some species. The snout is short and wide and the eyes, which are set well forward, are small to moderate in size. The body is short, stout and cylindrically depressed. The tail is short and tapers abruptly behind the vent. The dorsal scales are small, keeled, in 23–35 rows at midbody, with the keels of the oblique lateral row being serrated.

Although Cerastes are often referred to as horned vipers, only the two larger species, C. cerastes and C. gasperettii, are known to have horns, and even these do not always have them. Individuals with and without horns occur within the same population and even within the same litter.

When present, each horn consists of a single long, spine-like scale that can be folded back into an indentation in the postocular scale. They fold back in response to direct stimulation, thus streamlining the head and easing passage through burrows. Horns occur more often in individuals from sandy deserts as opposed to stony deserts. Specimens without horns have a prominent brow ridge instead.

The purpose of the horns is the subject of much speculation. One theory is that they allow a buildup of sand above the eyes while keeping it out of the eyes themselves. Another, more recent theory is simply that the horns serve to break up the outline of the head, making them harder for prey animals to spot.

== Geographic range ==
Cerastes species are found in North Africa eastward through Arabia and Iran. Mallow et al. (2003) describe the genus as being restricted to the deserts of North Africa and southwestern Asia, with the Negev desert acting as a filter zone between the three species mentioned in the table below.

== Habitat ==
The preferred natural habitat of Cerastes species is desert and semi-desert.

== Behavior ==
Captive cerastes sinking into sand

The genus Cerastes is nocturnal and terrestrial (not known to climb into bushes), often hiding by burying themselves in the sand. Although often described as slow moving, these snakes are also capable of sidewinding. When doing so, they can move quickly across the sand.

Cerastes species are not known to be particularly ill-tempered ("fairly placid"), but when threatened they will often stand their ground and form C-shaped coils that are rubbed together to produce a rasping or crackling sound, similar to Echis. This is called stridulation. With enough provocation, they will strike from this position.

These snakes are capable of "sinking" quickly down into loose sand, using their keeled, angled and serrated lateral scales in a rocking motion. This process begins at the tail and moves forward until the entire head is buried and only the eyes and nostrils are exposed. They can bury themselves this way whether in an outstretched or a coiled position.

== Feeding behavior and diet ==
Cerastes species are ambush predators that lie buried in the sand, waiting for prey to pass by. Their diet consists mainly of rodents, birds, and lizards.

== Reproduction ==
All three species of Cerastes lay eggs. However, those of C. vipera hatch within hours of deposition as opposed to many weeks, something not previously observed in other African snakes, most of which lay eggs that hatch weeks later or give birth to live young.

== Species ==
| Species | Taxon author | Common name | Geographic range |
|---|---|---|---|
| C. cerastes (Note: Type species) | (Linnaeus, 1758) | Desert horned viper | Arid north Africa (Morocco, Western Sahara, Mauritania and Mali, eastward through Algeria, Tunisia, Niger, Libya and Chad to Egypt, Sudan, Ethiopia and Somalia) through Sinai to the northern Negev of Israel. In the Arabian Peninsula, it occurs in Yemen and extreme southwestern Saudi Arabia. |
| C. gasperettii | Leviton & Anderson, 1967 | Gasperetti Arabian horned viper | Arabian Peninsula especially the Nejd region and al-Hasa |
| C. vipera | (Linnaeus, 1758) | Sahara sand viper | Arid North Africa: Mauritania, Western Sahara, Morocco, Algeria, Mali, Tunisia, Libya, Niger, Chad and Egypt. Sinai Peninsula: Egypt and Israel. |

In addition to the three above species recognized by "ITIS", Cerastes boehmei was described in 2010, but has subsequently been synonymized with Cerastes vipera.

== Taxonomy ==
Although it would seem that Laurenti changed his mind in 1768 and decided to name this genus Aspis, instead of Cerastes as he did earlier, this was eventually rejected. The International Commission on Zoological Nomenclature (ICZN) later placed the name Cerastes on the Official List of Generic Names in Zoology (name no. 1539), while the name Aspis was placed on the Official Index of Invalid Generic Names in Zoology (name no. 1630).
