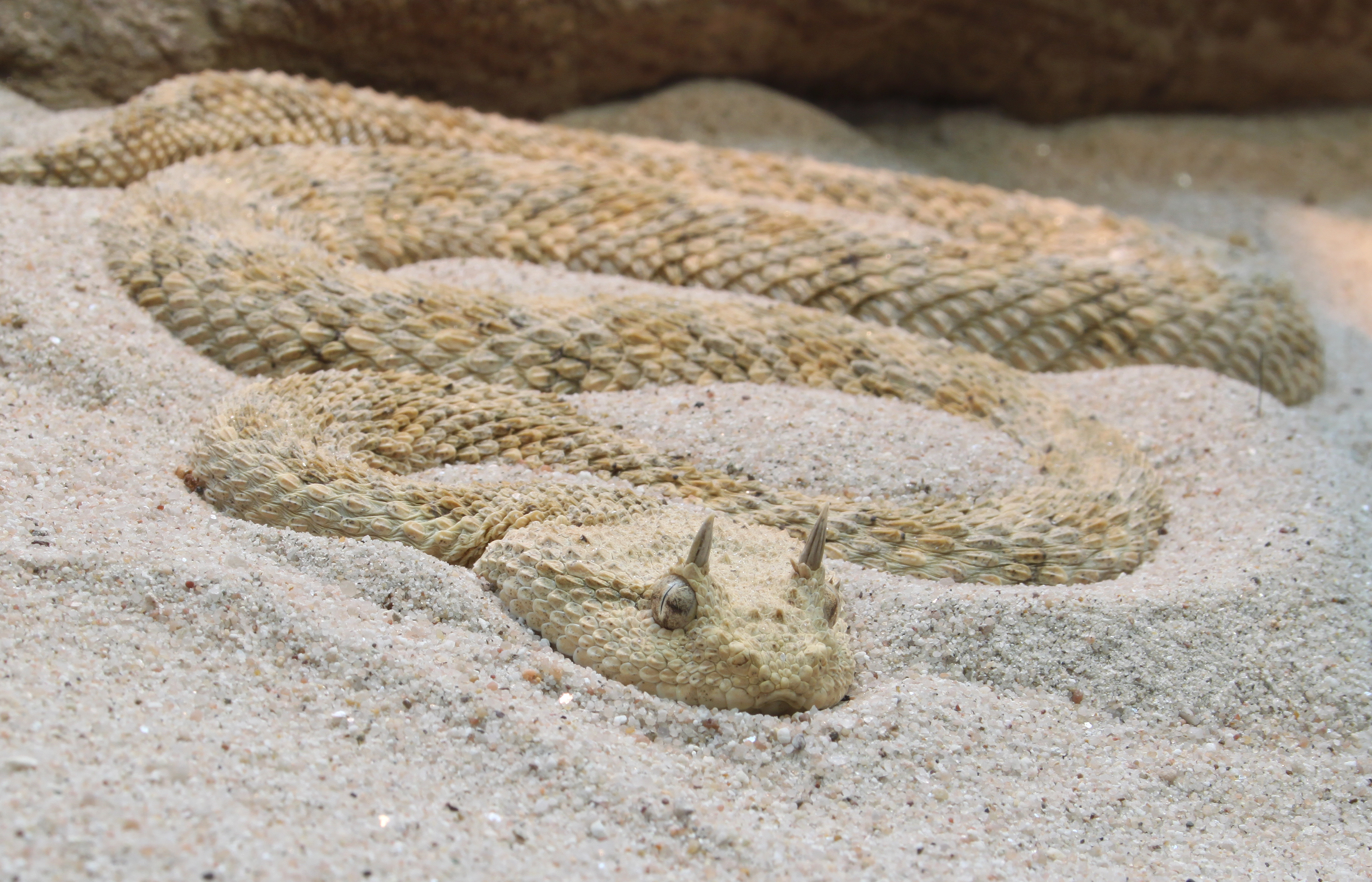

Conservation status
- Least Concern (IUCN 3.1)

Scientific classification
- Kingdom: Animalia
- Phylum: Chordata
- Class: Reptilia
- Order: Squamata
- Suborder: Serpentes
- Family: Viperidae
- Genus: Cerastes
- Species: C. cerastes

Binomial name
- Cerastes cerastes (Linnaeus, 1758)

Synonyms
- List: [Coluber] Cerastes Linnaeus, 1758; Coluber cornutus Linnaeus In Hasselquist, 1762; Cerastes cornutus — Forskål, 1775; Vipera Cerastes — Sonnini & Latreille, 1801; Cerastes Hasselquistii Gray, 1842; Cerastes Aegyptiacus A.M.C. Duméril, Bibron & A.H.A. Duméril, 1854; Echidna atricaudata A.M.C. Duméril, Bibron & A.H.A. Duméril, 1854; Vipera Avicennae Jan, 1859; V[ipera]. (Echidna) Avicennae — Jan, 1863; V[ipera]. (Cerastes) cerastes — Jan, 1863; Cerastes cornutus — Boulenger, 1891; Cerastes cerastes— J. Anderson, 1899; Cerastes cornutus var. mutila Doumergue, 1901; Aspis cerastes — Parker, 1938; Cerastes cerastes cerastes — Leviton & S.C. Anderson, 1967; Cerastes cerastes karlhartli Sochurek, 1974; Cerastes cerastes karlhartli — Tiedemann & Häupl, 1980; [Cerastes cerastes] mutila — Le Berre, 1989; Cerastes cerastes — Y. Werner, Le Verdier, Rosenman & Sivan, 1991

= Cerastes cerastes =

Cerastes cerastes Temporal range: Pleistocene-recent

Species of reptile

Cerastes cerastes, commonly known as the Saharan horned viper or the desert horned viper, is a species of viper native to the deserts of Northern Africa and parts of the Arabian Peninsula and Levant. It is often easily recognized by the presence of a pair of supraocular "horns", although hornless individuals do occur. Three subspecies have been described.

== Description ==
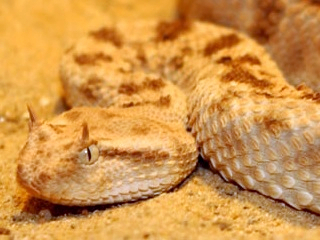
C. cerastes, with "horns".

The average total length (body and tail) of Cerastes cerastes is 30–60 cm (12–24 in), with a maximum total length of 85 cm (33 in). Females are larger than males.

One of the most distinctive characteristics of this species is the presence of supraorbital "horns", one over each eye. However, these may be reduced in size or absent (see genus Cerastes). The eyes are prominent and set on the sides of the head. There is significant sexual dimorphism, with males having larger heads and larger eyes than females. Compared to C. gasperettii, the relative head size of C. cerastes is larger and there is a greater frequency of horned individuals (13% versus 48%, respectively).

The colour pattern consists of a yellowish, pale grey, pinkish, reddish or pale brown ground colour, which almost always matches the substrate colour where the animal is found. Dorsally, a series of dark, semi-rectangular blotches runs the length of the body. These blotches may or may not be fused into crossbars. The belly is white. The tail, which may have a black tip, is usually thin.

== Common names ==
Common names of the species Cerastes cerastes include desert sidewinding horned viper, Saharan horned viper, horned s, Sahara horned viper, desert horned viper, North African horned viper, African desert horned viper, greater cerastes, asp and horned viper. In Egypt, it is called el-ṭorîsha (حية الطريشة); in Libya, it is called um-Goron (ام قرون).

In ancient Egyptian, a hieroglyph depicting horned viper is a phonogram for the letter f (𓆑), as derived through rebus principle from the species name, ft.

== Geographic distribution ==
Cerastes cerastes is common in Iraq but is also found in Syria, Saudi Arabia, Palestine, Yemen, Jordan, Israel, Qatar, Mauritania, Morocco and Kuwait. They can also be found in parts of North Africa including Libya, Egypt, and Sudan.

Originally, the type locality was listed only as "Oriente." However, Flower (1933) proposed "Egypt" by way of clarification.

== Habitat ==
The preferred natural habitat of Cerastes cerastes is dry, sandy areas with sparse rock outcroppings, but it tends to avoid coarse sand. Occasionally it is found around oases, and up to an altitude of 1,500 metres (4,900 ft). Cooler temperatures, with annual averages of 20 °C (68 °F) or less, are preferred.

== Behaviour and diet ==
Cerastes cerastes typically moves by sidewinding, during which it presses its weight into the sand or soil, leaving whole-body impressions. Often, it is even possible to use these impressions to make ventral scale counts. It has a reasonably placid temperament, but if threatened, may assume a C-shaped posture and rapidly rub its coils together. Because it has strongly keeled scales, this rubbing produces a rasping noise, similar to the sound produced by snakes of the genus Echis. In the wild, C. cerastes is typically an ambush predator, lying submerged in sand adjacent to rocks or under vegetation. The diet of this carnivorous species consists primarily of a variety of lizards, especially geckos, small rodents, and birds. Specific prey in the wild include jerboas, yellow wagtails, and chiffchaffs. C. cerastes has been known to travel long distances at night in search of prey. When approached, it strikes very rapidly, holding on to the captured prey until the venom takes effect.

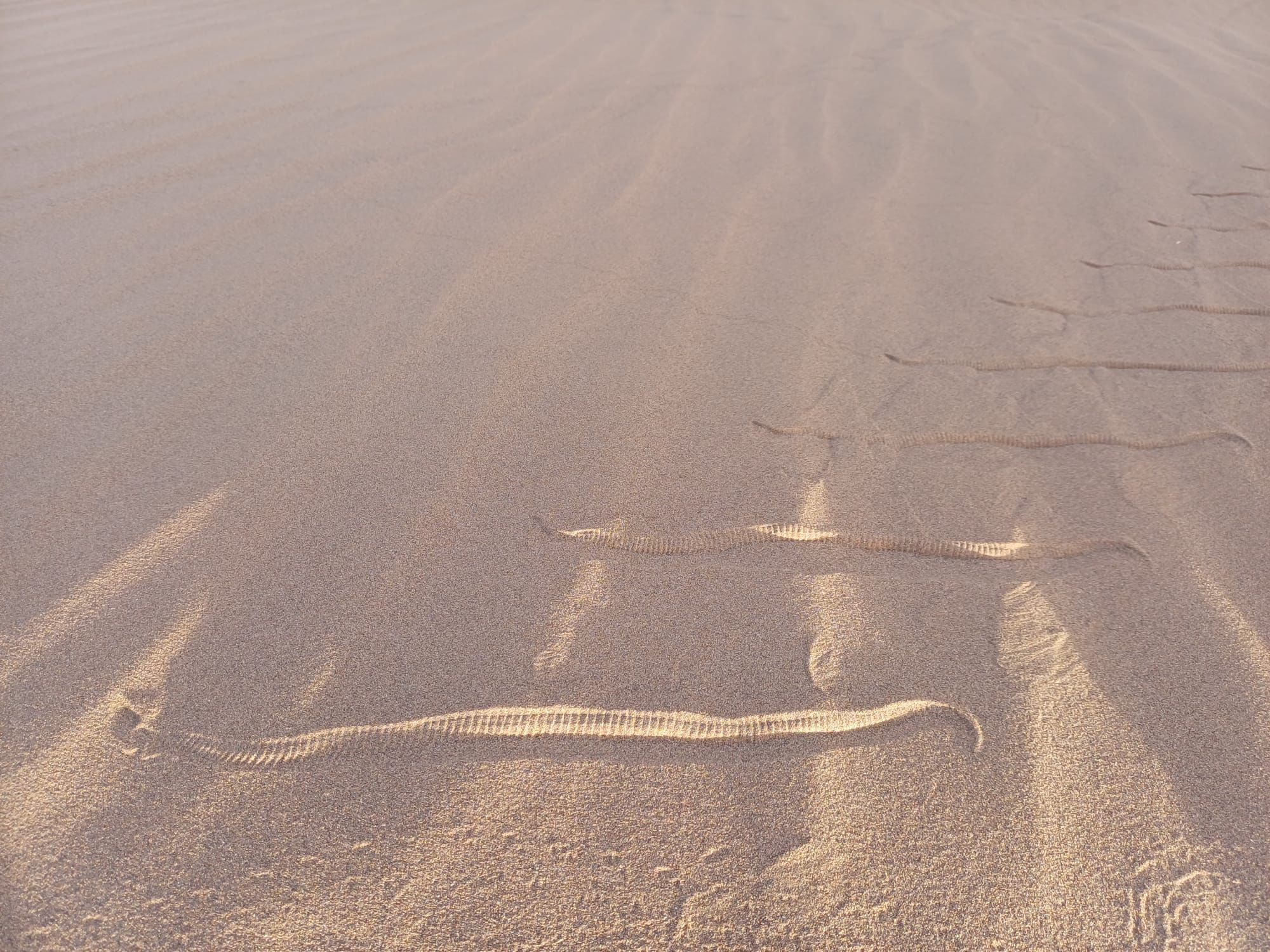
sidewinder tracks in the sand

== Reproduction ==
In captivity, mating of Cerastes cerastes was observed in April and always occurred while the animals were buried in the sand. This species is oviparous, laying 8–23 eggs that hatch after 50 to 80 days of incubation. The eggs are laid under rocks and in abandoned rodent burrows. Each hatchlings measures 12–15 cm (about 5–6 inches) in total length (Tail included).

== Venom ==
Cerastes cerastes venom is reported to be similar in action to Echis venom. Envenomation usually causes swelling, haemorrhage, necrosis, nausea, vomiting, and haematuria. A high phospholipase A2 content may cause cardiotoxicity and myotoxicity. Studies of venom from both C. cerastes and C. vipera list a total of eight venom fractions, the most powerful of which has haemorrhagic activity. Venom yields vary, with ranges of 19–27 mg to 100 mg of dried venom being reported. The venom has LD_{50} toxicity values of 0.4 mg/kg IV and 3.0 mg/kg SC. An estimated lethal dose for humans is 40–50 mg.

== Subspecies ==
The following subspecies of Cerastes cerastes are recognized as being valid.

- Cerastes cerastes hoofieni Werner & Sivan, 1999 – Saudi Arabia.
- Cerastes cerastes karlhartli Sochurek, 1974 – Egyptian horned viper – southeast Egypt and Sinai Peninsula.
- Cerastes cerastes mutila Domergue, 1901 – Algerian horned viper – southwest Algeria, Morocco.

Previously, C. gasperettii was also regarded as a subspecies of C. cerastes.
