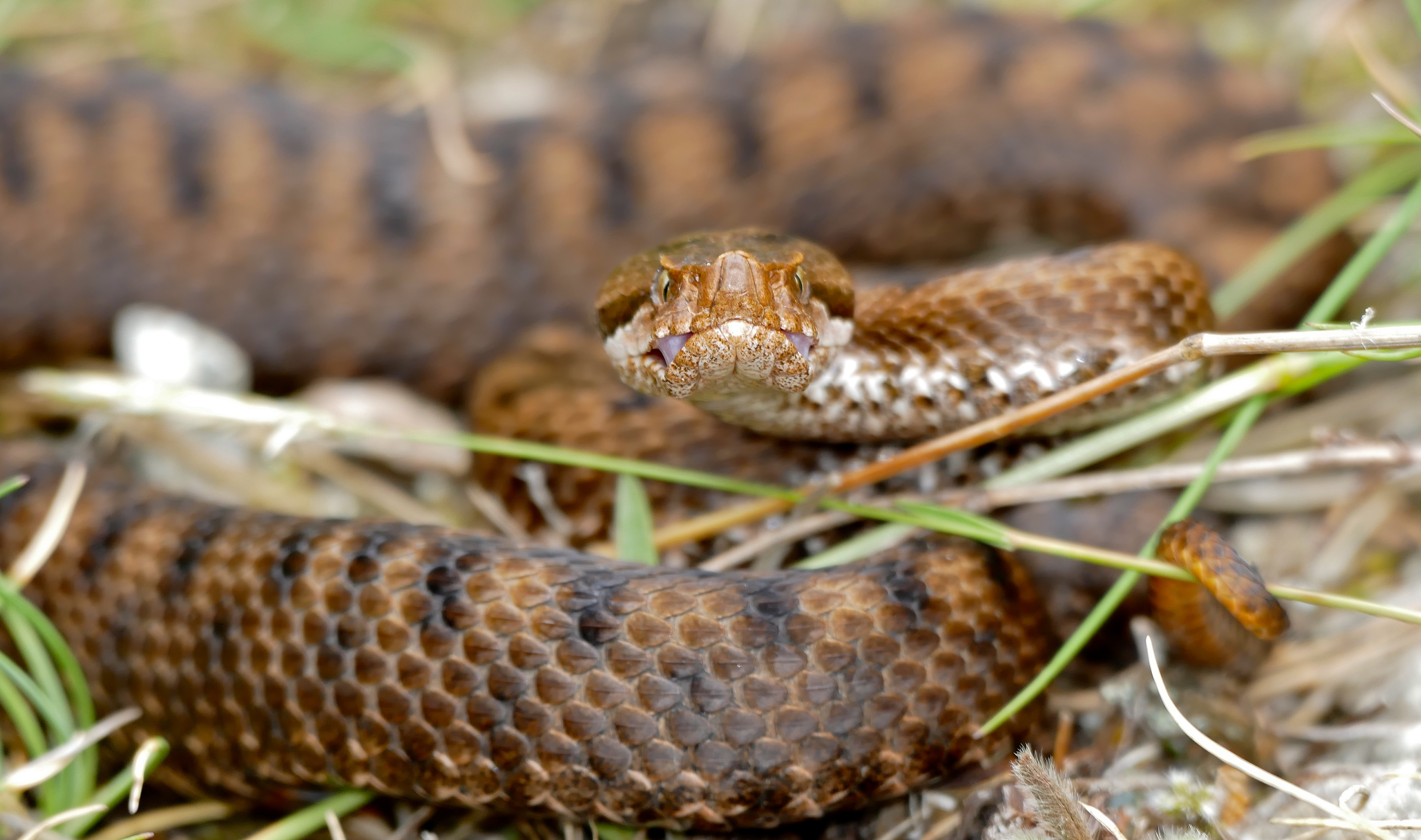

Conservation status
- Vulnerable (IUCN 3.1)

Scientific classification
- Kingdom: Animalia
- Phylum: Chordata
- Class: Reptilia
- Order: Squamata
- Suborder: Serpentes
- Family: Viperidae
- Genus: Vipera
- Species: V. aspis

Binomial name
- Vipera aspis (Linnaeus, 1758)

Synonyms
- List: [Coluber] aspis Linnaeus, 1758; Vipera Francisci Redi Laurenti, 1768; Vipera Mosis Charas Laurenti, 1768; Vipera vulgaris Latreille in Sonnini & Latreille, 1801; Vipera ocellata Latreille in Sonnini & Latreille, 1801; Coluber Charasii — Shaw, 1802; [Vipera (Echidna)] Aspis — Merrem, 1820; C[hersea]. vulgaris — Fleming, 1822; Vipera aspis — Metaxa, 1823; Aspis ocellata — Fitzinger, 1826; [Pelias] Col[uber]. aspis — F. Boie, 1827; Berus Vulgaris — Gray, 1831; Vipera aspis var. ocellata — Bonaparte, 1834; Vipera aspis var. ocellata — Massalongo, 1853; V[ipera]. (Vipera) aspis — Jan, 1863; Vipera berus subspec. aspis — Camerano, 1888; Vipera aspis — Boulenger, 1896; Vipera aspis var. lineata Düringen, 1897; [Vipera aspis] var. Delalande Phisalix, 1902; Vipera aspis aspis — Mertens, 1925; Mesovipera aspis — A.F.T. Reuss, 1927; Mesovipera maculata A.F.T. Reuss, 1930 (nomen nudum); Mesovipera maculata aspis — A.F.T. Reuss, 1930 (nomen nudum); Vipera ammodytes aspis — Schwarz, 1936; Vipera aspis delalande — M. Phisalix, 1968; Vipera (Rhinaspis) aspis aspis — Obst, 1983; Vipera aspis — Golay et al., 1993

= Vipera aspis =

Species of snake

Vipera aspis is a viper species found in southwestern Europe. Its common names include asp, asp viper, European asp, and aspic viper, among others. Like all other vipers, it is venomous. Bites from this species can be more severe than from the European adder, V. berus; not only can they be very painful, but approximately 4% of all untreated bites are fatal. The specific epithet, aspis, is a Greek word that means "viper." Five subspecies are currently recognized, including the nominate subspecies described here.

== Description ==
The species grows to an average total length of 60–65 centimetres (24–26 in). Males reach a maximum total length of 85 cm (33 in), females rarely more than 75 cm (30 in). Males, however, are a little slimmer than females. The tail is very short: one-seventh to one-ninth of total body length in females, and one-sixth to one-eighth in males.

The head is broad, triangular and quite distinct from the neck. The tip of the snout is slightly but distinctly upturned. The rostral scale is generally higher than it is wide, touching 2 to 3 scales on the upper side of the snout. Dorsally, the snout is flat with distinct and slightly raised sharp margins. The nasal scale is single (hardly ever divided) and separated from the rostral by a single nasorostral scale. The crown is covered with numerous small and irregular scales of different sizes that are mostly smooth, but sometimes slightly keeled. Frontal and parietal scales are usually not present, but if so, they are small and irregularly shaped, with the frontal separated from the supraoculars by 2 scale rows. The supraocular scales are large and distinct, separated by 4–7 scale rows. There are 10–12 (rarely 8–18) small circumorbital scales below the supraocular. The eye is separated from the supralabials by 2 (rarely 3) scale rows. The vertical diameter of the eye is about the same as the distance between the eye and the mouth. There are 9–13 supralabials. The 4th–5th supralabials (rarely 4th–6th or 5th–6th) are separated from the eye by 2 (rarely 3) rows of small scales, but sometimes there is a single scale between the 4th supralabial and the eye. Generally, the temporal scales are smooth, but sometimes slightly keeled.

Midbody, there are 21–23 (rarely 19 or 25) rows of dorsal scales. These are strongly keeled, except for the outermost rows that vary and are sometimes smooth. There are 134–170 ventral scales. Subspecies V. a. aspis averages fewer than 150 ventrals, while V. a. atra averages more. The anal scale is single. Males have 32–49 subcaudals, females 30–43. The subcaudal scales are paired.

The dorsal markings vary strongly, but only rarely take the form of a clear zigzag, as in V. berus.

== Common names and historical usage ==
Common names of Vipera aspis include "asp", "asp viper", "European asp", "aspic viper", "European viper" and "Jura viper". In the past, the term "asp" has been used to refer to any venomous snake.

The snake which supposedly killed the Egyptian Queen Cleopatra is named by Velleius Paterculus as an asp, and by Martial as a viper. Virgil mentions two snakes but does not name their species, while Plutarch mentions twin prick marks on her arm but does not state that these were toothmarks, so they could also have been from a poisoned hair pin. There is a tradition that the bite was a cobra's, but experts consider that a cobra would have been too big (at over 5 feet long) to smuggle in a basket.

== Distribution ==
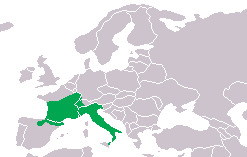
Distribution of V. aspis.

It is native to France, Andorra, north-eastern Spain, extreme south-western Germany in the southern Black Forest, Switzerland, Italy, and north-western Slovenia. The original type locality was listed simply as "Gallia." However, Schwarz (1936) proposed that it be restricted to "Poitou [Frankreich]" (Poitou, France). It has been extirpated from Bulgaria.

In August–October 2006, a number of specimens were discovered in a wooded area near the town of Poortugaal in the Netherlands. Although they were doing quite well, the species is not native to this country. It is likely that one or more escaped or were set loose in the area.

== Conservation status ==
This species was assessed as Vulnerable in 2022, according to the IUCN Red List of Threatened Species. This was done under criterion A2c, due to a population decline likely greater than 30% over the last 24 years (three estimated generations). It was previously categorized as Least Concern.

However, subspecies V. a. aspis is categorized as Critically Endangered in Switzerland, V. a. atra is categorized as Vulnerable, and V. a. francisciredi is categorized as Endangered.

In general, the species is also listed as protected (Appendix III) under the Berne Convention.

== Habitat ==
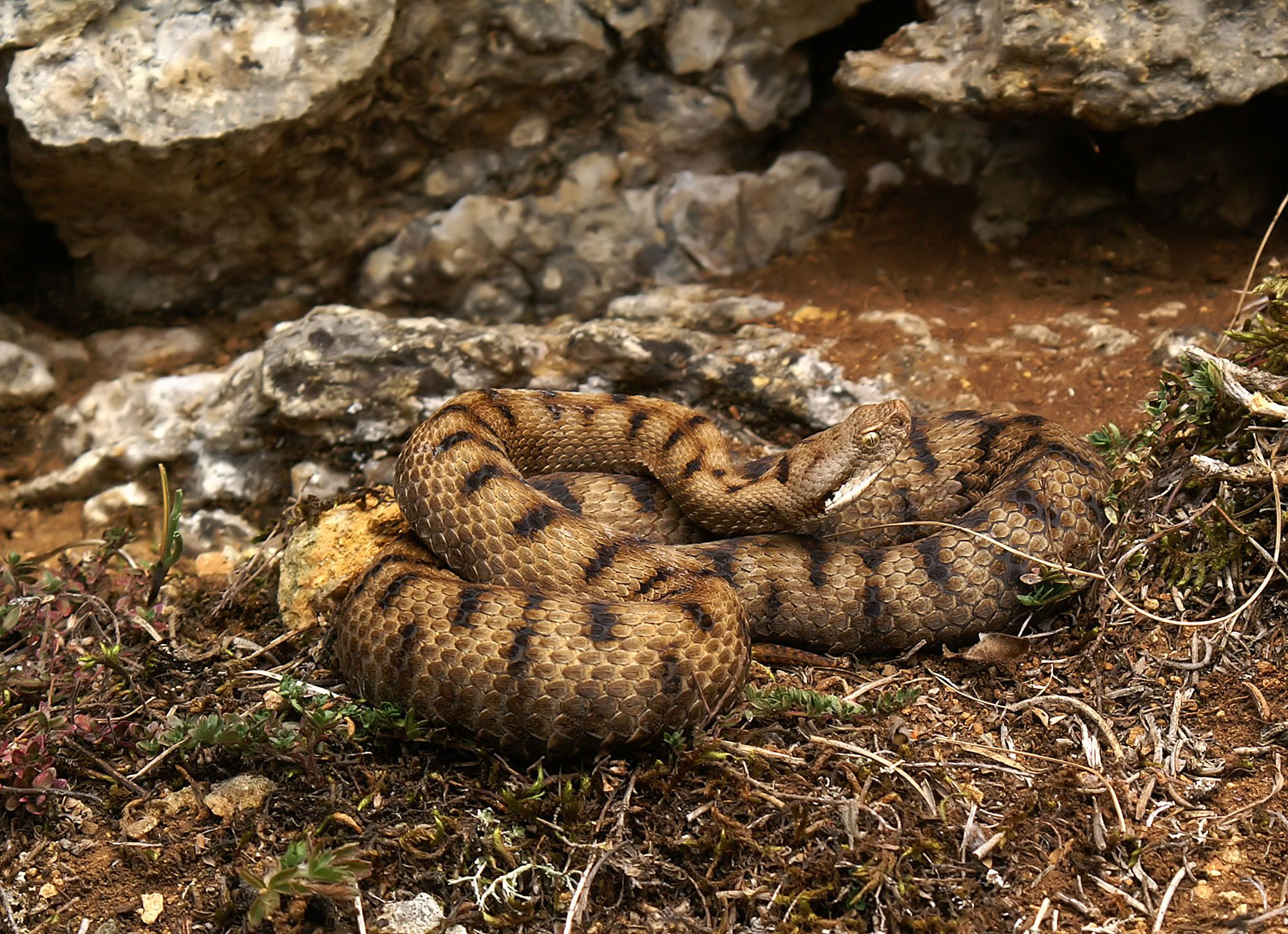
Vipera aspis in Lorraine, France

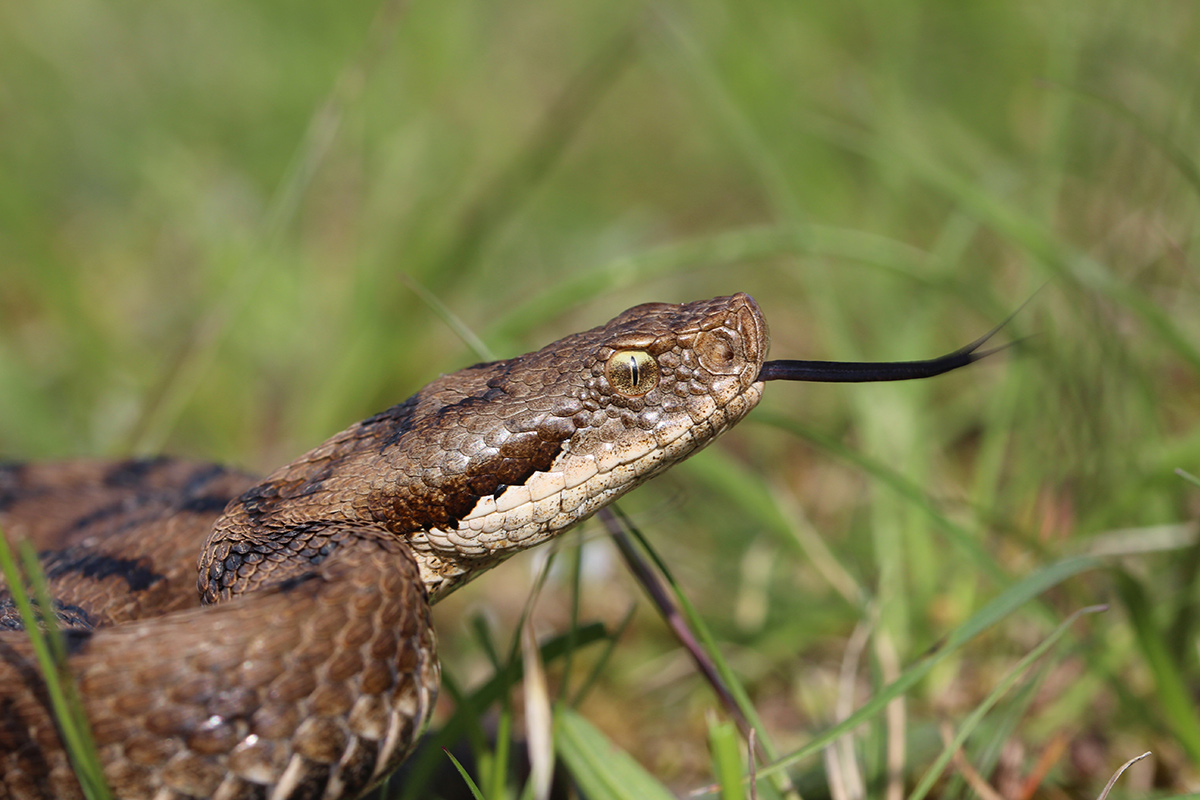
Asp viper (Vipera aspis aspis)

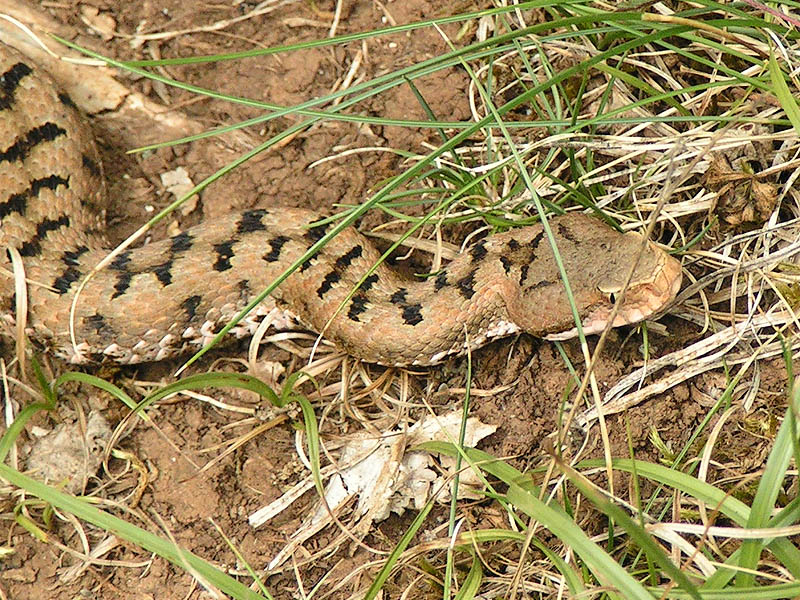
V. a. aspis

This species has a few clearly defined and relatively specific habitat requirements. It needs warm areas that are exposed to the sun, structured vegetation and comparatively dry soils. In Italy and France, it is often found in areas with low mountains or hills, notably in limestone regions, but sometimes occurs in lower plains. It has a preference for vegetated areas or environments with at least some cover. Here it can be found on sunny slopes, on scrublands, in glades, in mountain meadows, forest clearings, at the borders of woods, in rubbish dumps and in stone quarries. In Italy, it occurs in mesic chestnut/oak woodlands and often near streams. Although it is not strongly associated with high altitudes, it has been found at well over 2,100 m (6,900 ft) above sea level in the Pyrenees.

== Venom ==
A bite from this species can be more severe than from V. berus and is very painful. According to Stemmler (1971), about 4% of all untreated bites are fatal. Lombardi and Bianco (1974) mention that this species is responsible for 90% of all cases of snakebite in Italy and it is the only potentially lethal snake in Italian mountains.

The toxicity of the venom varies. Stemmler (1971) states that the population in Passwang district, Switzerland have the strongest venom based on studies conducted on mice. Compared to venoms from other species, it is relatively toxic. Brown (1973) gives LD_{50} values of 1.0 mg/kg IV and 1.0–2.0 mg/kg SC. Tu et al. (1969) report 4.7 mg/kg IM. Venom yield is relatively low. Boquet (1964) reported a daily extraction figure of 9–10 mg.

Envenomation symptoms include rapidly spreading acute pain, followed by edema and discoloration. Severe haemorrhagic necrosis may occur within a few hours. Vision may be severely impaired, most likely due to degradation of blood and blood vessels in the eyes. The venom has both coagulant and anticoagulant effects. The venom may also affect glomerular structure, which can lead to death due to renal failure.

According to Cheymol et al. (1973), the venom does not affect neuromuscular contractions in in vitro preparations. Lack of this neurotoxic affect would indicate that fatal cases involving the cardiovascular system are the result of direct muscle injury or reduced oxygen exchange. On the other hand, Gonzalez (1991) reported that in two cases the victims developed neurotoxic symptoms, including difficulty in breathing and swallowing, as well as paralysis of the bitten limbs.

== Subspecies ==
Subspecies	Taxon author	Common name	Geographic range
V. aspis aspis	Linnaeus, 1758	Common European asp	Found in most of France, except those areas bordering the English Channel. On the Atlantic coast, it is found in Île de Ré, Lorraine and Oléron, but not south of the Gironde estuary. Mostly absent east of the Moselle river and from much of the Mediterranean region, but does occur near Montpellier and in Alpes-Maritimes. A disjunct subpopulation exists in the Pyrenees, notably in Spain southwest of Bilbao. In Germany it occurs in the southern Black Forest along the Swiss border, but is rare in this area. Common in northwestern Italy and western Switzerland.
V. aspis atra	Meisner, 1820	Black asp	Parts of Switzerland, French and Italian Alps
V. aspis francisciredi	Laurenti, 1768	Central Italian asp	Central Italy
V. aspis hugyi	Schinz, 1833	Southern Italian asp	The south of Italy
V. aspis zinnikeri	Kramer, 1958	Gascony asp	Gascony, Andorra and nearby Spain

=== Gallery ===
A Vipera aspis eating a lizard, Tuscany, Italy.

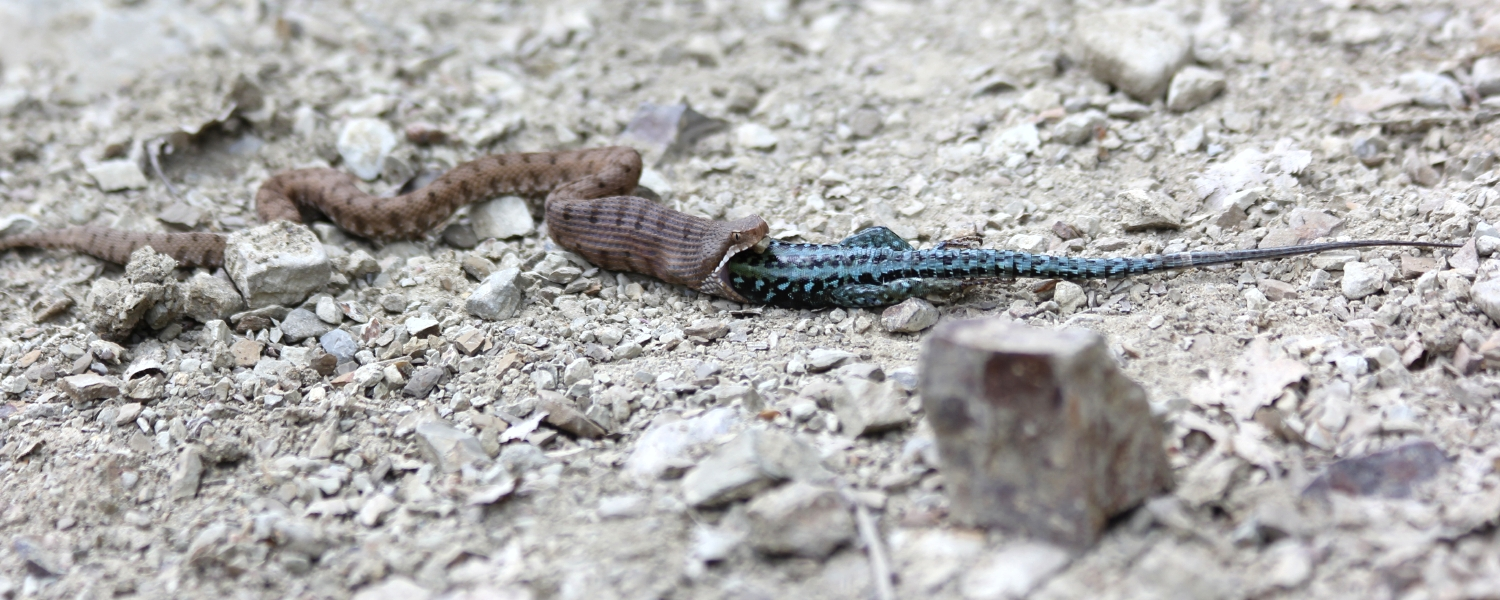

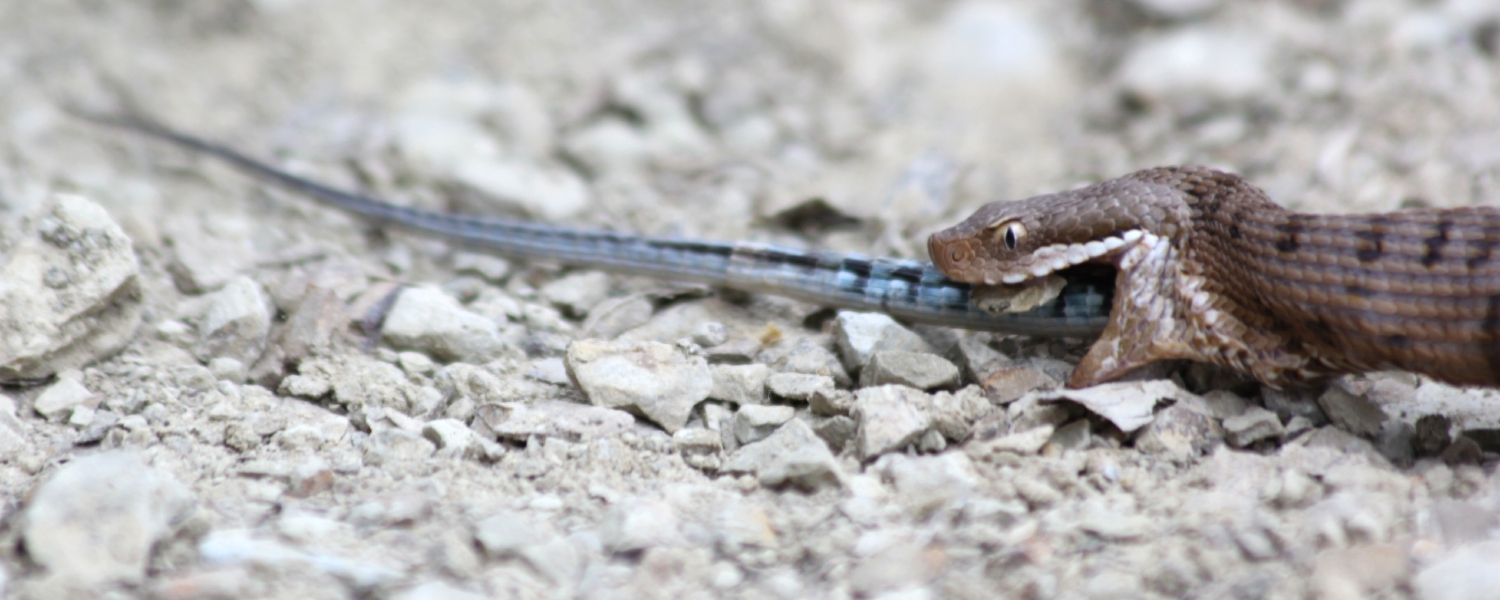

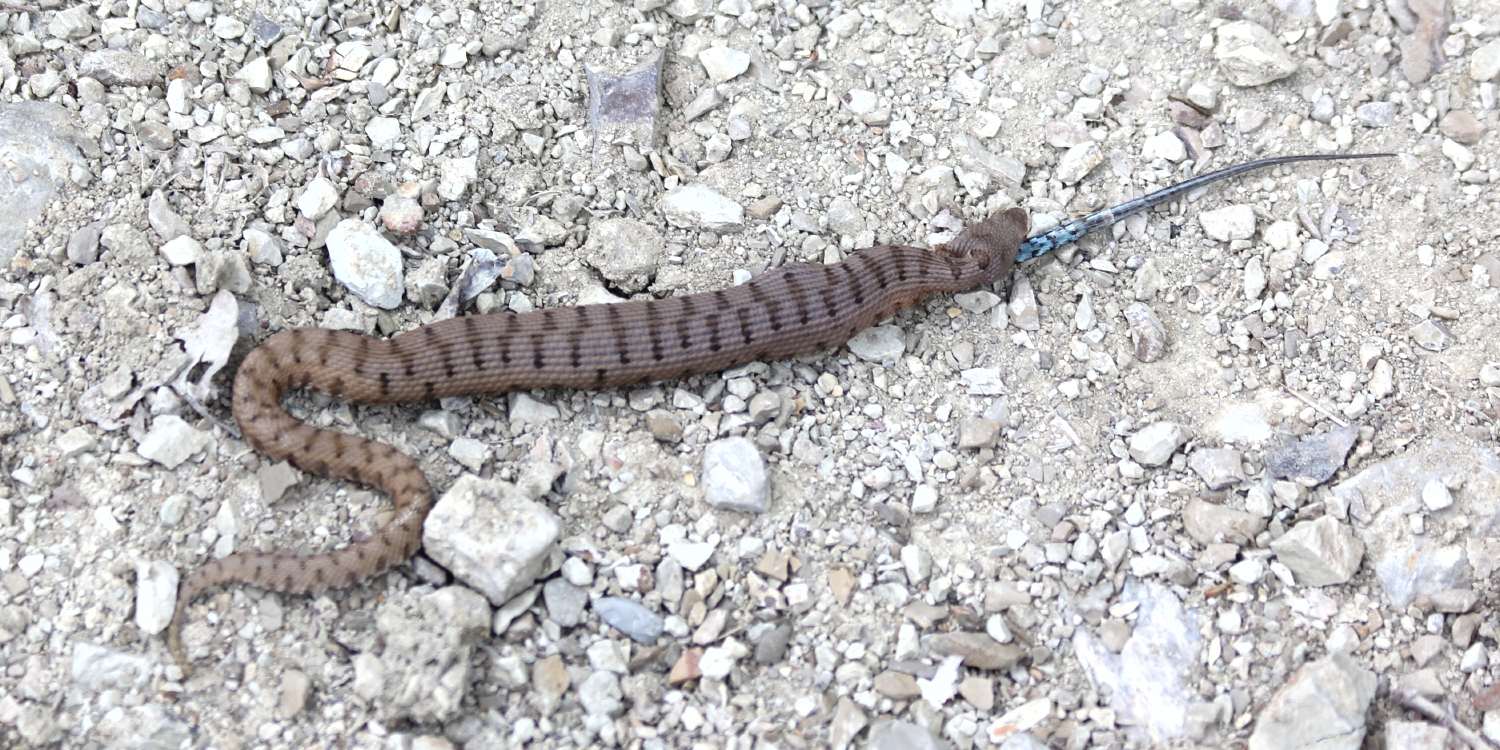
