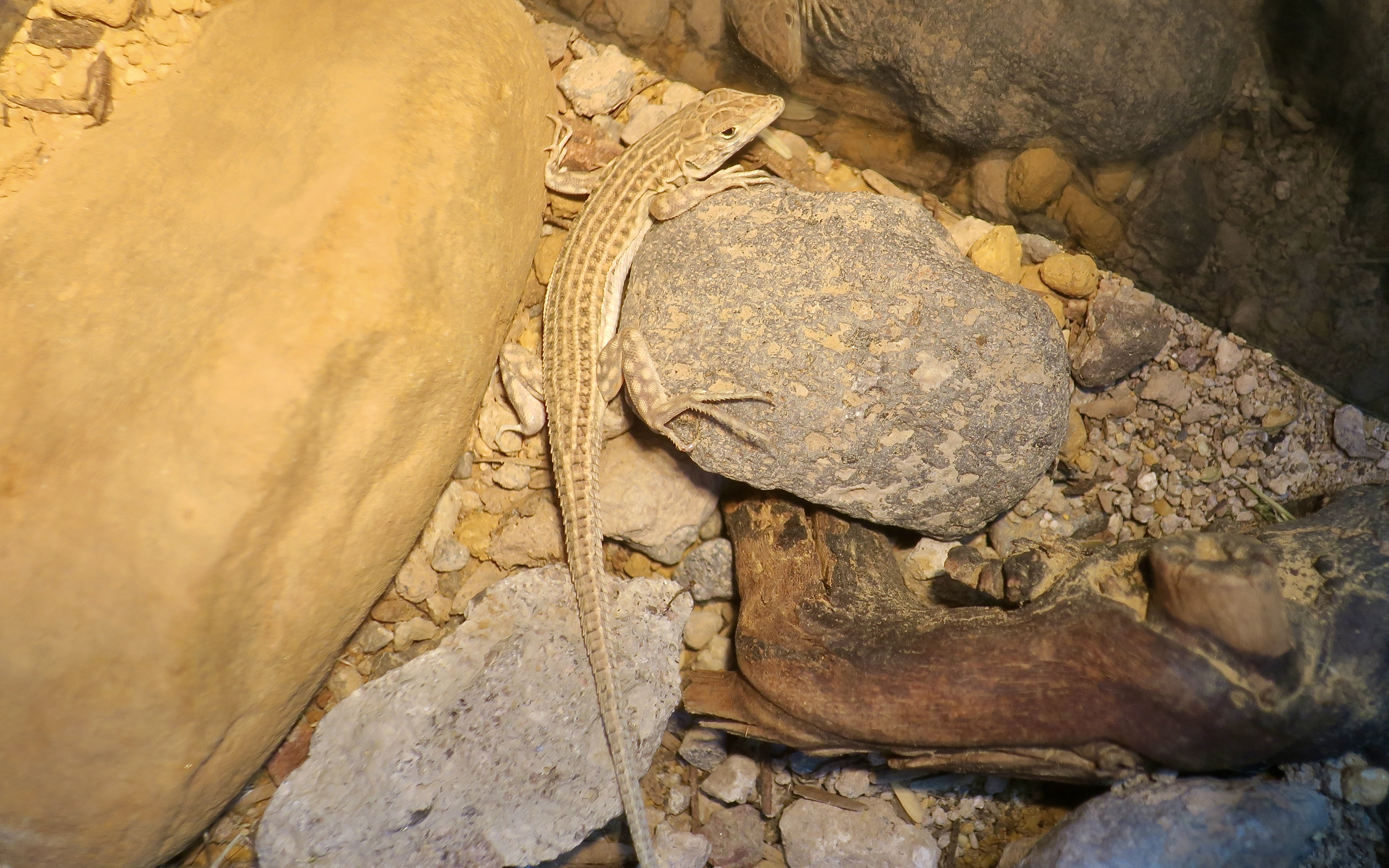

Conservation status
- Vulnerable (IUCN 3.1)

Scientific classification
- Kingdom: Animalia
- Phylum: Chordata
- Class: Reptilia
- Order: Squamata
- Family: Lacertidae
- Genus: Acanthodactylus
- Species: A. pardalis

Binomial name
- Acanthodactylus pardalis (Lichtenstein, 1823)

Synonyms
- Lacerta pardalis Lichtenstein, 1823; Lacerta deserti Milne-Edwards, 1829; Acanthodactylus pardalis — Boulenger, 1887; Acanthodactylus pardalis — Salvador, 1982

= Leopard fringe-fingered lizard =

Species of lizard

The leopard fringe-fingered lizard (Acanthodactylus pardalis), also known commonly as the Egyptian fringe-fingered lizard, is a species of lizard in the family Lacertidae. The species is endemic to North Africa.

== Geographic range ==
A. pardalis is found in Egypt and Libya.

== Habitat ==
The natural habitats of the leopard fringe-fingered lizard are subtropical or tropical dry shrubland, subtropical or tropical dry lowland grassland, and intertidal flats.

== Reproduction ==
A. pardalis is oviparous.

== Conservation status ==
A. pardalis is threatened by habitat loss.
