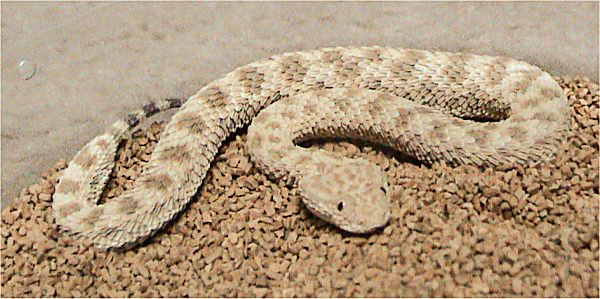

Conservation status
- Least Concern (IUCN 3.1)

Scientific classification
- Kingdom: Animalia
- Phylum: Chordata
- Class: Reptilia
- Order: Squamata
- Suborder: Serpentes
- Family: Viperidae
- Genus: Cerastes
- Species: C. vipera

Binomial name
- Cerastes vipera (Linnaeus, 1758)
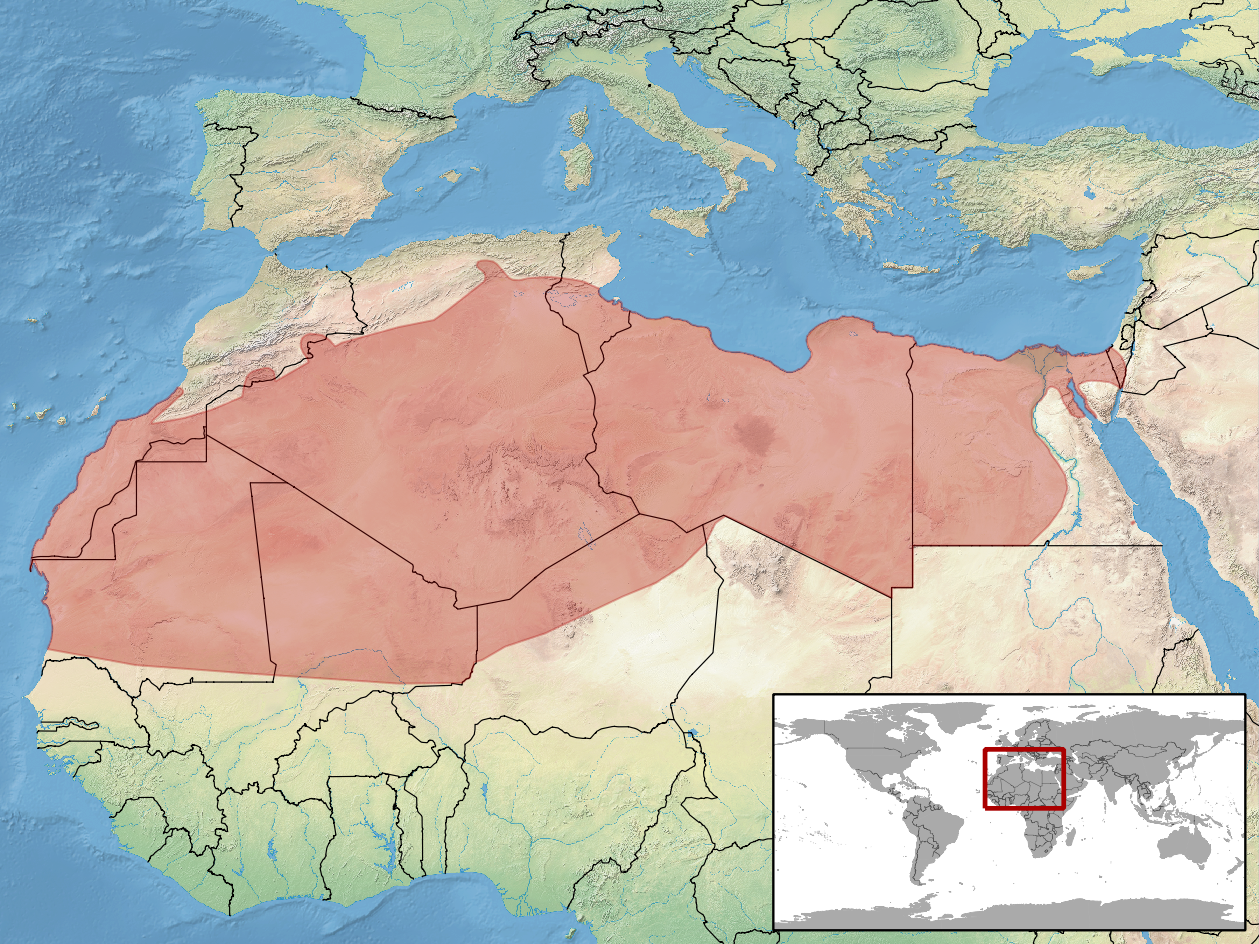

Synonyms
- [Coluber] vipera Linnaeus, 1758; Aspis Cleopatrae Laurenti, 1768; Vipera Aegyptia Latreille In Sonnini & Latreille, 1801; Vipera aegyptiaca Daudin, 1803; Aspis Cleopatra — Gray, 1842; Cerastes Richiei Gray, 1842; Echidna atricauda A.M.C. Duméril, Bibron & A.H.A. Duméril, 1854; Vipera Avicennae Jan, 1859; V[ipera]. (Echidna) Avicennae — Jan, 1863; Vipera avizennae [sic] Strauch, 1869; Cerastes vipera — Boulenger, 1891; Cerastes vipera — Boulenger, 1896; Cerastes vipera inornatus F. Werner, 1929; Aspis vipera — Kramer & Schnurrenberger, 1959; Cerastes vipera — Joger, 1984; Cerastes boehmi Wagner & Wilms, 2010

= Cerastes vipera =

Cerastes vipera Temporal range: Pleistocene-recent

Species of snake

Cerastes vipera, common names Sahara sand viper and Avicenna viper, is a viper species endemic to the deserts of North Africa and the Sinai Peninsula. No subspecies are recognized as being valid. Like all other vipers, it is venomous.

== Description ==
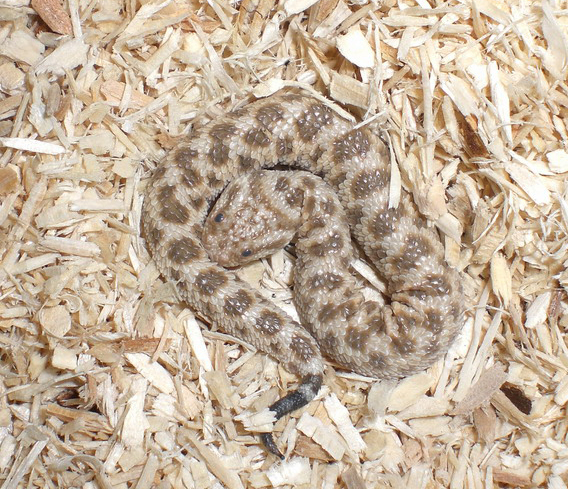
C. vipera, neonate.

Adults of Cerastes vipera average 20–35 cm (8–14 in) in total length (body + tail), with a maximum total length of 50 cm (1.6 ft). Females are larger than males. Small and stout, it has a broad, triangular head with small eyes set well forward and situated on the junction of the side and the top of the head.

== Behavior ==
The hunting strategy of Cerastes vipera is unique when compared to that of other viperids because it uses a combination of both sit-and-wait ambushing and active hunting. Active hunting is predominantly used in the months right before hibernation to increase energy intake before the long dormant period. It is known for burying itself in the sand to stay cool, or to ambush prey. When threatened, it coils up into a distinctive c-shape, causing its scales to rub together to produce a rasping or crackling sound.

== Common names ==
Common names for Cerastes vipera include Sahara sand viper, Avicenna viper, common sand viper, Egyptian asp, Cleopatra's asp, sand viper, Avicenna's sand viper, and lesser cerastes.

== Geographic distribution ==
In arid North Africa, Cerastes vipera is found in Mauritania, Morocco, Algeria, Mali, Tunisia, Libya, Niger, Chad, Sudan, and Egypt ,Palestine. In the Sinai Peninsula is found in Egypt, and Israel.

The type locality given is "Ægypto" (Egypt).

== Reproduction ==
Cerastes vipera is ovoviviparous.
