= List of atractaspidid species and subspecies =

This is a list of all genera, species and subspecies of the family Atractaspididae, otherwise referred to as African burrowing asps, stiletto snakes, or atractaspidids. It follows the taxonomy currently provided by ITIS, which is based on the continuing work of Dr. Roy McDiarmid.

- Amblyodipsas
  - Amblyodipsas concolor
  - Amblyodipsas dimidiata
  - Amblyodipsas katangensis
    - Amblyodipsas katangensis ionidesi
    - Amblyodipsas katangensis katangensis
  - Amblyodipsas microphthalma
  - Amblyodipsas polylepis
    - Amblyodipsas polylepis hildebrandtii
    - Amblyodipsas polylepis polylepis
  - Amblyodipsas rodhaini
  - Amblyodipsas teitana
  - Amblyodipsas unicolor
  - Amblyodipsas ventrimaculata
- Aparallactus
  - Aparallactus capensis
    - Aparallactus capensis bocagii
    - Aparallactus capensis capensis
    - Aparallactus capensis luebberti
    - Aparallactus capensis punctatolineatus
  - Aparallactus guentheri
  - Aparallactus jacksonii
  - Aparallactus lineatus
  - Aparallactus lunulatus
    - Aparallactus lunulatus lunulatus
    - Aparallactus lunulatus nigrocollaris
    - Aparallactus lunulatus scortecci
  - Aparallactus modestus
    - Aparallactus modestus modestus
    - Aparallactus modestus ubangensis
  - Aparallactus moeruensis
  - Aparallactus niger
  - Aparallactus nigriceps
  - Aparallactus turneri
  - Aparallactus werneri
- Atractaspis, Stiletto snakes
  - Atractaspis aterrima, Slender burrowing asp
  - Atractaspis battersbyi, Battersby's burrowing asp
  - Atractaspis bibronii, Bibron's burrowing asp
  - Atractaspis boulengeri, Central African burrowing asp
    - Atractaspis boulengeri boulengeri
    - Atractaspis boulengeri matschiensis
    - Atractaspis boulengeri mixta
    - Atractaspis boulengeri schmidti
    - Atractaspis boulengeri schultzei
    - Atractaspis boulengeri vanderborghti
  - Atractaspis coalescens, Black burrowing asp
  - Atractaspis congica, Congo burrowing asp
    - Atractaspis congica congica
    - Atractaspis congica leleupi
    - Atractaspis congica orientalis
  - Atractaspis corpulenta, Fat burrowing asp
    - Atractaspis corpulenta corpulenta
    - Atractaspis corpulenta kivuensis
    - Atractaspis corpulenta leucura
  - Atractaspis dahomeyensis, Dahomey burrowing asp
  - Atractaspis duerdeni, Duerden's burrowing asp
  - Atractaspis engdahli, Engdahl's burrowing asp
  - Atractaspis irregularis, Variable burrowing asp
    - Atractaspis irregularis angeli
    - Atractaspis irregularis bipostocularis
    - Atractaspis irregularis irregularis
    - Atractaspis irregularis parkeri
    - Atractaspis irregularis uelensis
  - Atractaspis leucomelas, Ogaden burrowing asp
  - Atractaspis microlepidota, Small-scaled burrowing asp
    - Atractaspis microlepidota andersonii
    - Atractaspis microlepidota microlepidota
  - Atractaspis reticulata, Reticulate burrowing asp
    - Atractaspis reticulata brieni
    - Atractaspis reticulata heterochilus
    - Atractaspis reticulata reticulata
  - Atractaspis scorteccii, Somali burrowing asp
- Brachyophis
  - Brachyophis revoili
    - Brachyophis revoili cornii
    - Brachyophis revoili krameri
    - Brachyophis revoili revoili
- Chilorhinophis
  - Chilorhinophis butleri
  - Chilorhinophis carpenteri
    - Chilorhinophis carpenteri carpenteri
    - Chilorhinophis carpenteri liwalensis
  - Chilorhinophis gerardi
    - Chilorhinophis gerardi gerardi
    - Chilorhinophis gerardi tanganyikae
- Elapotinus, Jan's snake
  - Elapotinus picteti, Jan's snake
- Hypoptophis
  - Hypoptophis wilsoni
- Macrelaps
  - Macrelaps microlepidotus
- Micrelaps
  - Micrelaps bicoloratus, Kenya two-headed snake
    - Micrelaps bicoloratus bicoloratus
    - Micrelaps bicoloratus moyeri
  - Micrelaps muelleri, Muller's snake
  - Micrelaps vaillanti, Somali two-headed snake
- Poecilopholis
  - Poecilopholis cameronensis
- Polemon
  - Polemon acanthias
  - Polemon barthii
  - Polemon bocourti
  - Polemon christyi
  - Polemon collaris
    - Polemon collaris brevior
    - Polemon collaris collaris
    - Polemon collaris longior
  - Polemon fulvicollis
    - Polemon fulvicollis fulvicollis
    - Polemon fulvicollis gracilis
    - Polemon fulvicollis graveri
    - Polemon fulvicollis laurenti
  - Polemon gabonensis
    - Polemon gabonensis gabonensis
    - Polemon gabonensis schmidti
  - Polemon gracilis
  - Polemon griseiceps
  - Polemon leopoldi
  - Polemon neuwiedi
  - Polemon notatus
    - Polemon notatus aemulans
    - Polemon notatus notatus
  - Polemon robustus
- Xenocalamus
  - Xenocalamus bicolor
    - Xenocalamus bicolor australis
    - Xenocalamus bicolor bicolor
    - Xenocalamus bicolor concavorostralis
    - Xenocalamus bicolor lineatus
    - Xenocalamus bicolor machadoi
    - Xenocalamus bicolor maculatus
  - Xenocalamus mechowii
    - Xenocalamus mechowii inornatus
    - Xenocalamus mechowii mechowii
  - Xenocalamus michelli
  - Xenocalamus sabiensis
  - Xenocalamus transvaalensis, Transvaal quillsnout snake
