= Chilorhinophis carpenteri =

Scientific classification
- Kingdom: Animalia
- Phylum: Chordata
- Class: Reptilia
- Order: Squamata
- Suborder: Serpentes
- Family: Atractaspididae
- Genus: Chilorhinophis
- Species: C. carpenteri

Binomial name
- Chilorhinophis carpenteri (Parker, 1927)

Synonyms
- Parkerophis carpenteri Parker, 1927; Chilorhinophis carpenteri — de Witte & Laurent, 1947; Chilorhinophis butleri — Battersby, 1950

Species of snake

Chilorhinophis carpenteri, or the Liwale two-headed snake, is a species of mildly venomous snake in the family Atractaspididae. The species is native to southeastern Africa.

== Geographic range ==
C. carpenteri is found in Mozambique and southeastern Tanzania.

== Taxonomy ==
C. carpenteri was originally named Parkerophis carpenteri. Some herpetologists, including Battersby, consider C. carpenteri to be a synonym of C. butleri.

== Etymology ==
The specific name, carpenteri, honors the type specimen's collector, British physician and entomologist Geoffrey Douglas Hale Carpenter.
