= Chilorhinophis gerardi =

Conservation status
- Least Concern (IUCN 3.1)

Scientific classification
- Kingdom: Animalia
- Phylum: Chordata
- Class: Reptilia
- Order: Squamata
- Suborder: Serpentes
- Family: Atractaspididae
- Genus: Chilorhinophis
- Species: C. gerardi

Binomial name
- Chilorhinophis gerardi (Boulenger, 1913)

Synonyms
- Apostolepis gerardi Boulenger, 1913; Parkerophis gerardi — Barbour & Amaral, 1927; Chilorhinophis gerardi — de Witte & Laurent, 1947

Species of snake

Chilorhinophis gerardi, commonly known as the Congo two-headed snake, Gerard's black and yellow burrowing snake, and Gerard's two-headed snake, is a species of mildly venomous snake in the family Atractaspididae. The species is endemic to Africa.

== Etymology ==
The specific name, gerardi, is in honor of Belgian physician and naturalist Pol Gérard (1886-1961) who collected the type specimen.

== Geographic range ==
C. gerardi is found in southern Democratic Republic of the Congo (formerly known as Zaire), Tanzania, Zambia, and Zimbabwe.

== Habitat ==
The preferred natural habitat of C. gerardi is savanna, at altitudes up to 920 m (3,020 ft).

== Reproduction ==
C. gerardi is oviparous.

== Subspecies ==
Two subspecies of C. gerardi are recognized as being valid, including the nominotypical subspecies.

- Chilorhinophis gerardi gerardi (Boulenger, 1913)
- Chilorhinophis gerardi tanganyikae Loveridge, 1951

Nota bene: A trinomial authority in parentheses indicates that the subspecies was originally described in a genus other than Chilorhinophis.
