= Polemon fulvicollis =

Scientific classification
- Kingdom: Animalia
- Phylum: Chordata
- Class: Reptilia
- Order: Squamata
- Suborder: Serpentes
- Family: Atractaspididae
- Genus: Polemon
- Species: P. fulvicollis

Binomial name
- Polemon fulvicollis (Mocquard, 1887)

Synonyms
- Microsoma fulvicollis Mocquard, 1887; Miodon fulvicollis - Trape & Roux-Estève, 1990; Polemon fulvicollis - Welch, 1994

Species of snake

Polemon fulvicollis, or the African snake-eater, is a species of mildly venomous rear-fanged snake in the family Atractaspididae. It is endemic to Africa.

== Geographic range ==
It is found in Republic of the Congo, Democratic Republic of the Congo, Gabon and Uganda.

== Subspecies ==
Four subspecies are recognized including the nominate race.

- Polemon fulvicollis fulvicollis (Mocquard, 1887)
- Polemon fulvicollis gracilis (de Witte & Laurent, 1943)
- Polemon fulvicollis graueri (Sternfeld, 1908)
- Polemon fulvicollis laurenti (de Witte & Laurent, 1943)
