= Polemon gabonensis =

Scientific classification
- Domain: Eukaryota
- Kingdom: Animalia
- Phylum: Chordata
- Class: Reptilia
- Order: Squamata
- Suborder: Serpentes
- Family: Atractaspididae
- Genus: Polemon
- Species: P. gabonensis

Binomial name
- Polemon gabonensis (A.H.A. Duméril, 1856)

Synonyms
- Elapomorphus gabonensis A.H.A. Duméril, 1856; Elapomorphus gabonicus Jan, 1862; Elapomorphus (Urobelus) gabonicus - Jan, 1866; Urobelus gabonicus; Boulenger, 1887; Elapomorphus cæcutiens Günther, 1888; Miodon gabonensis; Boulenger, 1896; Polemon gabonensis; Welch, 1994

Species of snake

Polemon gabonensis, or the Gaboon snake-eater, is a species of mildly venomous rear-fanged snake in the family Atractaspididae. It is endemic to Africa.

== Geographic range ==
It is found in Benin, Cameroon, Central African Republic, Democratic Republic of the Congo, Nigeria, and Togo.

== Description ==
Dorsally dark brown or olive, with three darker stripes, or all blackish. Upper lip white. A pale brownish band across the occiput. Ventrals, subcaudals, and terminal caudal scute white.

Adults may attain a total length of 51 cm (20 inches), with a tail 23 mm (7/8 inch) long.

Dorsal scales smooth, without apical pits, arranged in 15 rows. Ventrals 214-249; anal plate divided; subcaudals 16-24, also divided (in two rows).

Diameter of eye 1/3 to 1/2 its distance from the mouth. Rostral broader than high, barely visible from above. Internasals as long as or slightly shorter than the prefrontals. Frontal slightly broader than the supraocular, 1 1/3 to 1 1/2 times as long as broad, as long as its distance from the rostral, much shorter than the parietals. Nasal entire or imperfectly divided. One preocular, in contact with the nasal. One or two postoculars. Temporals 1+1. Seven upper labials, third and fourth entering the eye. First lower labial forming a suture with its fellow behind the mental. Four lower labials in contact with the anterior chin shield. Two pairs of chin shields, the anterior pair longer than the posterior pair.

== Subspecies ==
Two subspecies are recognized including the nominate race.

- Polemon gabonensis gabonensis (A.H.A. Duméril, 1856)
- Polemon gabonensis schmidti (de Witte & Laurent, 1947)

== Etymology ==
The subspecific name, schmidti, is in honor of American herpetologist Karl Patterson Schmidt.
