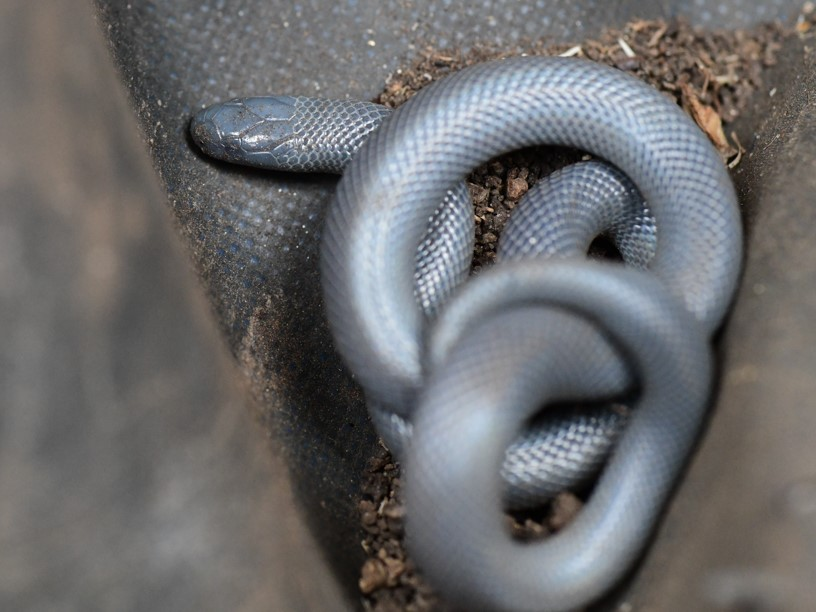

Conservation status
- Least Concern (IUCN 3.1)

Scientific classification
- Kingdom: Animalia
- Phylum: Chordata
- Class: Reptilia
- Order: Squamata
- Suborder: Serpentes
- Family: Atractaspididae
- Genus: Atractaspis
- Species: A. irregularis

Binomial name
- Atractaspis irregularis (J.T. Reinhardt, 1843)

Synonyms
- Elaps irregularis J.T. Reinhardt, 1843; Atractaspis coalescens Perret, 1960

= Atractaspis irregularis =

Species of snake

Atractaspis irregularis, or the variable burrowing asp, is a species of venomous snake in the family Atractaspididae. It is found in Africa.

== Description ==
Atractaspis irregularis is completely dark brown or black. The snout is very short and rounded. The portion of the rostral visible from above measures 2/3 to 3/4 of its distance from the frontal. The frontal is as long as it is broad, and much longer than its distance from the end of the snout. The dorsal scales are in 25 or 27 rows, with ventral scales 220–257; anal divided; subcaudals 22–28 and divided.

Adults may attain a total length of 56 cm (22 in), with a tail 3.5 cm (1 3/8 in) long.
