= Chilorhinophis butleri =

Conservation status
- Least Concern (IUCN 3.1)

Scientific classification
- Kingdom: Animalia
- Phylum: Chordata
- Class: Reptilia
- Order: Squamata
- Suborder: Serpentes
- Family: Atractaspididae
- Genus: Chilorhinophis
- Species: C. butleri

Binomial name
- Chilorhinophis butleri F. Werner, 1907

Species of snake

Chilorhinophis butleri, also known commonly as Butler's black-and-yellow burrowing snake and Butler's two-headed snake, is a species of mildly venomous snake in the family Atractaspididae. The species is endemic to East Africa.

== Geographic range ==
C. butleri is found in Mozambique, South Sudan, and Tanzania.

== Etymology ==
The specific name, butleri, is in honor of English zoologist Arthur Lennox Butler (1873–1939), who was the son of Edward Arthur Butler.

== Habitat ==
The preferred natural habitat of C. butleri is savanna, at altitudes around 400 m (1,300 ft).

== Behavior ==
C. butleri burrows in soft, sandy soils and leaf litter.

== Diet ==
C. butleri is known to prey upon amphisbaenians, and it may also eat snakes.

== Reproduction ==
C. butleri is oviparous.
