= Geoffrey Douglas Hale Carpenter =

British entomologist and medical doctor

G.D. Hale Carpenter
- Born: 26 October 1882; Eton College, Berkshire, England
- Died: 30 January 1953 (aged 70); Oxford, England
- Scientific career
- Fields: Entomology
- Workplaces: Jesus College, Oxford

G.D. Hale Carpenter MBE (26 October 1882 in Eton, Berkshire – 30 January 1953 in Oxford) was a British entomologist and medical doctor. He worked first at the London School of Hygiene and Tropical Medicine, and in Uganda, on tse-tse flies and sleeping sickness. His main work in zoology was on mimicry in butterflies, an interest he developed in Uganda and Tanganyika. He succeeded E.B. Poulton as Hope Professor of Zoology at Oxford University from 1933 to 1948.

== Biography ==
Douglas was a son of Philip Herbert Carpenter DSc FRS, a schoolmaster at Eton College; a grandson of the naturalist and physiologist William Benjamin Carpenter; and a great-grandson of Lant Carpenter, a Unitarian minister.

Carpenter attended St Catherine's College, Oxford, graduating in 1904. He studied medicine at St George's Hospital, London, graduating as a Bachelor of Medicine, Bachelor of Surgery (the standard combined medical degree at the University of London at that time) in 1908. He then joined the London School of Hygiene and Tropical Medicine, and became a Doctor of Medicine in 1913 with a dissertation on the tsetse fly (Glossina palpalis) and sleeping sickness.

In 1919 he married Amy Frances Thomas-Peter from Cornwall. The marriage had no issue.

== Career ==
In 1910 he joined the Colonial Medical Service, where he worked in Uganda on the north shore of Lake Victoria. Upon the outbreak of World War I, Carpenter was called to service in the British Army Medical Corps. He was stationed with the troops at the border between Uganda and German East Africa. In December 1914 he was appointed Medical Officer at the fort in Kakindu, southern Uganda. As it turned out, he had plenty of spare time, and spent it studying the local butterflies. "The hosts of butterflies at Kakindu passed beyond anything I had ever see; some days are quite unforgettable".

From May 1916 to January 1918, he worked in Tanganyika (former German E. Africa), 276 miles south to south-east of Lake Victoria. Here he conducted experiments on palatability with young insectivorous monkeys. He tested the edibility of cryptic and aposematic insects. This was propitious, because later, back at Oxford, both he and E.B. Poulton worked on the role of predators in shaping mimicry. The standard theory was that cryptic forms were palatable, and aposematic forms were distasteful, implying that palatable mimics of distasteful forms could gain protection from predation. The question at stake was whether the observations, which dated from work by naturalists in the 19th century, could be accounted for by natural selection.

=== Mimicry ===
In England the geneticist R.C. Punnett, and in America the ornithologist W.L. McAtee, doubted both that birds could distinguish distasteful forms, and that their predation was heavy enough to bring about the colour forms found in butterflies. Punnett's 1915 Mimicry in butterflies rejected selection as the main cause of mimicry. He noted:

1. The absence of transitional forms and the frequent lack of mimicry in male butterflies were unexplained by selectionist theory.
2. The enigma of polymorphic mimicry. Some species of butterfly mimicked not merely one, but several models. In breeding experiments these polymorphs cleanly segregated according to Mendel’s law of segregation.
3. Evidence of birds as selective agents was slight and little was known of birds' discriminatory powers, and
4. The gradual accumulation of minute variations did not fit with the facts of heredity.

For Punnett, none of these observations were explained by gradual selectionism. Instead he thought mimicry had arisen from sudden mutational jumps (saltations). Once a mimic was formed by mutation, natural selection might play a conservative role.

However, one by one, each of these objections were shown to be without substance. Evidence from field observations and experiments showed that birds were often the agents of selection in insects. Evidence that small-scale mutations were common arrived as soon as breeding experiments were designed to detect them: it was a consequence of experimental methods that early mutations were so noteworthy. Explanations for polymorphism were advanced by E.B. Ford and Dobzhansky and colleagues, who developed experimental methods for populations in the wild. The question of polymorphism is discussed further in polymorphism (biology).

The gradual coming-together of field observations and experimental genetics is part of the evolutionary synthesis which took place in the middle of the twentieth century. The small 1933 book on mimicry by Carpenter and E.B. Ford was the first book on ecological genetics, a field which produced a series of classic studies uniting fieldwork with laboratory genetics. The book is a minor masterpiece of evolutionary biology.

== Legacy ==
Carpenter is commemorated in the scientific names of two species of African reptiles: Chilorhinophis carpenteri and Kinyongia carpenteri.

== Obituaries ==
- Hobby, B.M. (1953). "Geoffrey Douglas Hale Carpenter". British Medical Journal 1: 406.
- Remington, Charles L. (1954). "Geoffrey Douglas Hale Carpenter". Lepidopterist's News 8: 31–43.

== Publications ==
- (1920) A Naturalist on Lake Victoria, with an Account of Sleeping Sickness and the Tse–tse Fly. London: Unwin.
- (1921) "Experiments on the relative edibility of insects, with special reference to their coloration". Transactions of the Royal Entomological Society, London 54: 1–105.
- with E.B. Ford (1933). Mimicry. London: Methuen.
- (1933) "Gregarious roosting habits of aposematic butterflies". Proceedings of the Entomological Society of London 8: 110–111.
- (1935) "The Rhopalocera of Abyssinia a faunistic study". Trans. R. Entomol. Soc. London 83 : 313–447.
- (1936) "Charles Darwin and entomology". Transactions of the South–eastern Union of Scientific Societies. Papers Contributed to Congress 1936: 1–23.
- (1938) "Audible emission of defensive froth by insects with an appendix on the anatomical structures concerned in a moth by H. Eltringham". Proceedings of the Zoological Society of London 108: 243–252.
- (1939) "Birds as enemies of butterflies, with special reference to mimicry". Proceedings, VII Internationaler Kongress für Entomologie, Berlin 1938: 1061–1074.
- (1941) "The relative frequency of beakmarks on butterflies of different edibility to birds". Proc. Zool. Soc. London (Series A) 3: 223–231.
- (1947) "The writings of I. Portschinsky on warning colours and eyespots". Proc. Entomol. Soc. London. Series A. General Entomology 22: 103–113.
- (1949) "Pseudacraea eurytus (L.) (Lep. Nymphalidae): a study of a polymorphic mimic in various degrees of speciation". Trans. R. Entomol. Soc. London 100: 71–133.
- (1953) "The genus Euploea (Lep. Danaidae) in Microneia, Melanesia, Polynesia and Australia. A zoo–geographical study". Trans. Zool. Soc. London 28: 1–184, plates 1–9.
