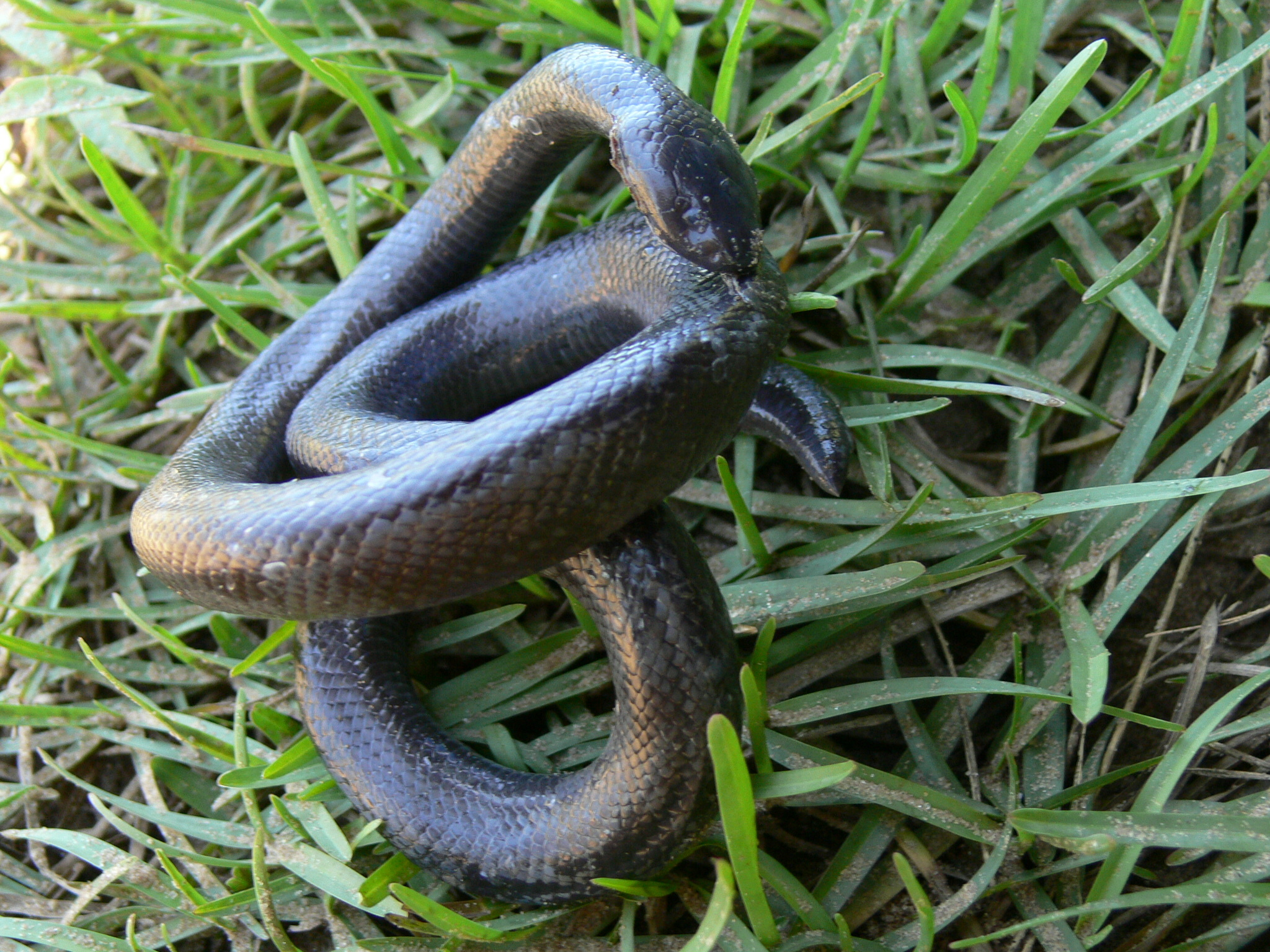

Conservation status
- Least Concern (IUCN 3.1)

Scientific classification
- Kingdom: Animalia
- Phylum: Chordata
- Class: Reptilia
- Order: Squamata
- Suborder: Serpentes
- Family: Atractaspididae
- Genus: Atractaspis
- Species: A. boulengeri

Binomial name
- Atractaspis boulengeri Mocquard, 1897

= Atractaspis boulengeri =

Species of snake

Atractaspis boulengeri, also known commonly as Boulenger's mole viper, the Central African burrowing asp, and simply the mole viper, is a species of venomous snake in the subfamily Atractaspidinae of the family Lamprophiidae. The species is endemic to Africa. There are six recognized subspecies.

== Geographic range ==
A. boulengeri is found in Angola, Cameroon, Central African Republic, Republic of the Congo, Democratic Republic of the Congo, and Gabon.

== Habitat ==
The preferred natural habitats of A. boulengeri are forest and freshwater wetlands, at altitudes of 10–1,000 m (33–3,281 ft).

== Reproduction ==
A. boulengeri is oviparous.

== Subspecies ==
The following six subspecies, including the nominotypical subspecies, are recognized as being valid.

- Atractaspis boulengeri boulengeri Mocquard, 1897
- Atractaspis boulengeri matschiensis F. Werner, 1897
- Atractaspis boulengeri mixta Laurent, 1945
- Atractaspis boulengeri schmidti Laurent, 1945
- Atractaspis boulengeri schultzei Sternfeld, 1917
- Atractaspis boulengeri vanderborghti Laurent, 1956

== Etymology ==
The specific epithet, boulengeri, is in honor of Belgian-British herpetologist George Albert Boulenger.
