= Edward Arthur Butler =

English ornithologist (1843–1916)

Colonel Edward Arthur Butler
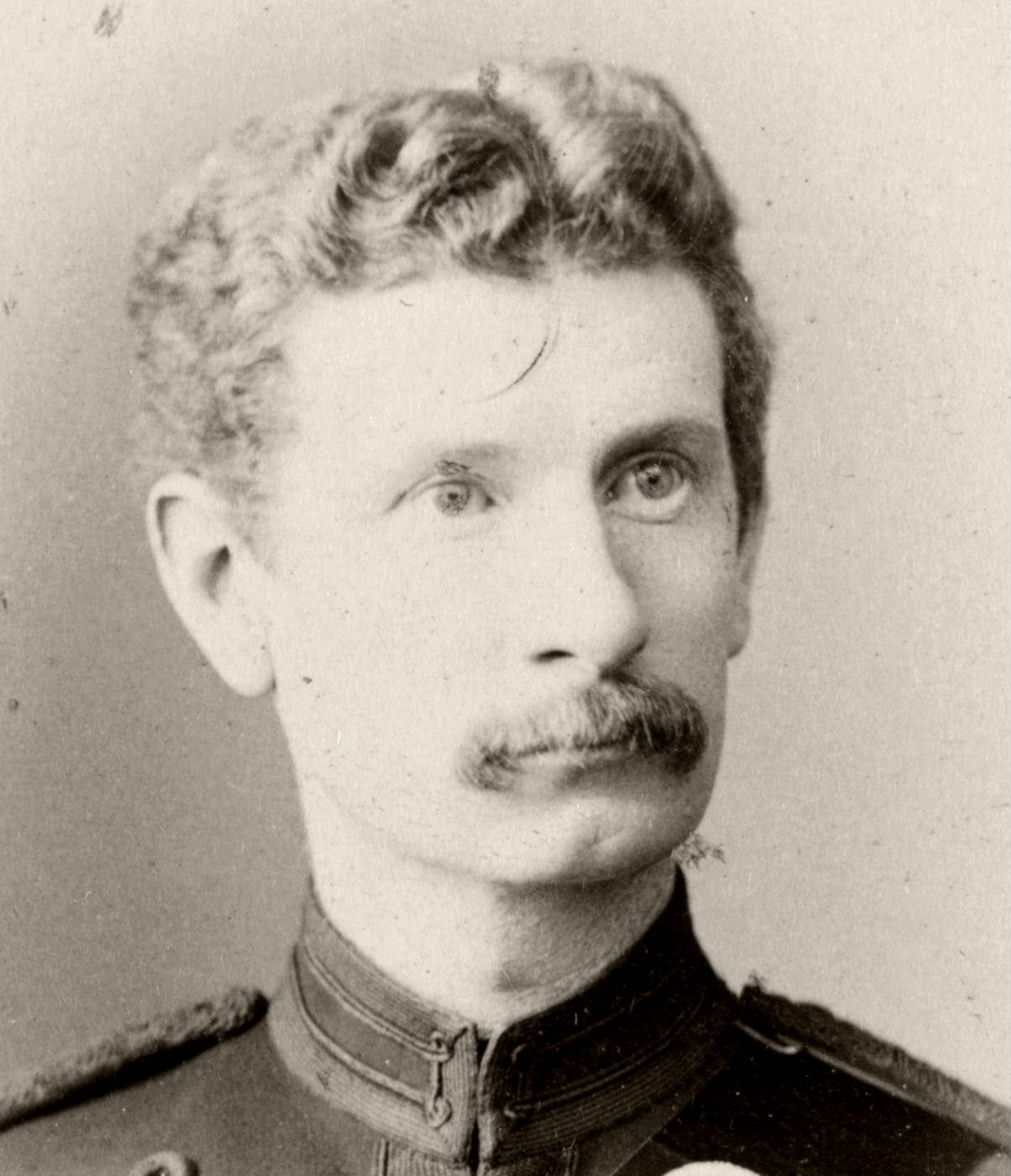
- Butler, in c. 1882
- Born: 3 July 1843; Warwickshire, England
- Died: 16 April 1916 (aged 72); Stokesby, Norfolk, England
- Occupations: Army officer; naturalist; taxidermist; writer
- Years active: 83rd (County of Dublin) Regiment of Foot 1864–1884, retired as lieutenant-colonel.
- Known for: Ornithology: taxidermy collection and academic papers

Colonel Edward Arthur Butler (3 July 1843 – 16 April 1916) was an English ornithologist and British Army officer. He is commemorated in the scientific specific name for the Omani owl, Strix butleri.

== Personal life ==
Butler was born at Coton House, Churchover, Warwickshire and studied at Eton College. He was the third son of Charles Lennox Butler, and a grandson of the 13th Lord Dunboyne. He married Clara Maria née Francis in 1872 and had three sons, Charles Edward, Harry Francis, and Arthur Lennox. Butler was found dead in his garden at Winsford Hall, Stokesby, near Great Yarmouth on 16 April 1916. A coroner's court held at Winsford Hall returned a verdict of “Suicide during temporary insanity”, Butler was 72 years old.

== Career ==
Butler joined the army at the age of 21, and served in Gibraltar, India and South Africa with the 83rd (County of Dublin) Regiment of Foot. He retired in 1884 as a lieutenant-colonel in the Royal Irish Rifles.

== Ornithology ==
Butler was a keen bird collector and taxidermist. His collections were acquired by the Natural History Museum, in part directly and also through the collections of Allan Octavian Hume, Lord Rothschild and others. Butler's son Arthur Lennox Butler was also an ornithologist, and had four species of reptiles named in his honour, including the Australian venomous snake, Chilorhinophis butleri.
