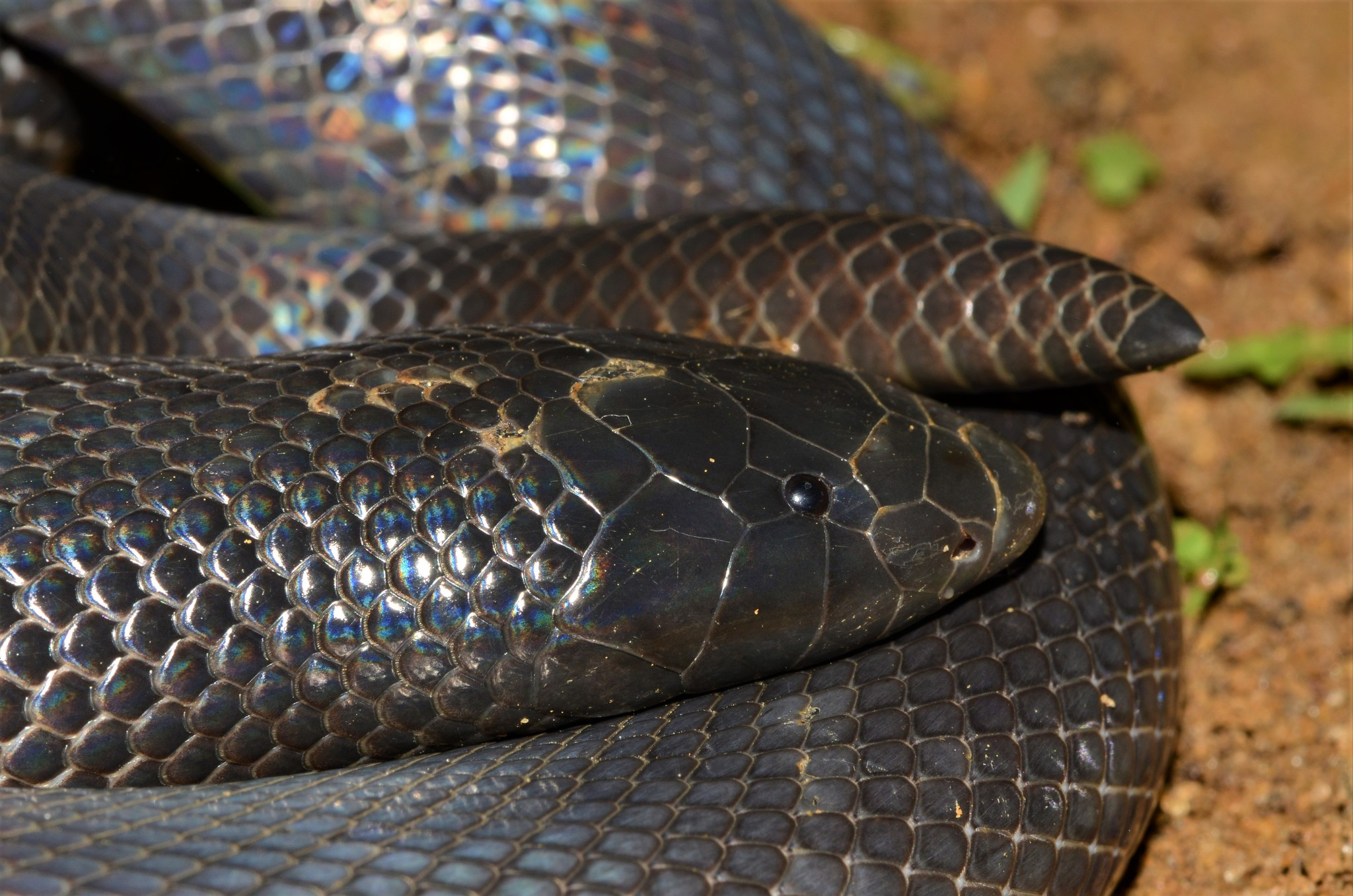

Scientific classification
- Kingdom: Animalia
- Phylum: Chordata
- Class: Reptilia
- Order: Squamata
- Suborder: Serpentes
- Family: Atractaspididae
- Genus: Atractaspis
- Species: A. corpulenta

Binomial name
- Atractaspis corpulenta (Hallowell, 1854)

Synonyms
- Brachycranion corpulentum Hallowell, 1854; Atactaspis corpulentus; Hallowell, 1857; Atractaspis leucura Mocquard, 1885; Atractaspis corpulenta; K.P. Schmidt & Noble, 1923

= Atractaspis corpulenta =

Species of snake

Atractaspis corpulenta, commonly known as the fat burrowing asp, is a species of snake in the family Atractaspididae. It is endemic to Africa.

== Description ==
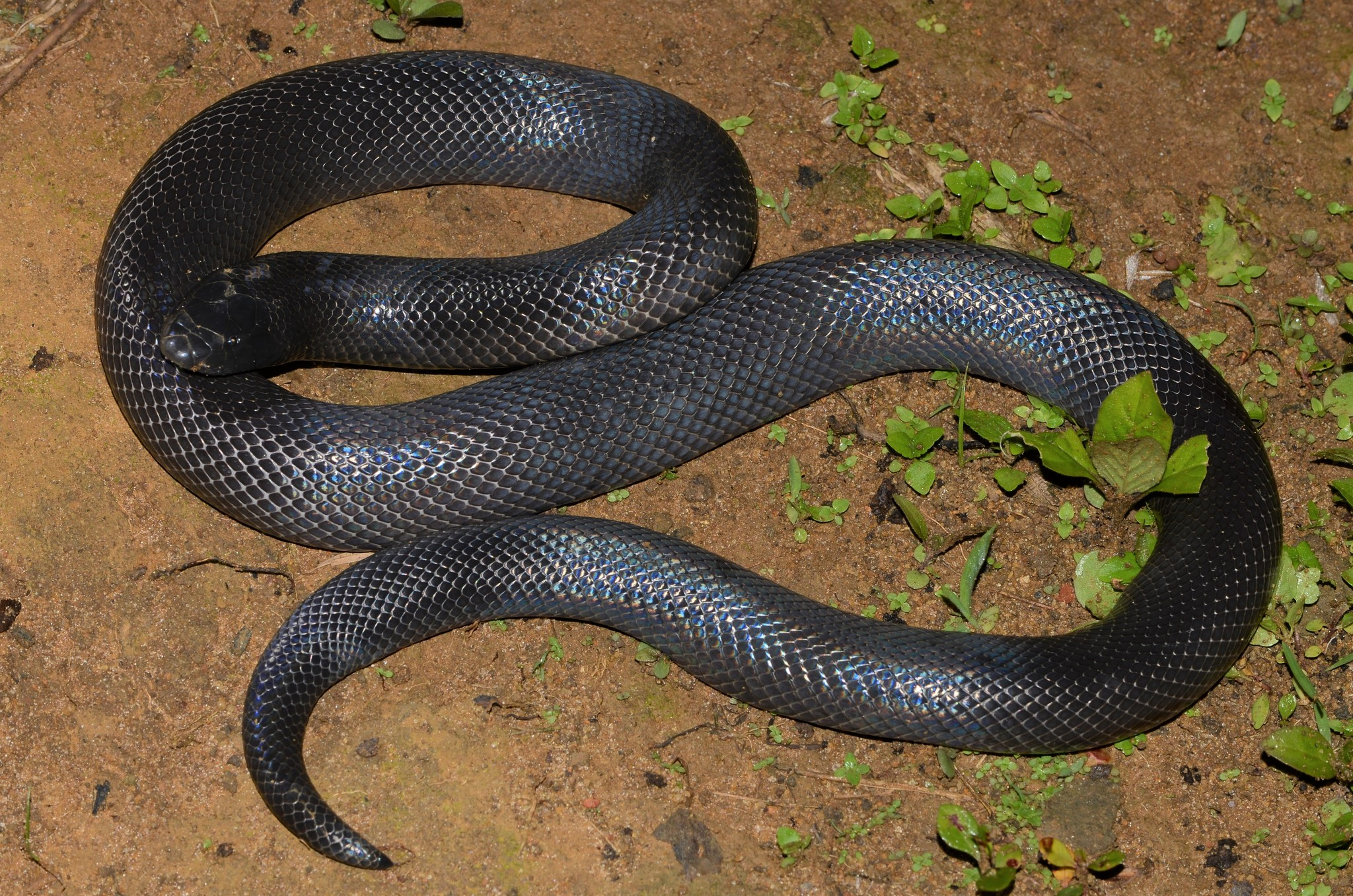
Full body view of the fat burrowing asp

Blackish brown above and below; tail sometimes white. Snout strongly projecting, cuneiform. Rostral large, upper portion as long as its distance from the frontal. Dorsal scales in 23, 25, or 27 rows. Ventrals 178–193; anal entire; subcaudals 23–27, all entire or only a few divided. Total length 34.5 cm (13 1/2 in); tail 33 mm (1 1/4 in).
