= Hypoptophis =

Scientific classification
- Kingdom: Animalia
- Phylum: Chordata
- Class: Reptilia
- Order: Squamata
- Suborder: Serpentes
- Family: Atractaspididae
- Genus: Hypoptophis; Boulenger, 1908
- Species: H. wilsonii

Binomial name
- Hypoptophis wilsonii Boulenger, 1908

Synonyms
- Hypoptophis wilsonii Boulenger, 1908; Michellia katangae L. Müller, 1911; Hypoptophis wilsoni wilsoni — de Witte & Laurent, 1947; Hypoptophis wilsoni katangae — de Witte & Laurent, 1947; Hypoptophis wilsonii — Broadley et al., 2003; Hypoptophis wilsonii — Wallach et al., 2014

Genus of snakes

Common names: African bighead snake, wedge-snouted burrowing snake.

Hypoptophis is a monotypic genus created for the rear-fanged (opisthoglyphous) mildly venomous snake species, Hypoptophis wilsonii. The species, which is endemic to Africa, is in the subfamily Aparallactinae of the family Atractaspididae. There are no subspecies that are recognized as being valid.

== Geographic range ==
Hypoptophis wilsonii is found in Angola, southern Democratic Republic of the Congo (formerly Zaire), and Zambia.

The type locality is "Inkongo, on the Sankuru River, in the Kasai Province of the Congo".

== Description (diagnosis) of genus ==
The genus Hypoptophis exhibits the following characters. The maxilla is very short, with four teeth gradually increasing in size, followed, after an interspace, by two large grooved fangs situated below the eye. The anterior mandibular teeth are slightly enlarged. The head is small, not distinct from neck. The snout is much depressed, very prominent. The rostral is very large, with an obtuse horizontal edge, concave below. The eye is very small, with a vertically elliptic pupil. The nostril is pierced in a semidivided nasal. There is no loreal scale. There is one preocular, which is in contact with the nasal. The body is cylindrical. The tail is short. The dorsal scales are smooth, without pits, and arranged in 15 rows at midbody. The ventrals are rounded. The subcaudals are single (undivided).

== Description of species ==
Hypoptophis wilsonii is completely blackish brown both dorsally and ventrally.

The holotype, a female, is 56 cm (22 in) in total length, of which 10 cm (3 7/8 in) is tail.

The ventrals number 118. The anal plate is entire. The subcaudals number 36, and are also entire.

The portion of the rostral visible from above is as long as its distance from the frontal. The internasals are shorter than the prefrontals. The frontal is as long as broad, slightly more than twice as broad as the small supraocular. There are two postoculars, in contact with the anterior temporal. The temporals are arranged 1+1. There are seven upper labials, the third and fourth entering the eye. There are four lower labials in contact with the anterior chin shield. The anterior chin shields are slightly longer than the posterior chin shields.

== Reproduction ==
H. wilsonii is oviparous.

== Etymology ==
The specific name or epithet, wilsonii, is in honor of "Mr. H. Wilson" (Rev. Henry Wilson, a missionary in the Congo), who presented the first specimen, which became the holotype, to the British Museum (Natural History).

== See also ==
- Snakebite
