= Chilorhinophis =

Scientific classification
- Kingdom: Animalia
- Phylum: Chordata
- Class: Reptilia
- Order: Squamata
- Suborder: Serpentes
- Family: Atractaspididae
- Subfamily: Aparallactinae
- Genus: Chilorhinophis; F. Werner, 1907

Genus of snakes

Common name: two-headed snakes.

Chilorhinophis is a genus of mildly venomous snakes endemic to Africa. Currently, three species are recognized.

== Species ==
Genus Chilorhinophis -- 3 species
Species	Taxon author	Subspecies*	Common name	Geographic range
C. butleri^{T}	F. Werner, 1907	————	Butler's two-headed snake	Africa: Mongalla, South Sudan.
C. carpenteri	(Parker, 1927)	liwalensis	Liwale two-headed snake	Africa: Mozambique, southeastern Tanzania.
C. gerardi	(Boulenger, 1913)	tanganyikae	Gerard's black and yellow burrowing snake	Africa: southern Democratic Republic of the Congo, Zambia, Zimbabwe, Tanzania.

*) Not including the nominate subspecies. ^{T}) Type species.

== See also ==
- Snakebite
