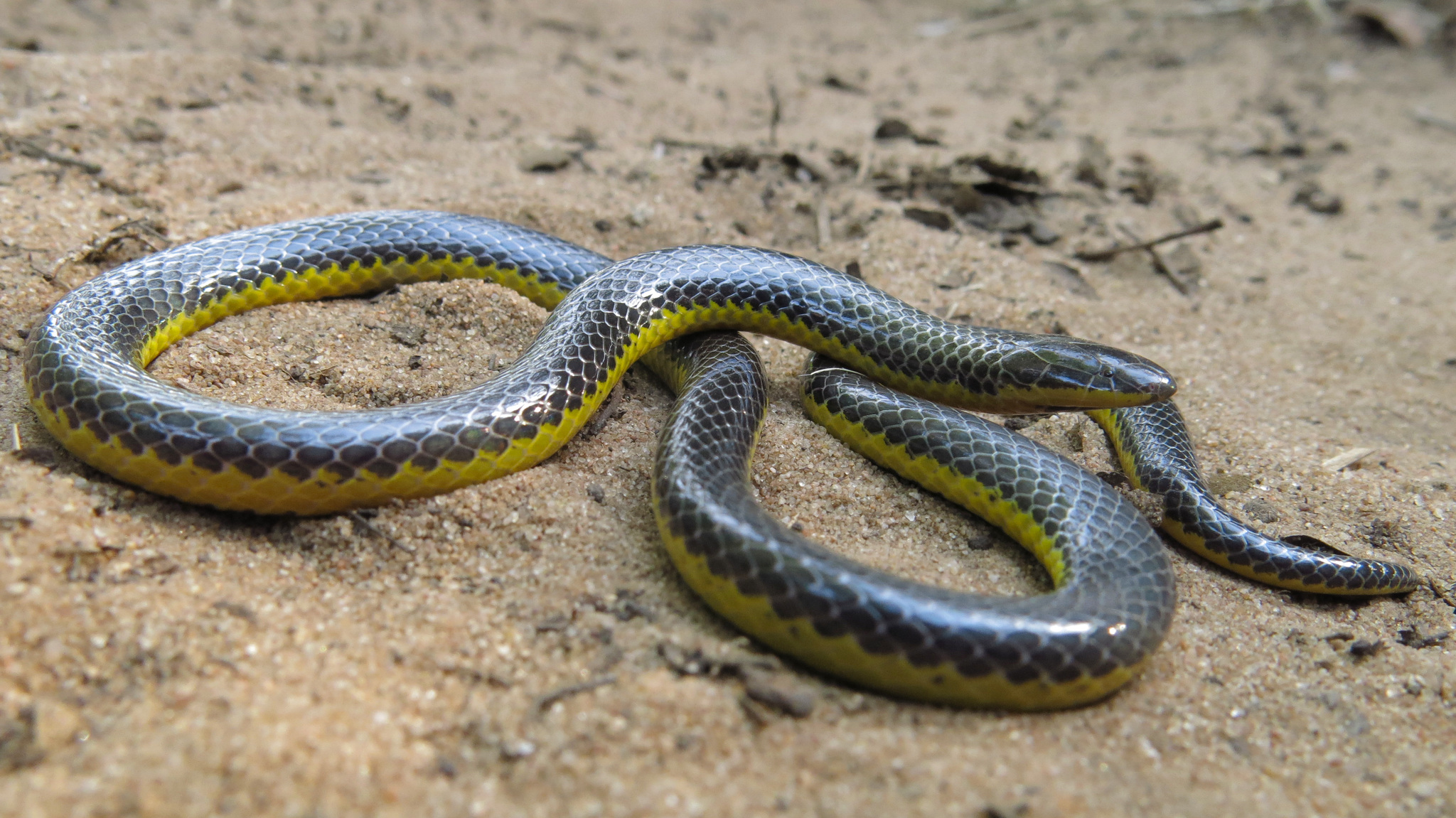
- Eastern purple-glossed snake

Conservation status
- Least Concern (IUCN 3.1)

Scientific classification
- Kingdom: Animalia
- Phylum: Chordata
- Class: Reptilia
- Order: Squamata
- Suborder: Serpentes
- Family: Atractaspididae
- Genus: Amblyodipsas
- Species: A. microphthalma

Binomial name
- Amblyodipsas microphthalma (Bianconi, 1852)

Synonyms
- Calamaria micropthalma Bianconi, 1852; Amblyodipsas micropthalma – Jan, 1865

= Amblyodipsas microphthalma =

Species of snake

Amblyodipsas microphthalma, also known as the eastern purple-glossed snake or white-lipped snake, is a species of mildly venomous rear-fanged snake in the Atractaspididae family.

== Geographic range ==
It is found in southern Mozambique and the northeastern Republic of South Africa.

== Description ==
Dorsally dark brown. Ventrally white, including chin and tail, with a dark brown stripe down the middle of the belly. The white of the outer edges of the ventrals extends onto the adjacent first two rows of dorsal scales on each side of the body.

Rostral broader than long, portion visible from above two-thirds its distance from the frontal. Frontal large, nearly twice as long as broad, acutely pointed behind, much longer than its distance from the end of the snout. Only four upper labials, second and third entering the eye, fourth largest and in contact with the parietal.

Dorsal scales smooth, without pits, arranged in 15 rows. Ventrals 142; anal plate divided; subcaudals 19, divided.

Total length 30 cm (11 3/4 in); tail 24 mm (1 in).
