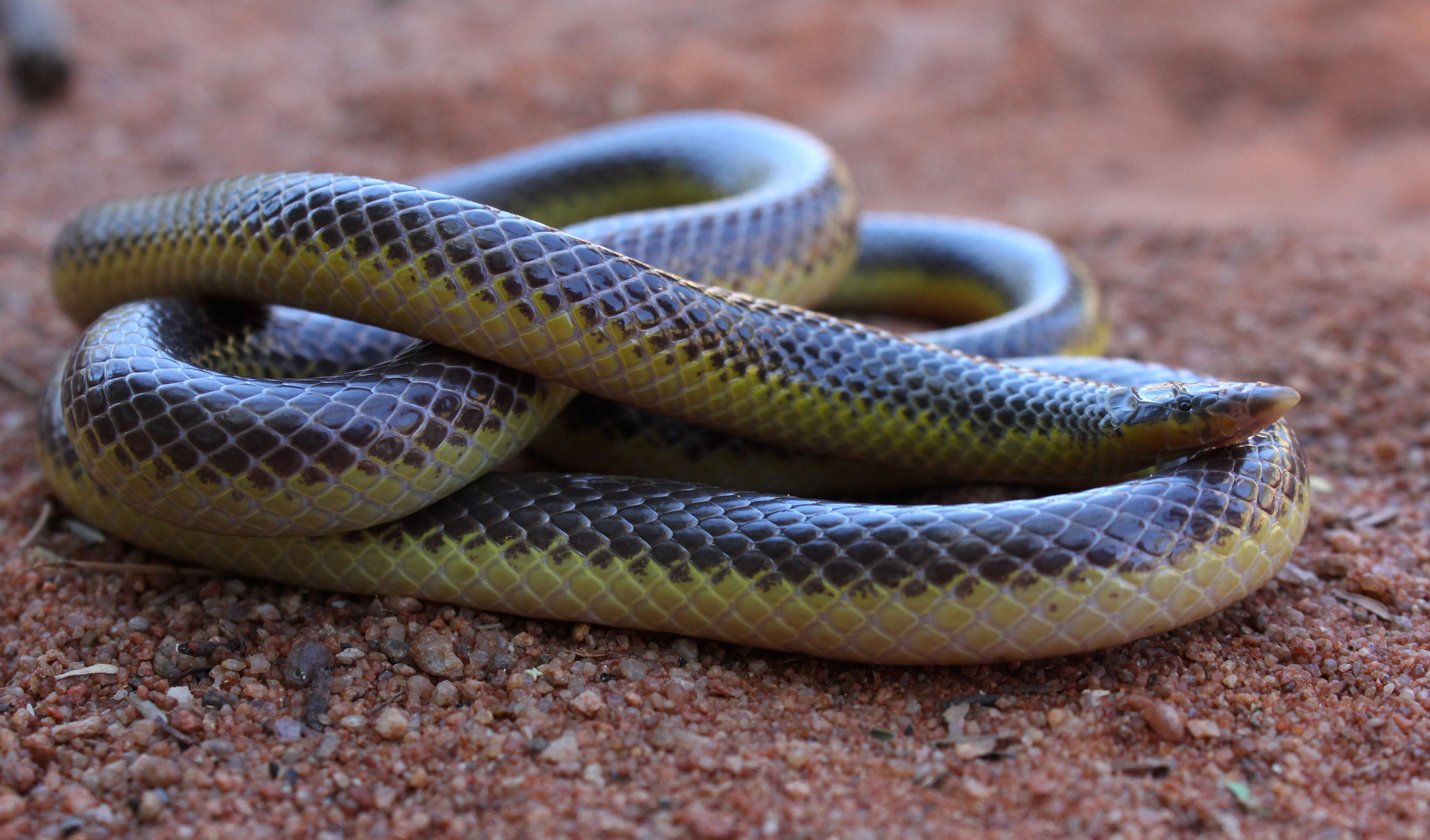
- Subspecies X. bicolor bicolor

Conservation status
- Least Concern (IUCN 3.1)

Scientific classification
- Kingdom: Animalia
- Phylum: Chordata
- Class: Reptilia
- Order: Squamata
- Suborder: Serpentes
- Family: Atractaspididae
- Genus: Xenocalamus
- Species: X. bicolor

Binomial name
- Xenocalamus bicolor Günther, 1868

= Xenocalamus bicolor =

Species of snake

Xenocalamus bicolor, also known commonly as the bicoloured quill-snouted snake and the slender quill-snouted snake, is a species of mildly venomous rear-fanged snake in the family Atractaspididae. The species is endemic to Africa. Four subspecies are recognized as being valid.

== Geographic range ==
X. bicolor is found in Angola, Botswana, Democratic Republic of the Congo, Mozambique, Namibia, Republic of South Africa, and Zimbabwe.

== Habitat ==
The preferred natural habitat of X. bicolor is savanna, at altitudes of 900–1,400 m (3,000–4,600 ft).

== Description ==
X. bicolor exhibits the following characters:

Black dorsally. White ventrally including the upper lip and the first two rows of dorsal scales on each side.

Total length 43 cm (16 7/8 in); tail 3 cm (1 1/8 in).

Dorsal scales smooth, without apical pits, arranged in 17 rows. Ventrals 218; anal plate divided; subcaudals 24, also divided.

Portion of rostral visible from above nearly half as long as the frontal. Frontal extremely large, more than half as long as the shielded part of the head. Internasals large, forming a short median suture. Supraocular very narrow. One large elongate preocular, contacting the posterior nasal, the internasal, the frontal, and the third upper labial. One minute postocular. One temporal. Six upper labials, the first very small, third and fourth entering the eye, the fifth very large and contacting the parietal. One pair of narrow chin shields. Three lower labials in contact with the chin shield. Third lower labial extremely large.

(Nota bene: the description above is a description of the species X. bicolor. The subspecies listed below vary somewhat from this description.)

== Subspecies ==
Four subspecies are recognized including the nominate race.

- Xenocalamus bicolor australis V. FitzSimons, 1946
- Xenocalamus bicolor bicolor Günther, 1868
- Xenocalamus bicolor lineatus Roux, 1907
- Xenocalamus bicolor machadoi Laurent, 1954

== Behaviour ==
X. bicolor is terrestrial and fossorial, burrowing in aeolian and alluvial sands.

== Diet ==
X. bicolor preys predominately upon amphisbaenians.

== Reproduction ==
X. bicolor is oviparous. Eggs are laid in December. Clutch size is 3–4 eggs. The eggs are elongate, approximately 4.5 cm × 1.5 cm (1.77 in × 0.59 in). Each hatchling has a total length (including tail) of 20 cm (7.9 in).
