= Venomous snake =

Species of the suborder Serpentes that produce venom

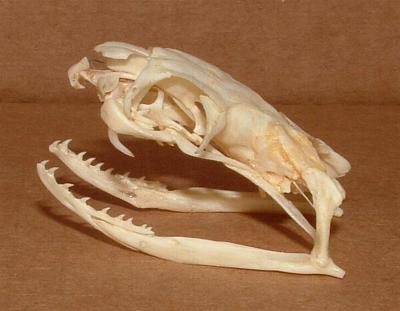
The lateral view of a king cobra's skull showing fangs

Venomous snakes are species of the suborder Serpentes that are capable of producing venom, which they use for killing prey, for defense, and to assist with digestion of their prey. The venom is typically delivered by injection using hollow or grooved fangs, although some venomous snakes lack well-developed fangs. Common venomous snakes include the families Elapidae, Viperidae, Atractaspididae, and some of the Colubridae. The toxicity of venom is mainly indicated by murine LD_{50}, while multiple factors are considered to judge the potential danger to humans. Other important factors for risk assessment include the likelihood that a snake will bite, the quantity of venom delivered with the bite, the efficiency of the delivery mechanism, and the location of a bite on the body of the victim. Snake venom may have both neurotoxic and hemotoxic properties. There are about 600 venomous snake species in the world.

== Evolution ==
The evolutionary history of venomous snakes can be traced back to as far as 28 million years ago. Snake venom is modified saliva used for prey immobilization and self-defense and is usually delivered through highly specialized teeth, hollow fangs, directly into the bloodstream or tissue of the target. Evidence has recently been presented for the Toxicofera hypothesis, that venom was present (in small amounts) in the ancestors of all snakes (as well as several lizard families) as "toxic saliva" and evolved to extremes in those snake families normally classified as venomous by parallel evolution.

== Taxonomy ==
There is not a single or special taxonomic group for venomous snakes. Venom is known in several families. This has been interpreted to mean venom in snakes originated more than once as the result of convergent evolution. Around a quarter of all snake species are identified as being venomous.

Family	Description
Atractaspididae (atractaspidids)	Purple-glossed snakes, centipede eaters, burrowing asps, Revoil's short snake, Chilorhinophis, Hypoptophis, Homoroselaps, Macrelaps, Micrelaps, and more.
Colubridae (colubrids)	Most are harmless, but others have potent venom and at least five species, including the boomslang, have caused human fatalities.
Elapidae (elapids)	Sea snakes, taipans, brown snakes, coral snakes, kraits, death adders, tiger snakes, mambas, king cobras, cobras and more.
Viperidae (viperids)	True vipers, including the Russell's viper, saw-scaled vipers, puff adders and pit vipers, including rattlesnakes, lanceheads and copperheads and cottonmouths.

== Terminology ==
Venomous snakes are often said to be poisonous, but poison and venom are not synonymous. Poisons must be ingested, inhaled or absorbed, while venom must be injected into the body by mechanical means. While unusual, there are a few species of snake that are actually poisonous. Keelback snakes are both venomous and poisonous – their poisons are stored in nuchal glands and are acquired by sequestering toxins from poisonous toads the snakes eat. Similarly, certain garter snakes from Oregon can retain toxins in their livers from ingesting rough-skinned newts.

== Danger ==
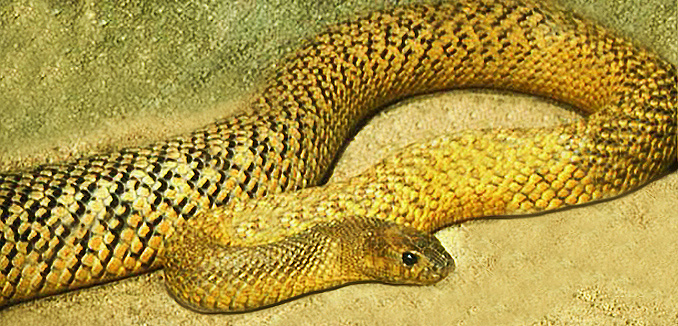
The world's most venomous snake, based on LD_{50}, is the inland taipan of Australia.

=== Toxicity issues ===
Venom toxicities are compared by looking at the median lethal dose (usually using rodents as test animals and termed the murine LD_{50}), which is the dose of venom per unit body mass that kills half of the test animals that receive it. The result obtained depends on which of the four delivery sites is used for the injection: subcutis (SC), vein (IV), muscle or peritoneum (IP). Smaller murine LD_{50} values indicate venoms that are more toxic, and there have been numerous studies on snake venom with a variability of potency estimates. SC LD_{50} is considered the most applicable to actual bites as only vipers with large fangs (such as large specimens from the genera Bitis, Bothrops, Crotalus, or Daboia) are capable of a truly intramuscular bite, snakebites rarely cause IV envenomation, and IP envenomation is even rarer. Measurements of LD_{50} using dry venom mixed with 0.1% bovine serum albumin in saline are more consistent than the results obtained using saline alone. As an example, the venom of the eastern brown snake has a murine LD_{50} (SC) of 41 μg/kg when measured in 0.1% bovine serum albumin in saline; when saline alone is used, the value is 53 μg/kg.

Belcher's sea snake, which sometimes is mistakenly called the hook-nosed sea snake, has been erroneously popularized as the most venomous snake in the world, due to the first edition of Ernst and Zug's book, Snakes in Question: The Smithsonian Answer Book, published in 1996. Prominent venom expert Associate Professor Bryan Grieg Fry has clarified the error: "The hook nosed myth was due to a fundamental error in a book called Snakes in Question. In there, all the toxicity testing results were lumped in together, regardless of the mode of testing (e.g., subcutaneous vs. intramuscular vs. intravenous vs. intraperitoneal). As the mode can influence the relative number, venoms can only be compared within a mode. Otherwise, it's apples and rocks." Belcher's sea snake's actual LD_{50} (IM) is 0.24 mg/kg and 0.155 mg/kg. Studies on mice and human cardiac cell culture show that venom of the inland taipan is the most toxic among all snakes.

Most venomous snakes of the world
Snake	Region	subcutaneous injection LD_{50}		intravenous injection LD_{50}
Snake	Region	0.1% bovine serum albumin in saline	in saline	intravenous injection LD_{50}
Inland taipan	Australia	0.01 mg/kg	0.025 mg/kg	N/A
Dubois' sea snake	Coral Sea, Arafura Sea, Timor Sea, and Indian Ocean	N/A	0.044 mg/kg	N/A
Eastern brown snake	Australia, Papua New Guinea, Indonesia	0.041 mg/kg	0.053 mg/kg	0.01 mg/kg
Yellow-bellied sea snake	Tropical oceanic waters	N/A	0.067 mg/kg	N/A
Peron's sea snake	Gulf of Siam, Taiwan Strait, Coral Sea Islands, and other places	N/A	0.079 mg/kg	N/A
Coastal taipan	Australia	0.064 mg/kg	0.105 mg/kg	0.013 mg/kg
Many-banded krait	Mainland China, Taiwan, Vietnam, Laos, Burma	N/A	0.108 mg/kg	0.061 mg/kg
Black-banded sea krait	eastern coast of the Malay Peninsula and Brunei, and in Halmahera, Indonesia	N/A	0.111 mg/kg	N/A
Black tiger snake	Australia	0.099 mg/kg	0.131 mg/kg	N/A
Mainland tiger snake	Australia	0.118 mg/kg	0.118 mg/kg	0.014 mg/kg
Western Australian Tiger snake	Australia	0.124 mg/kg	0.194 mg/kg	N/A
Beaked sea snake	Tropical Indo-Pacific	0.164 mg/kg	0.1125 mg/kg	N/A

=== Other factors ===
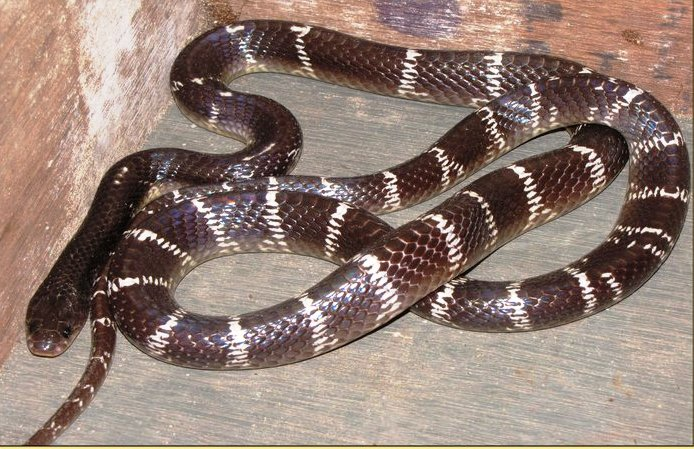
Common krait (Bungarus caeruleus)

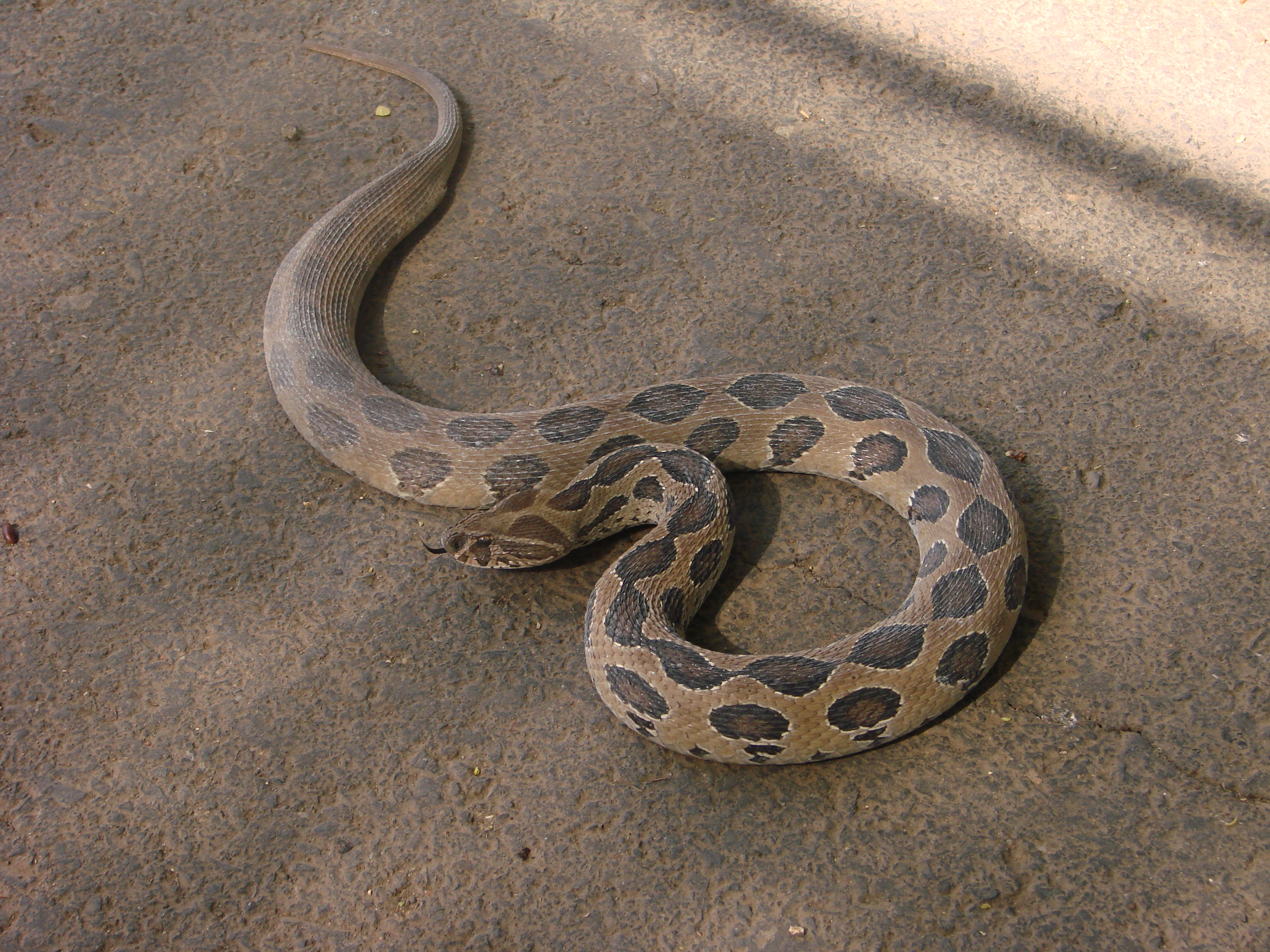
Russell's viper (Daboia russelii)

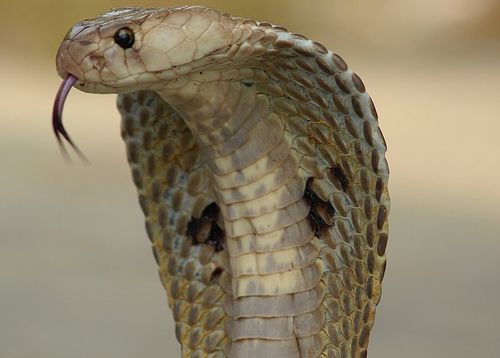
Indian cobra (Naja naja)

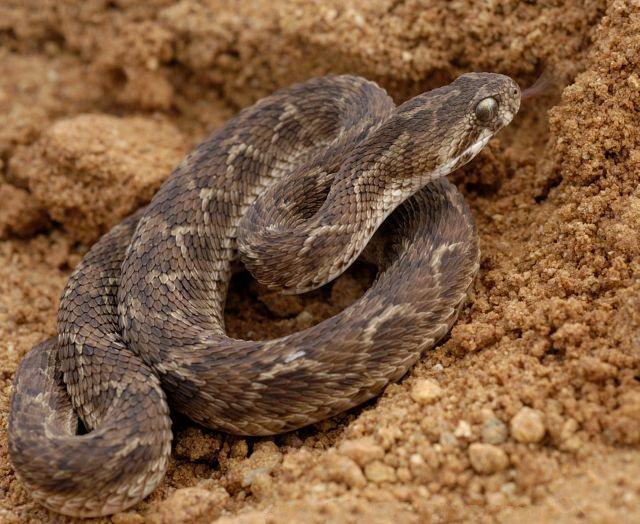
Saw-scaled viper (Echis carinatus)

The Big Four snakes responsible for most fatal bites on the Indian subcontinent

The toxicity of snake venom, based on laboratory tests conducted on mice, is sometimes used to gauge the extent of danger to humans, but this is not enough. Many venomous snakes are specialized predators whose venom may be adapted specifically to incapacitate their preferred prey. A number of other factors are also critical in determining the potential hazard of any given venomous snake to humans, including their distribution and behavior. For example, while the inland taipan is regarded as the world's most venomous snake based on LD_{50} tests on mice, it is a shy species and rarely strikes, and has not caused any known human fatalities. On the other hand, India's Big Four (Indian cobra, common krait, Russell's viper, and saw-scaled viper), while less venomous than the inland taipan, are found in closer proximity to human settlements and are more confrontational, thus leading to more deaths from snakebite. In addition, some species, such as the black mamba and coastal taipan, occasionally show some aggression, generally when alarmed or in self-defence, and then may deliver fatal doses of venom, resulting in high human mortality rates.

== See also ==
- List of dangerous snakes
- List of fatal snake bites in the United States
- List of fatal snake bites in Australia
- List of venomous animals
- Poisonous amphibians
- Snakebite
- Toxic birds
- Venomoid
- Venomous fish
- Venomous lizards
