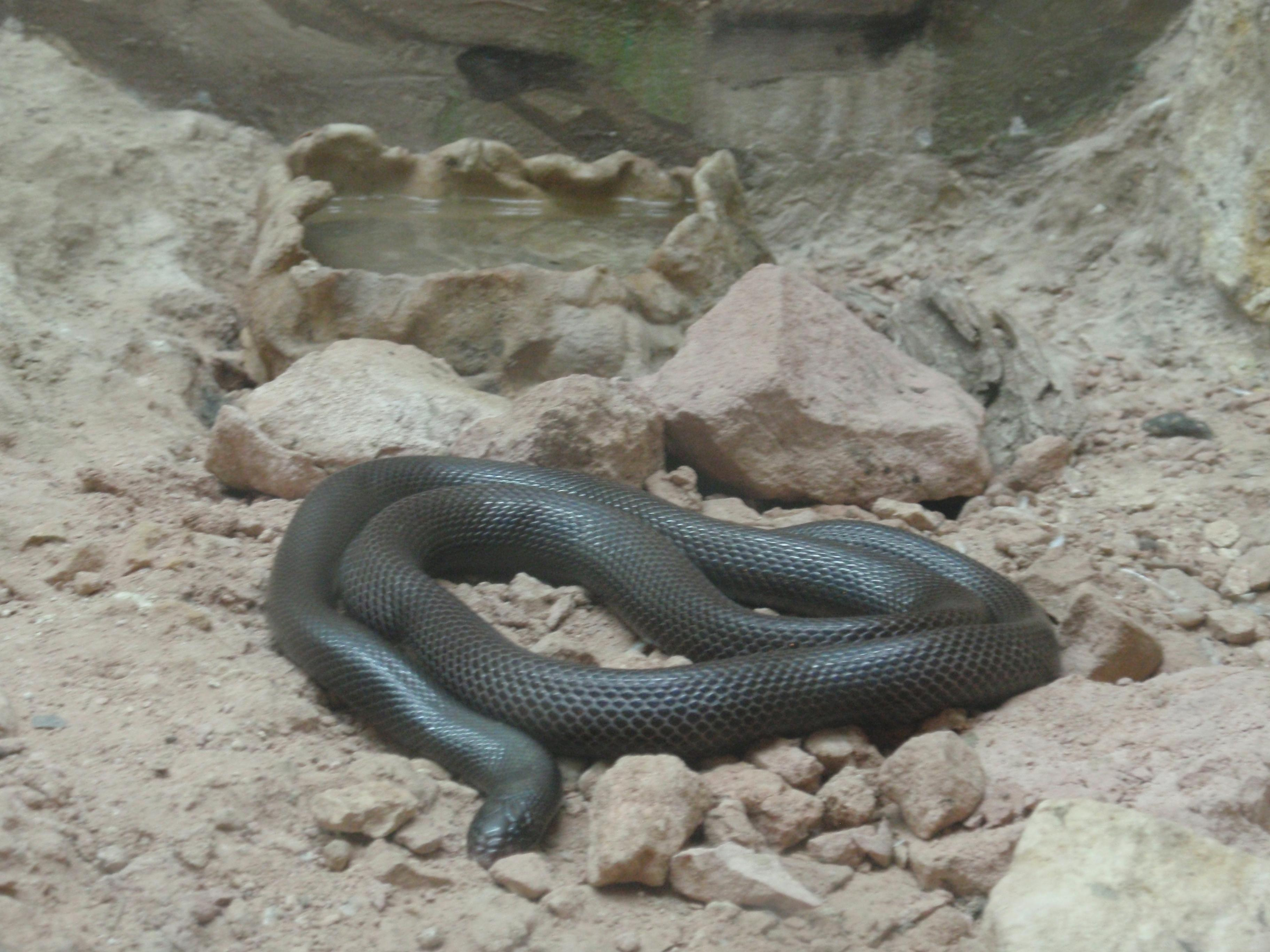
- Atractaspis engaddensis

Scientific classification
- Kingdom: Animalia
- Phylum: Chordata
- Class: Reptilia
- Order: Squamata
- Suborder: Serpentes
- Superfamily: Elapoidea
- Family: Atractaspididae; Günther, 1858

Synonyms
- Aparallactinae

= Atractaspididae =

Atractaspididae Temporal range: Pliocene - Present, 4.1–0 Ma

Family of snakes

The Atractaspididae (atractaspidids) are a family of venomous snakes found in Africa and the Middle East, commonly called mole vipers, stiletto snakes, or burrowing asps. Currently, 12 genera are recognized.

== Description ==
This family includes many genera formerly classed in other families and subfamilies, on the basis of fang type. It includes fangless (aglyphous), rear-fanged (opisthoglyphous), fixed-fanged (proteroglyphous), and hinge-fanged (solenoglyphous) species. Early molecular and physiological data linking this subfamily to others were ambiguous and often contradictory, which means the taxonomy of this subfamily has been highly contentious. The nominate family, Atractaspididae, has itself been moved to and from other taxa, such as potentially forming a trichotomy with Elapidae and Colubridae, reinforcing the ambiguity of this subfamily.

== Geographic range ==
This subfamily is found in Africa and the Middle East.

== Venom ==
Many of these snakes are inoffensive or far too small to envenomate a person effectively. However, some can inflict severe tissue necrosis; e.g. if the victim's thumb is bitten, the tip of that digit may be lost. Relapses may occur long after the bite. The bites of stiletto snakes are often exceptionally painful.

Very few deaths have resulted from accidents with these snakes, although large individuals of Atractaspis microlepidota and other long-glanded species are very likely to be dangerous. Some of the long-fanged species are able to stab their prey (or an unfortunate human) even while their mouths are closed, and the typical grasp used by herpetologists to securely hold venomous snakes is not safe for this group. This ability to stab sideways even with a closed mouth is the basis for an English name used for some of them: "side-stabbing snakes" or "side-stabbers".

== Genera ==
Subfamily Atractaspidinae -- 13 Genera
Genus	Taxon author	Species Count	Common name	Geographic range
Amblyodipsas	W. Peters, 1857	9	glossy snakes	Africa
Aparallactus	A. Smith, 1849	11	centipede-eaters	Africa
Atractaspis	A. Smith, 1849	15	burrowing asps, stiletto snakes	Africa, Middle-East
Brachyophis	Mocquard, 1888	1	Revoil's short snake	Africa
Chilorhinophis	F. Werner, 1907	3		Africa
Hypoptophis	Boulenger, 1908	1	African bighead snake	Africa
Homoroselaps	Jan, 1858	2	harlequin snakes	Southern Africa
Macrelaps	Boulenger, 1896	1	Natal black snake	Africa
Micrelaps	Boettger, 1880	4	two-headed snakes	Africa, Middle-East
Poecilopholis	Boulenger, 1903	1	Cameroon racer	Africa
Polemon	Jan, 1858	13	snake-eaters	Africa
Xenocalamus	Günther, 1868	5	quill-snouted snakes	Africa

== Taxonomy ==
This family was previously classified as a subfamily of the Colubridae: the Aparallactinae.

== Gallery ==
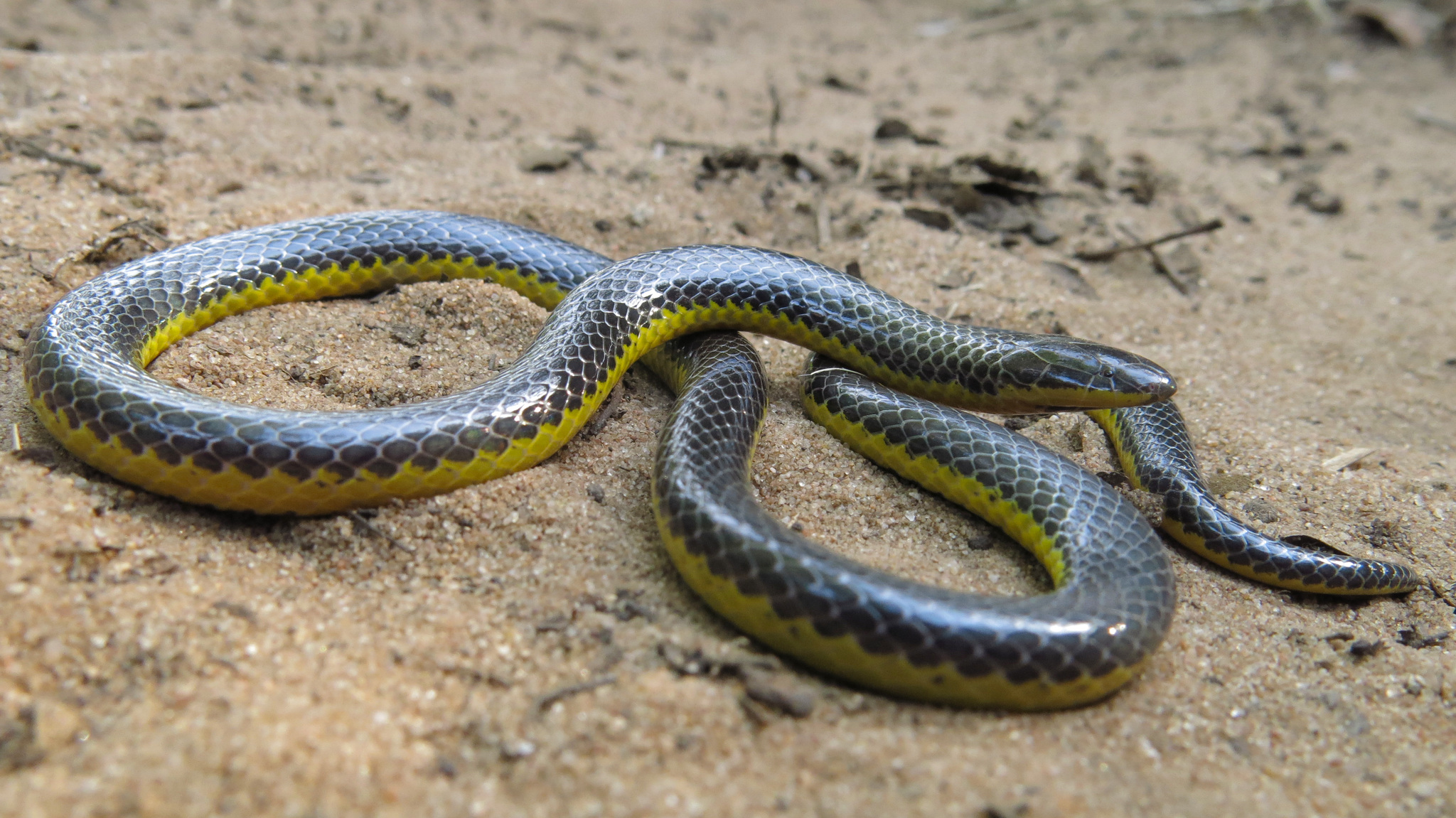
Amblyodipsas type species; eastern purple-glossed snake (A. microphthalma)

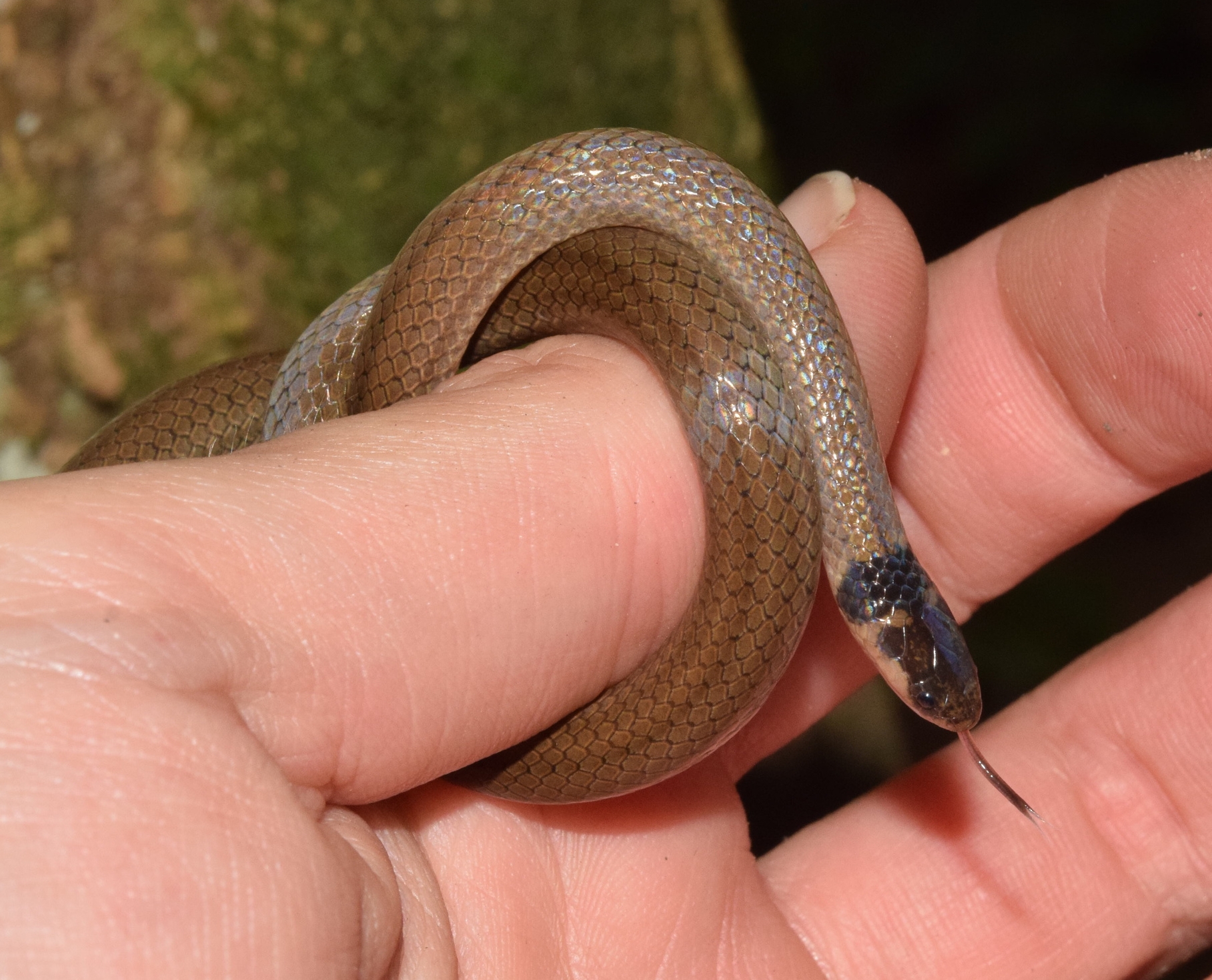
Aparallactus type species; Cape centipede-eater (A. capensis)

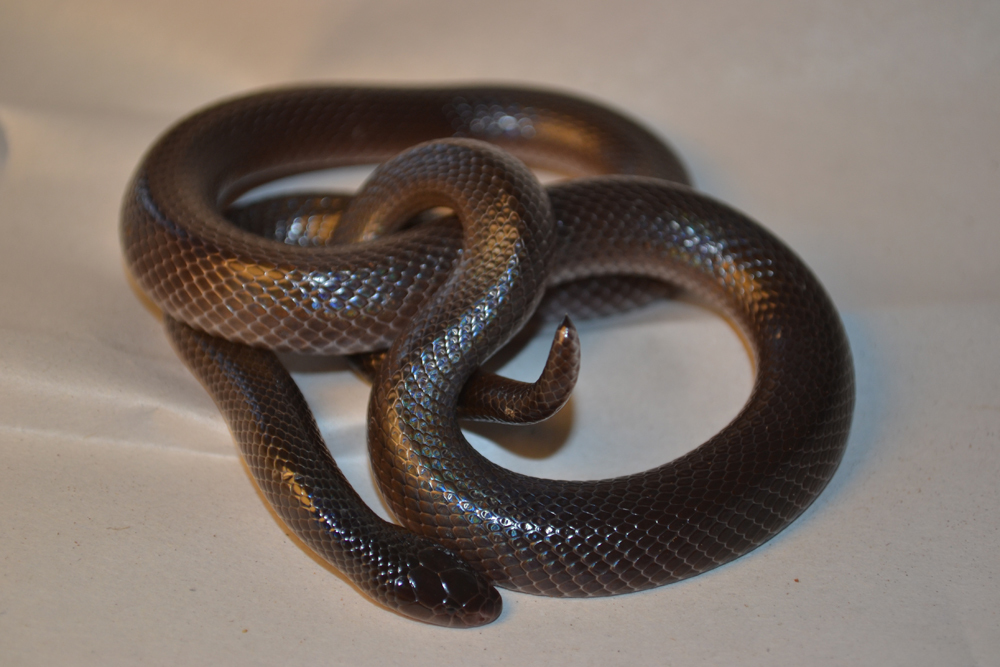
Atractaspis type species; southern stiletto snake (A. bibronii)

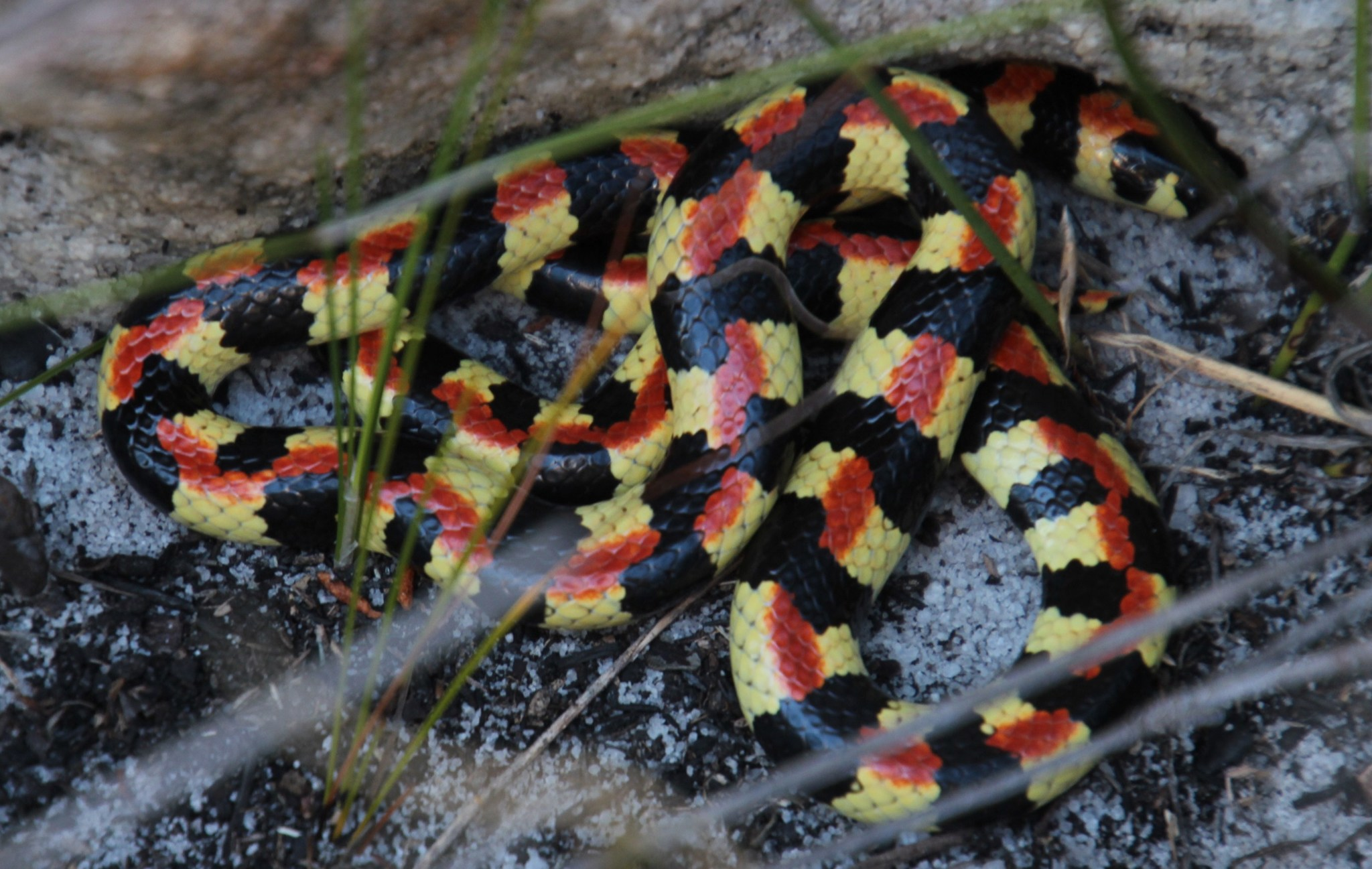
Homoroselaps type species; spotted harlequin snake (H. lacteus)

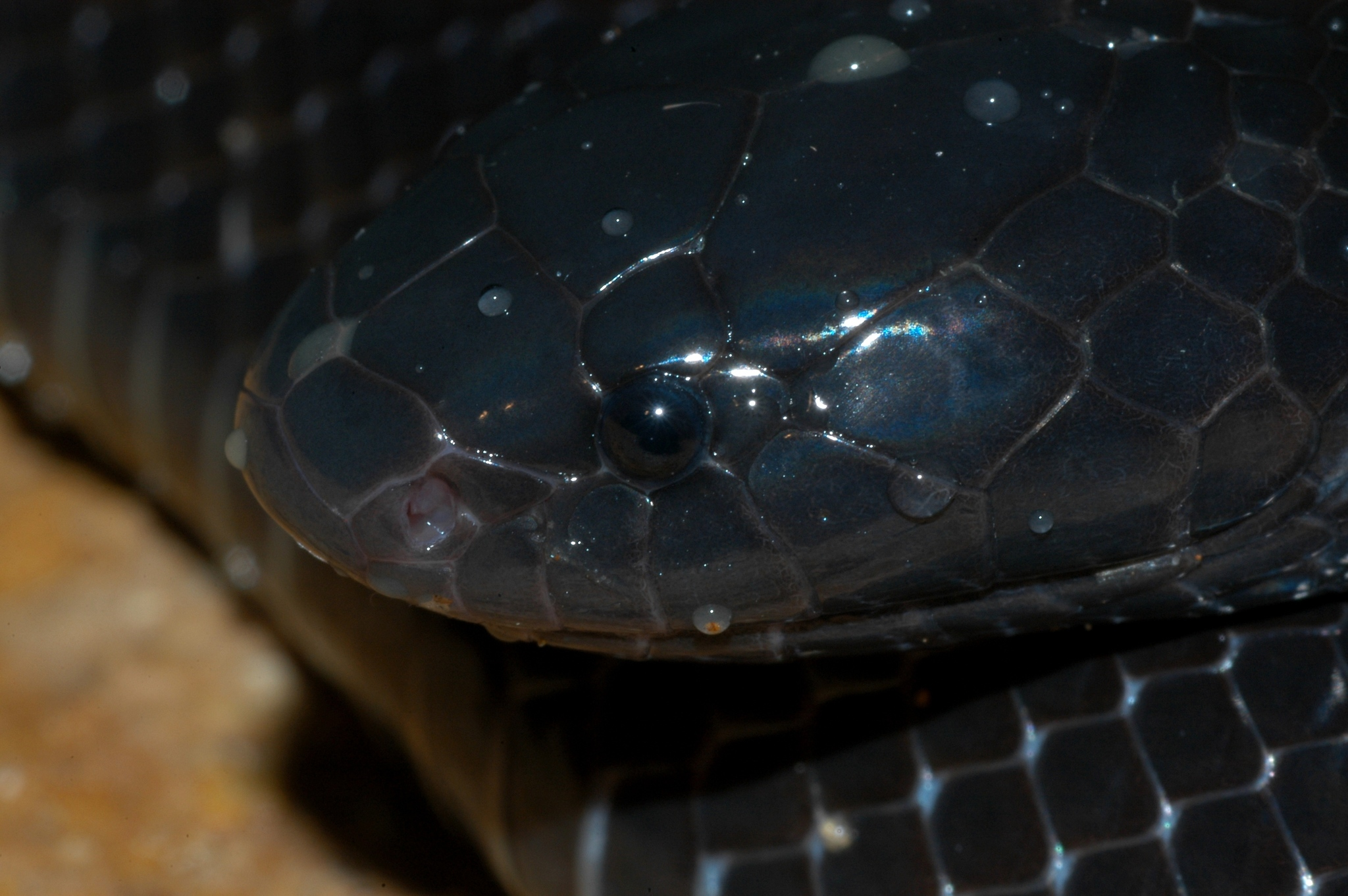
Macrelaps type species; Natal black snake (M. microlepidotus)

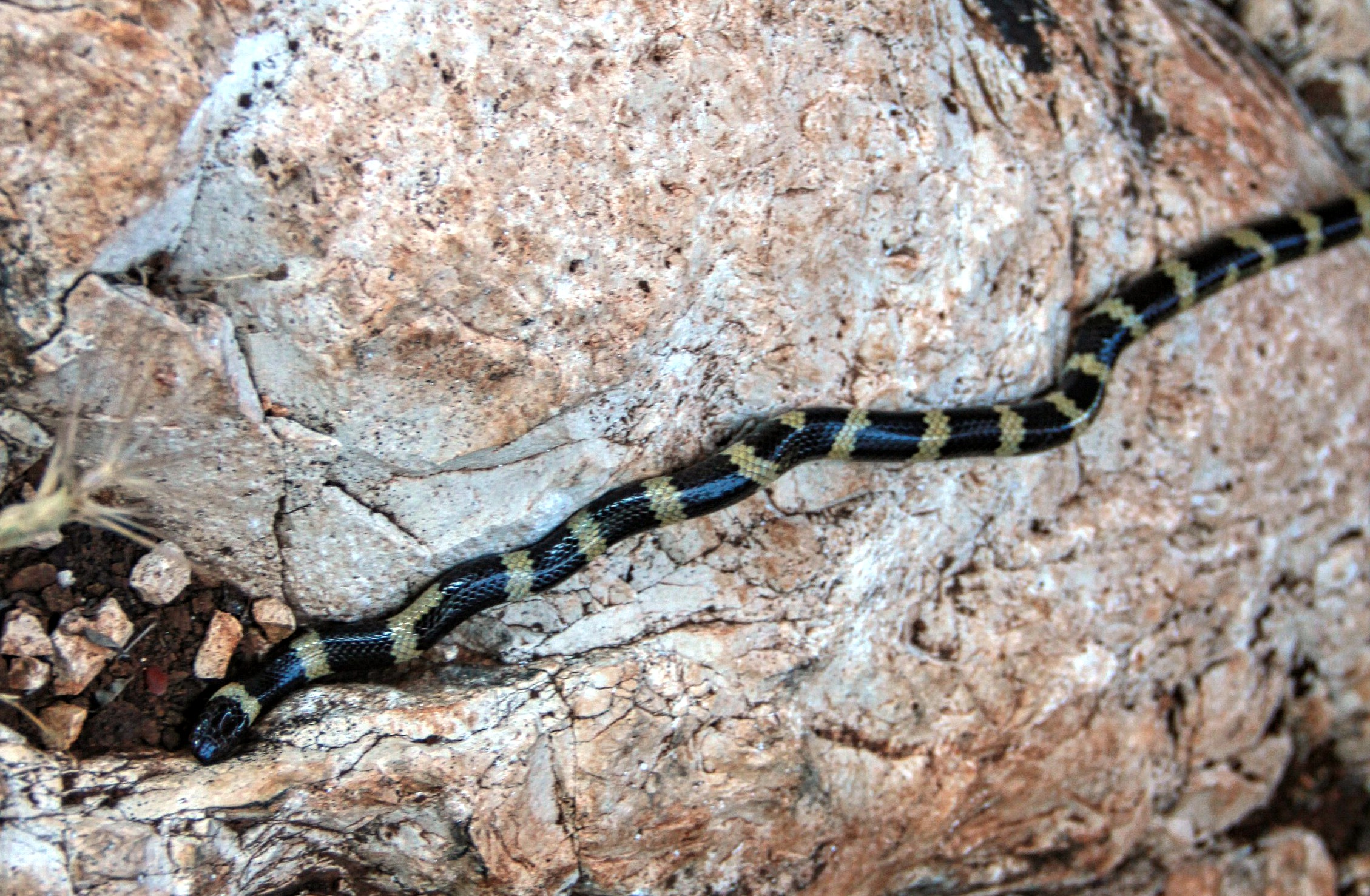
Micrelaps type species; Müller's snake (M. muelleri)

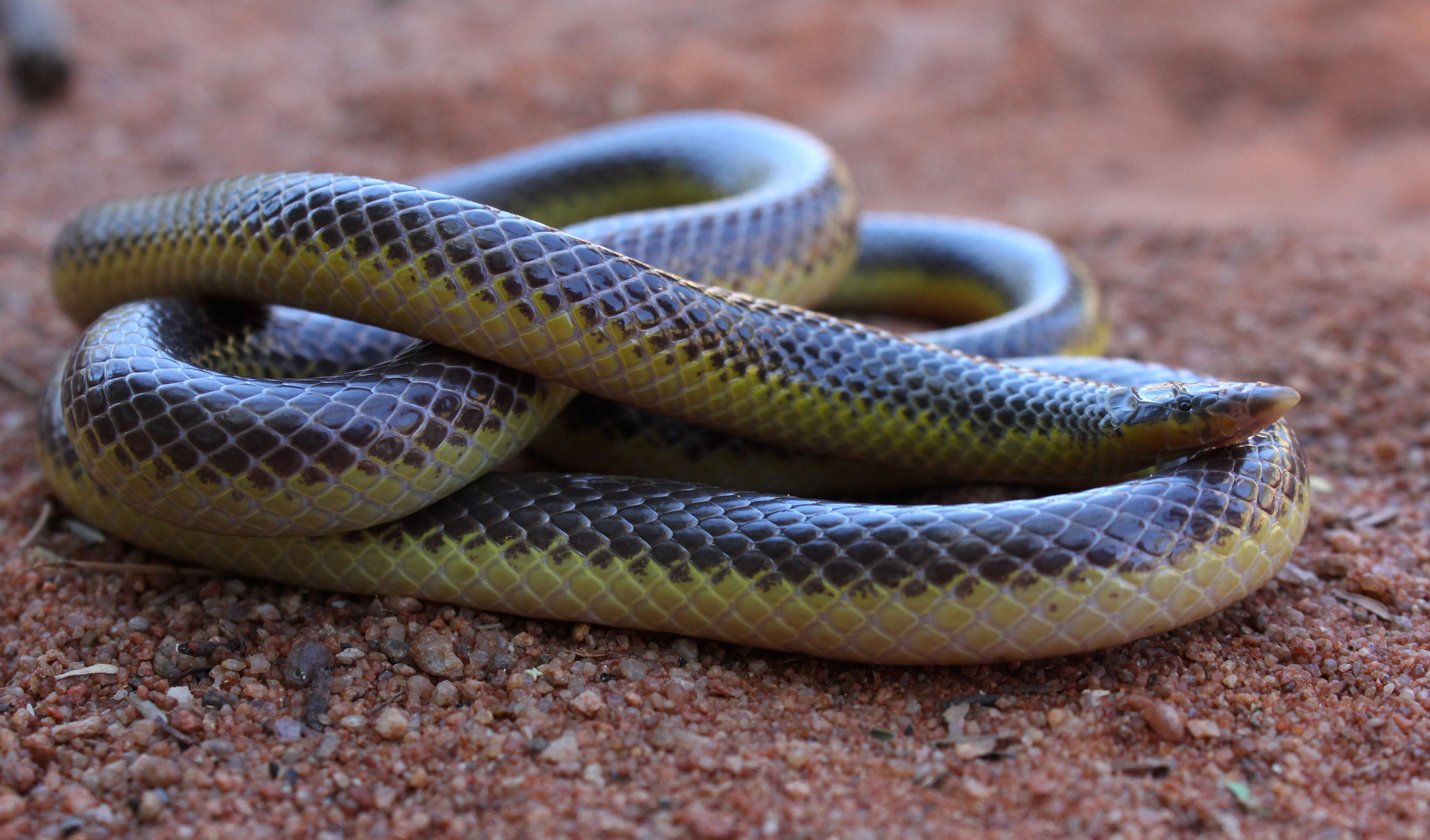
Xenocalamus type species; slender quill-snouted snake (X. bicolor)

== See also ==
- List of atractaspidid species and subspecies
