= Macrovipera razii =

Scientific classification
- Kingdom: Animalia
- Phylum: Chordata
- Class: Reptilia
- Order: Squamata
- Suborder: Serpentes
- Family: Viperidae
- Genus: Macrovipera
- Species: M. razii

Binomial name
- Macrovipera razii Oraie et al., 2018

Species of snake

Macrovipera razii, commonly known as Razi's viper, is a species of viper endemic to Iran. It is found near Lake Bakhtegan in the Fars Province and in the Kerman Province. Razi's viper has been named in honour of the tenth century polymath, physician, alchemist and philosopher Abu Bakr Muhammad ibn Zakariyya al-Razi.

== Description ==
Razi's viper can be distinguished from other Macrovipera species in many ways. It can be distinguished from M. lebetina (which it split from as a species 10.5 million years ago) in general by its longer anterior chin-shields and lower number of canthal and intersupraocular scales. However, it can be distinguished specifically from M. lebetina schweizeri by its 25 mid-dorsal scales compared to the 23 of M. lebetina schweizeri. It can also be distinguished specifically from M. lebetina lebetina and M. lebetina turanica by its larger number of ventral scales, as well as specifically from M. lebetina turanica by its supraoculars and colouring. M. razii is also specifically distinguishable from M. lebetina obtusa and M. lebetina euphratica by its one large supraocular scale, which it shares with M. lebetina cernovi.

== Diet ==
Razi's viper is carnivorous, with its diet generally consisting of birds such as the see-see partridge (Ammoperdix grisegularis).

== Habitat ==
In Kerman Province, Razi's viper's habitat is at an altitude of around 3,000 m (9,800 ft), while its habitat near Lake Bakhtegan is at an altitude of around 1,500 m (4,900 ft).

Razi's viper's habitat tends to be relatively dense with vegetation such as Orchis, Zygophyllum and Astragalus spp., as well as stones at the base of nearby hills.

Generally, Razi's viper's habitat tends to be a colder mountain climate. However, it has been found in a warmer and drier habitat near Lake Bakhtegan – closer to the climate of a desert.

== Reproduction ==
M. razii reproduces sexually and is oviparous, as with all Macrovipera sp.
