= Macrovipera lebetinus turanica =

Scientific classification
- Kingdom: Animalia
- Phylum: Chordata
- Class: Reptilia
- Order: Squamata
- Suborder: Serpentes
- Family: Viperidae
- Genus: Macrovipera
- Species: M. lebetinus
- Subspecies: M. l. turanica

Trinomial name
- Macrovipera lebetinus turanica (Chernov, 1940)

Synonyms
- Vipera lebetina turanica Chernov, 1940 In Terentjev & Chernov, 1940; Daboia (Daboia) lebetina turanica — Obst, 1983; Macrovipera lebetina turanica — Golay et al., 1993

Subspecies of snake

Common names: Turan blunt-nosed viper.

Macrovipera lebetinus turanica is a venomous viper subspecies endemic to Asia.

== Description ==
The dorsal color pattern consists of a dark ground color with a lighter, orange zigzag pattern. The supraoculars are usually semidivided.

== Geographic range ==
It is found in eastern Turkmenistan, Uzbekistan, Tajikistan, southwestern Kazakhstan, and parts of northern Afghanistan and western Pakistan.

== Venom ==
Not much is known about its venom but it contains procoagulants (fibrinogenases) and likely contains myotoxins. It's also possible that it contains hemorrhagins and cytotoxins. The average venom yield per bite is somewhere between 31 and 63 mg (dry weight). It has been known to have caused death in adult humans, and although the envenoming rate is unknown, it is suspected to be high. Symptoms of envenomation include variable non-specific effects which may include headache, nausea, vomiting, abdominal pain, diarrhea, dizziness, collapse, or convulsions. There are also marked local effects including pain, severe swelling, bruising, blistering, and moderate to severe necrosis. Other effects include moderate to severe coagulopathy and hemorrhagins causing extensive bleeding.
