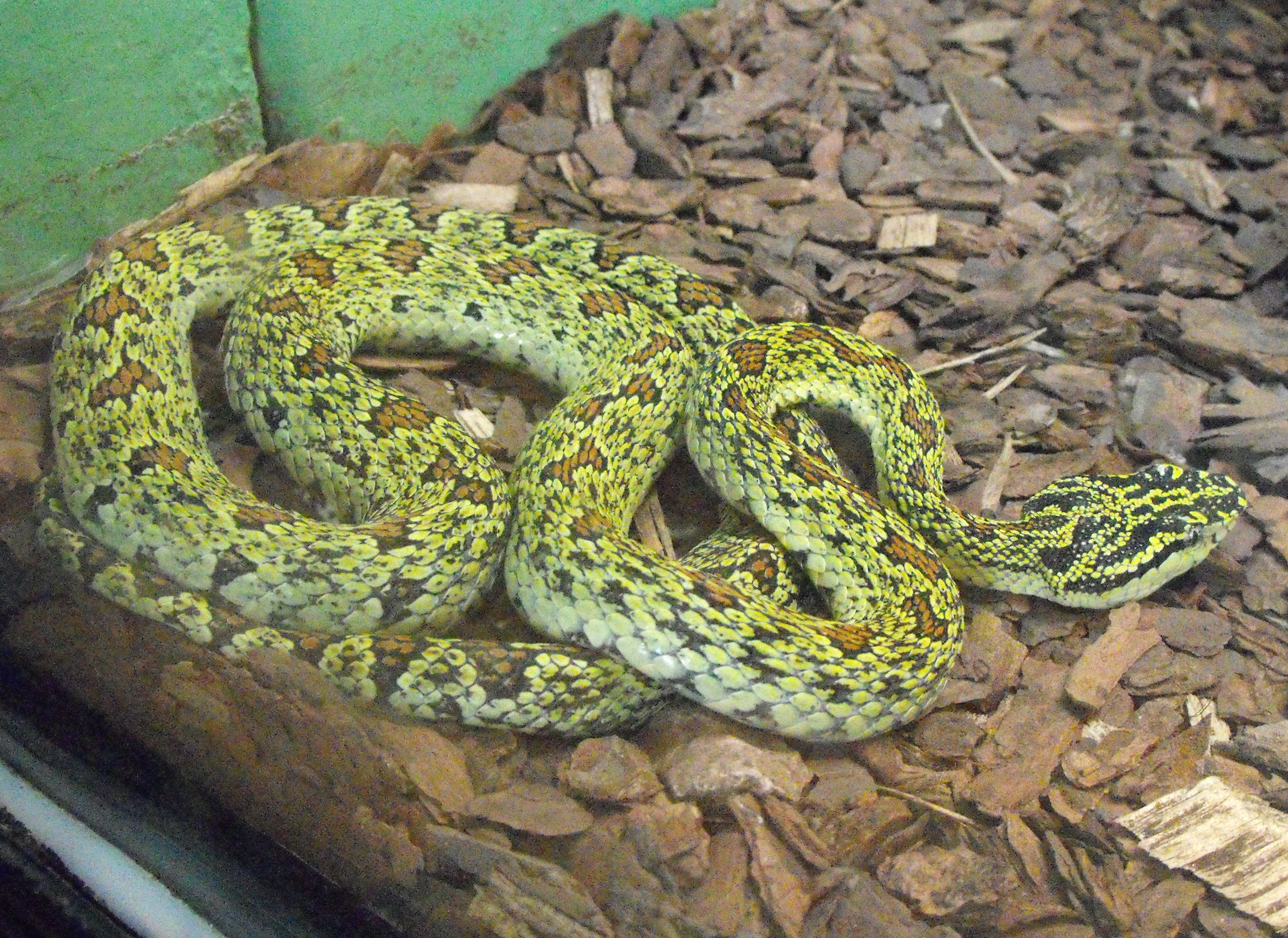
- at the San Diego Zoo

Conservation status
- Least Concern (IUCN 3.1)

Scientific classification
- Kingdom: Animalia
- Phylum: Chordata
- Class: Reptilia
- Order: Squamata
- Suborder: Serpentes
- Family: Viperidae
- Genus: Protobothrops
- Species: P. jerdonii

Binomial name
- Protobothrops jerdonii (Günther, 1875)
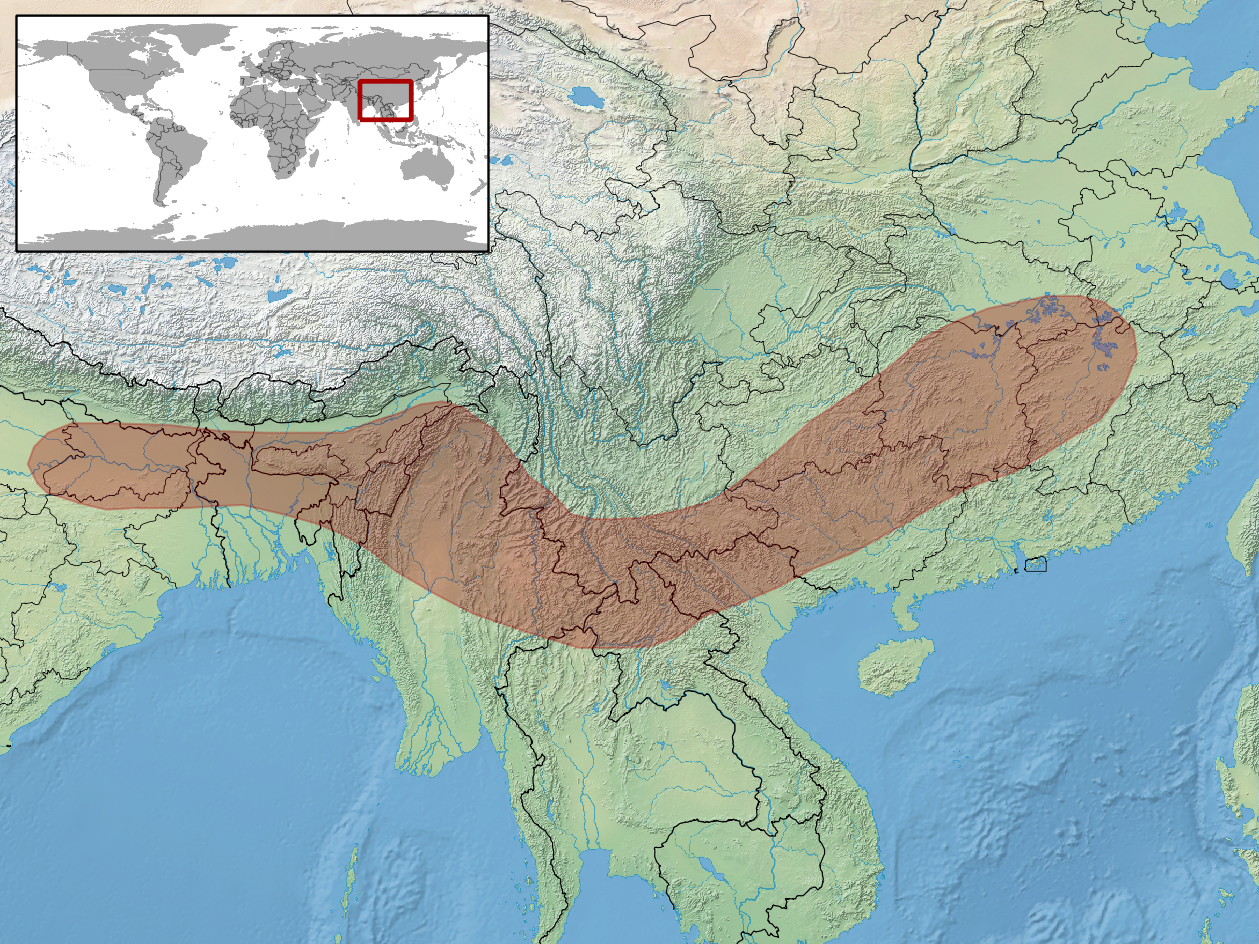

Synonyms
- Trimeresurus jerdonii Günther, 1875; Lachesis jerdonii — Boulenger, 1896; Lachesis melli K. Vogt, 1922; Trimeresurus jerdonii melli — Mell, 1931; T [rimeresurus]. j [erdonii ]. jerdonii — Bourret, 1936; Trimeresurus jerdoni — M.A. Smith, 1943; Trimeresurus jerdoni bourreti Klemmer, 1963; P [rotobothrops]. jerdoni — Hoge & Romano-Hoge, 1983; Protobothrops jerdonii jerdonii — Welch, 1988; Protobothrops jerdonii bourreti — Welch, 1988; Protobothrops jerdonii meridionalis — Welch, 1988; Protobothrops jerdonii xanthomelas — Welch, 1988; Trimeresurus jerdonii — R.C. Sharma, 2004

= Protobothrops jerdonii =

Species of venomous snake

Protobothrops jerdonii, also known commonly as Jerdon's pit viper, the yellow-speckled pit viper, and the oriental pit viper, is a species of venomous snake in the subfamily Crotalinae of the family Viperidae. The species is native to India, Nepal, Myanmar, China, and Vietnam. Three subspecies are recognized, including the nominate subspecies described here.

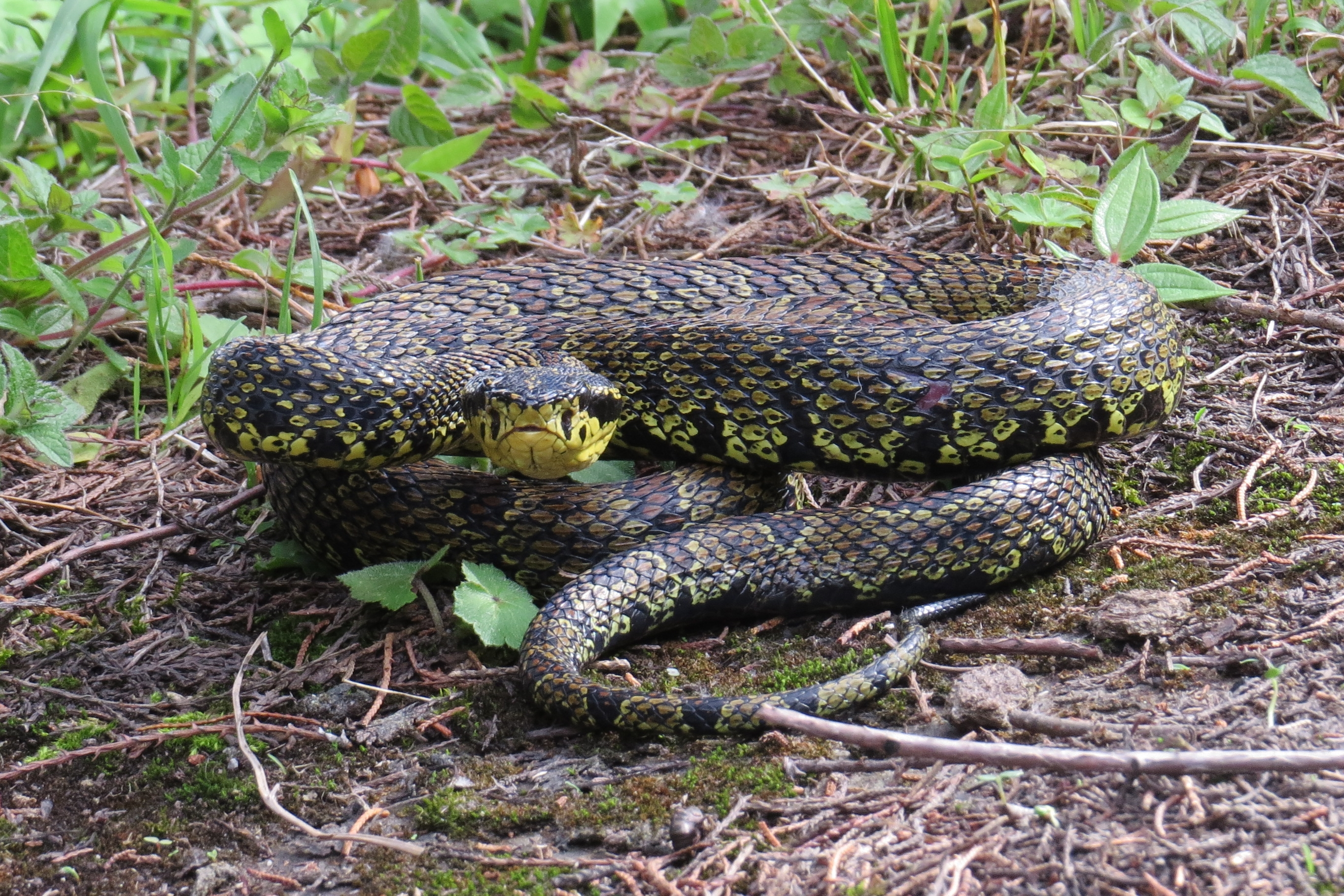
Jerdon's red spotted pit viper, P. j. xanthomelas, from West Kameng District, Arunachal Pradesh, India.

== Etymology ==
The specific name, jerdonii, is in honor of British herpetologist Thomas C. Jerdon, who collected the type series.

The subspecific name, bourreti, is in honour of French herpetologist René Léon Bourret.

== Description ==
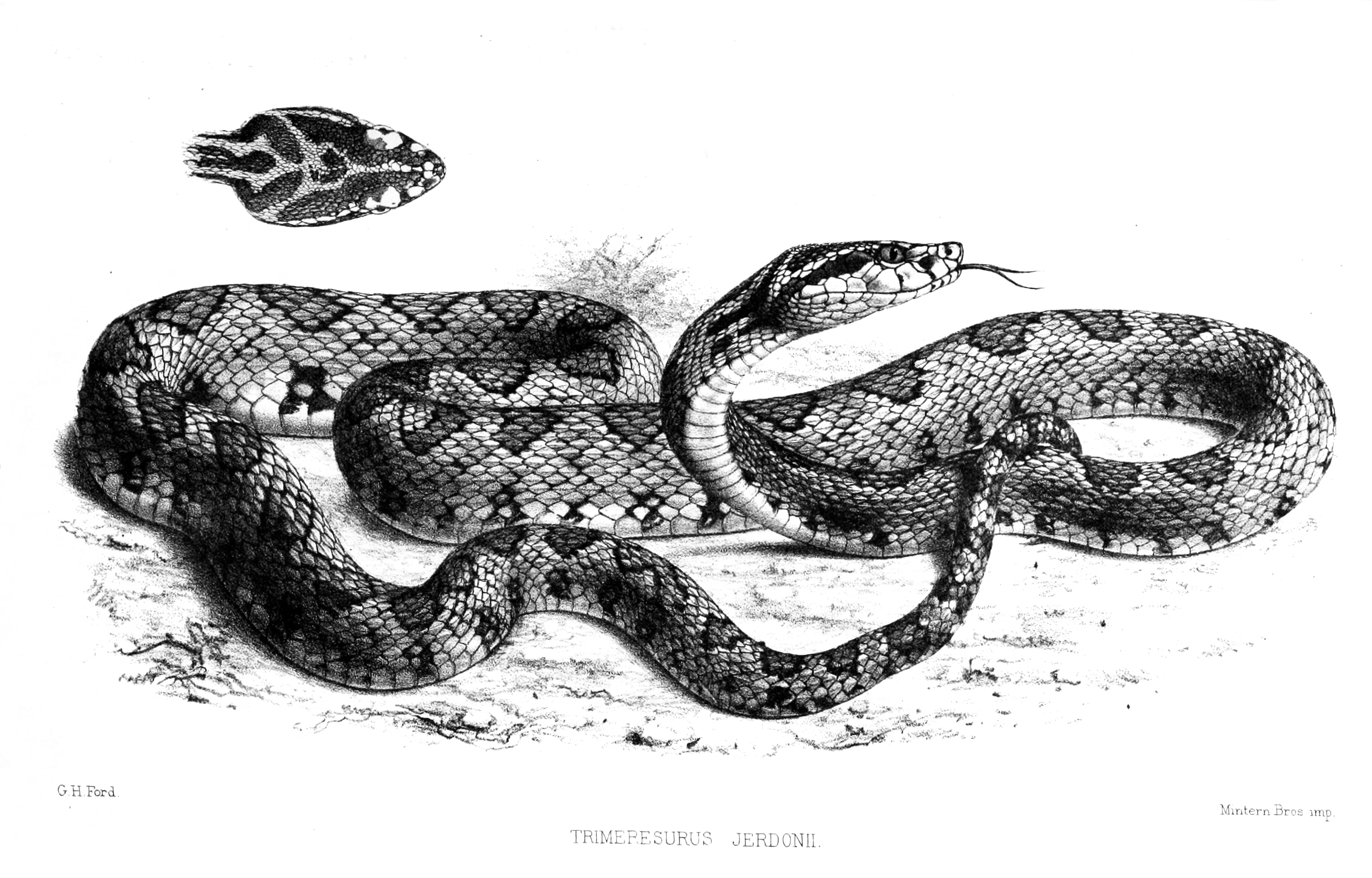
Protobothrops jerdonii, illustration by G.H. Ford (1875) for Günther's original description.

Males of P. jerdonii grow to a maximum total length of 835 mm (32.9 in), which includes a tail length of 140 mm (5.5 in); females grow to 990 mm (39 in), with a tail length of 160 mm (6.3 in).

Scalation: dorsal scales in 21 longitudinal rows at midbody (rarely 23); snout length a little more than twice diameter of eye; head above, except for large internasals and supraoculars, covered by small, unequal, smooth scales that are feebly imbricate or juxtaposed; first labial completely separated from nasal scales by a suture; internasals separated by 1–2 small scales; 6–9 small scales in line between supraoculars; 7–8 upper labials, third and fourth beneath eye, in contact with subocular or separated by at most a single series of small scales; ventrals: males 164–188, females 167–193; subcaudals: males 50–78, females 44–76.

== Geographic range ==
P. jerdonii is found in northeastern India, Nepal, through northern Burma to southwestern China and Vietnam. The type locality given by Günther is "Khassya" (=Khasi Hills, India).

== Habitat ==
The preferred natural habitats of P. jerdonii are forest, shrubland, and grassland, at altitudes of 1,400–2,300 m (4,600–7,500 ft).

== Diet ==
Adults of P. jerdonii prey predominately upon rats, while juveniles prey upon frogs of the families Ranidae and Rhacophoridae.

== Reproduction ==
The mode of reproduction of P. jerdonii has been referred to as viviparous and as ovoviviparous. Litter size is five to eight newborns.

== Subspecies ==
Subspecies	Taxon author	Common name	Geographic range
P. j. bourreti	(Klemmer, 1963)	Bourret's pitviper	Northwestern Vietnam (in the provinces of Lào Cai and Lai Châu, and possibly also in adjacent China (Yunnan).
P. j. jerdonii	(Günther, 1875)	Jerdon's pitviper	Southwestern China (in the provinces of southern Xizang (Tibet), western Sichuan and Yunnan), northeastern India, Bangladesh, Burma (Chin and Kachin state), and northeastern Nepal.
P. j. xanthomelas	(Günther, 1889)	red spotted pitviper	Central and southern China (in the provinces of Henan, Shaanxi, Gansu, Sichuan, Guizhou, Hubei and Guangxi) and northeastern India(Arunachal Pradesh).

Nota bene: A trinomial authority in parentheses indicates that the subspecies was originally described in a genus other than Protobothrops.
