= Macrovipera lebetinus cernovi =

Scientific classification
- Kingdom: Animalia
- Phylum: Chordata
- Class: Reptilia
- Order: Squamata
- Suborder: Serpentes
- Family: Viperidae
- Genus: Macrovipera
- Species: M. lebetinus
- Subspecies: M. l. cernovi

Trinomial name
- Macrovipera lebetinus cernovi (Chikin & Szczerbak, 1992)

Synonyms
- Vipera lebetina cernovi Chikin & Szczerbak, 1992; Macrovipera lebetina cernovi — McDiarmid, Campbell & Touré, 1999

Subspecies of snake

Macrovipera lebetinus cernovi, known as the Chernov blunt-nosed viper, is a viper subspecies endemic to Asia. Like all other vipers, it is venomous.

== Etymology ==
The subspecific name, cernovi, is in honor of Soviet herpetologist Sergius Aleksandrovich Chernov (1903–1964).

== Description ==
This subspecies normally has semidivided supraoculars.

== Geographic range ==
It is found in northeastern Iran, southern Turkmenistan, and parts of northern Afghanistan and Pakistan.
