= Macrovipera lebetinus transmediterranea =

Scientific classification
- Kingdom: Animalia
- Phylum: Chordata
- Class: Reptilia
- Order: Squamata
- Suborder: Serpentes
- Family: Viperidae
- Genus: Macrovipera
- Species: M. lebetinus
- Subspecies: M. l. transmediterranea

Trinomial name
- Macrovipera lebetinus transmediterranea (Nilson & Andrén, 1988)

Synonyms
- Vipera lebetina transmediterranea Nilson & Andrén, 1988; Macrovipera lebetina transmediterranea — Spawls & Branch, 1995

Subspecies of snake

Common names: (none).

Macrovipera lebetinus transmediterranea is a viper subspecies endemic to North Africa. Like all other vipers, it is venomous.

== Description ==
This subspecies is not known to exceed 1 m (3.3 ft) in total length (body + tail). It is further distinguished by having only 25 midbody dorsal scale rows, a lower ventral scale count of 150-164 scales, and more fragmented head scales. The color pattern is light gray with 34-41 dark transverse bars which are each 2-3 scales wide.

== Geographic range ==
It is found only in North Africa, where it is restricted to the coastal mountains of Algeria and Tunis. One of the few specific localities where it is known to occur is Djebel Murdjaro near Oran in western Algeria. This subspecies may be sympatric with M. deserti and/or D. mauritanica.
