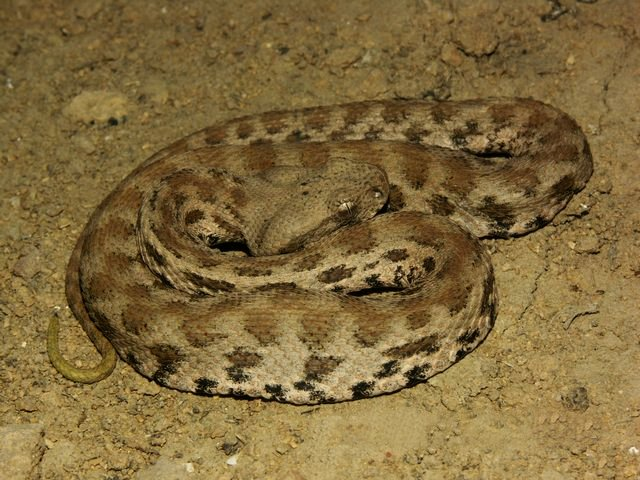

Scientific classification
- Kingdom: Animalia
- Phylum: Chordata
- Class: Reptilia
- Order: Squamata
- Suborder: Serpentes
- Family: Viperidae
- Genus: Macrovipera
- Species: M. lebetinus
- Subspecies: M. l. obtusa

Trinomial name
- Macrovipera lebetinus obtusa (Dwigubsky, 1832)

Synonyms
- Vipera obtusa Dwigubsky, 1832; Vipera lebetina obtusa — Terentjev & Chernov, 1940; Vipera lebetina obtusa — Minton, 1968; Daboia (Daboia) lebetina obtusa — Obst, 1983; Daboia lebetina obtusa — Engelmann et al., 1993; Macrovipera l [ebetina]. obtusa — Golay et al., 1993

= Macrovipera lebetinus obtusa =

Subspecies of snake

Common names: West-Asian blunt-nosed viper, Levant blunt-nosed viper.

Macrovipera lebetinus obtusa is a venomous viper subspecies endemic to Asia, from central Turkey to northern India.

== Description ==
It can be distinguished from other subspecies of M. lebetina by its higher scale counts — usually 170-175 ventrals, and 25 (sometimes 27) rows of dorsal scales at midbody — and relatively dark color pattern.

== Geographic range ==
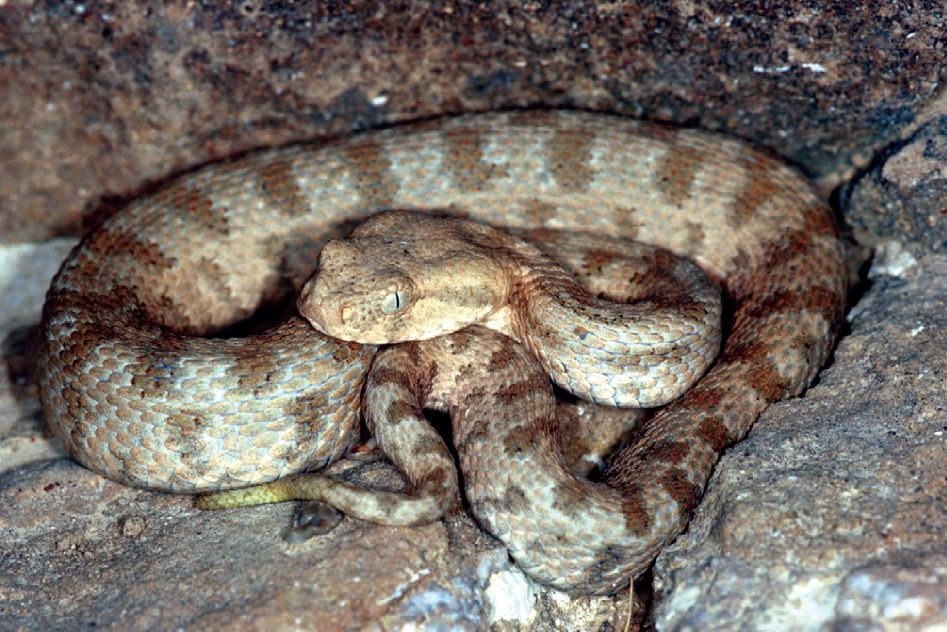
M. l. obtusa.

It is found from central Turkey through Syria, Lebanon, Iraq, northern Jordan, the Caucasus region (incl. Armenia, Azerbaijan, Dagestan and rarely Georgia), Iran, southern Afghanistan, Pakistan and Himalayan regions of India. In Pakistan, according to Khan (1983), M. lebetina is restricted to the western highlands; it is allopatric with Daboia russelii, which occurs in the Indus River valley.
