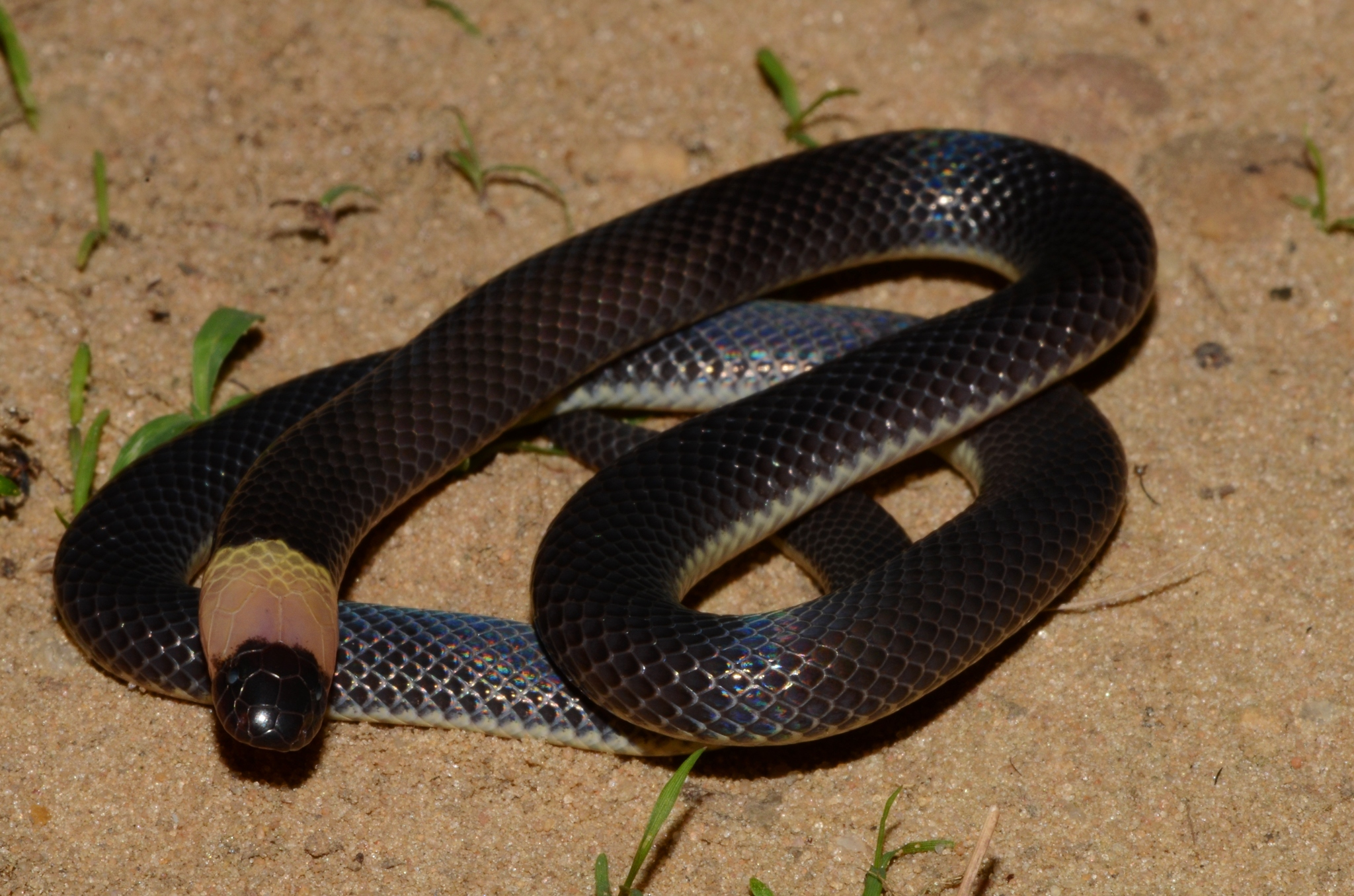

Conservation status
- Least Concern (IUCN 3.1)

Scientific classification
- Kingdom: Animalia
- Phylum: Chordata
- Class: Reptilia
- Order: Squamata
- Suborder: Serpentes
- Family: Atractaspididae
- Genus: Polemon
- Species: P. bocourti

Binomial name
- Polemon bocourti Mocquard, 1897

Synonyms
- Aparallactus Hagmanni Gough, 1902

= Polemon bocourti =

Species of snake

Polemon bocourti, or Bocourt's snake-eater, is a species of mildly venomous rear-fanged snake in the subfamily Aparallactinae of the family Atractaspididae. The species is native to Central Africa (from Cameroon through Equatorial Guinea to Gabon and east to the Republic and Democratic Republic of the Congo).

== Etymology ==
The specific name, bocourti, is in honor of French herpetologist Marie Firmin Bocourt.

== Geographic distribution ==
Polemon bocourti is found in Cameroon, Equatorial Guinea, Gabon, western and central Democratic Republic of the Congo, and Republic of the Congo.

== Habitat ==
The preferred natural habitat of Polemon bocourti, is forest, at altitudes of 200–1,200 m (660–3,940 ft).

== Description ==
Polemon bocourti is similar to Polemon barthii, but is distinguished from it by having two postoculars, and by having a lower number of ventrals, only 199–202.

== Behavior ==
Polemon bocourti is terrestrial and fossorial.

== Reproduction ==
Polemon bocourti is oviparous.
