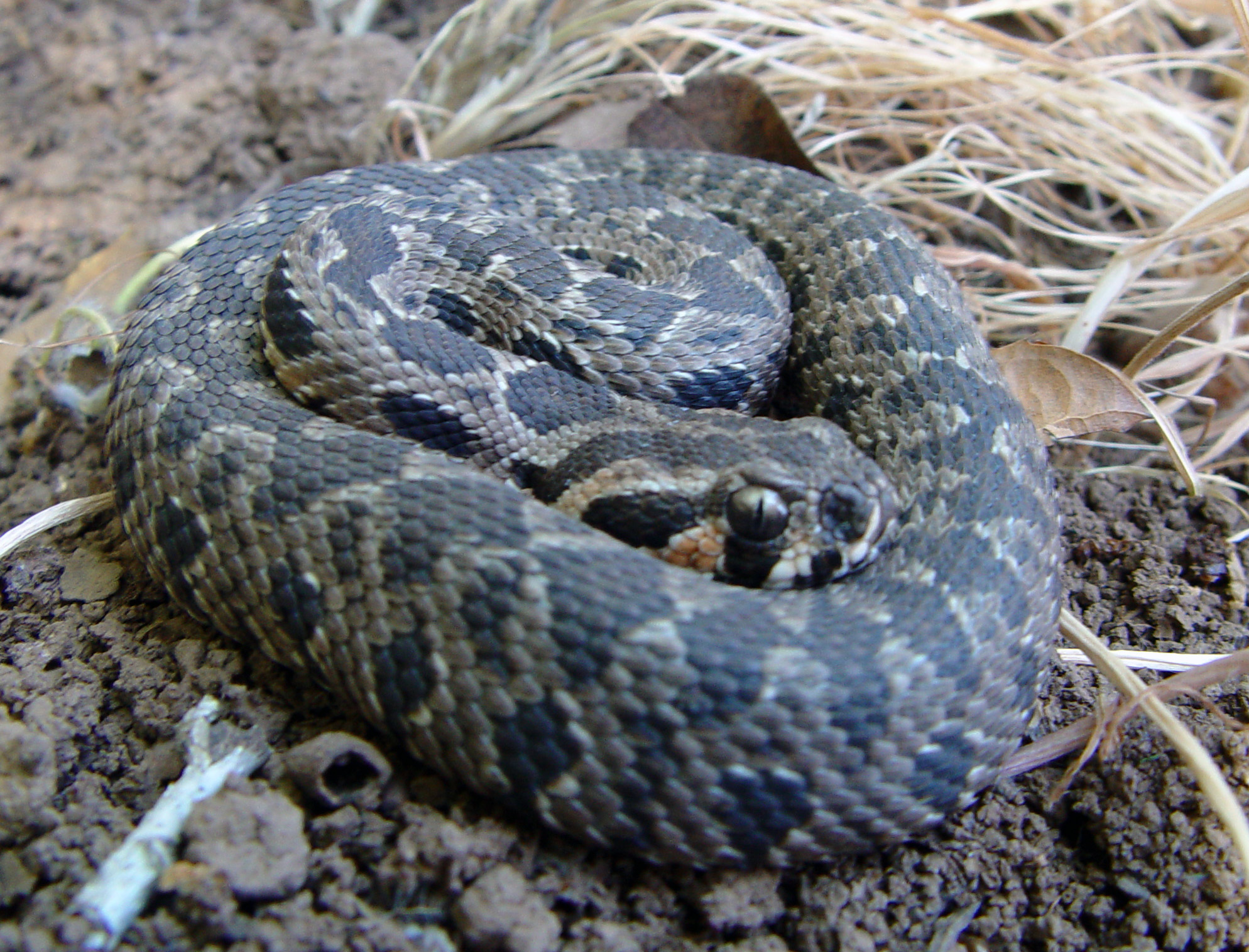

Conservation status
- Least Concern (IUCN 3.1)

Scientific classification
- Kingdom: Animalia
- Phylum: Chordata
- Class: Reptilia
- Order: Squamata
- Suborder: Serpentes
- Family: Viperidae
- Genus: Daboia
- Species: D. palaestinae

Binomial name
- Daboia palaestinae F. Werner, 1938
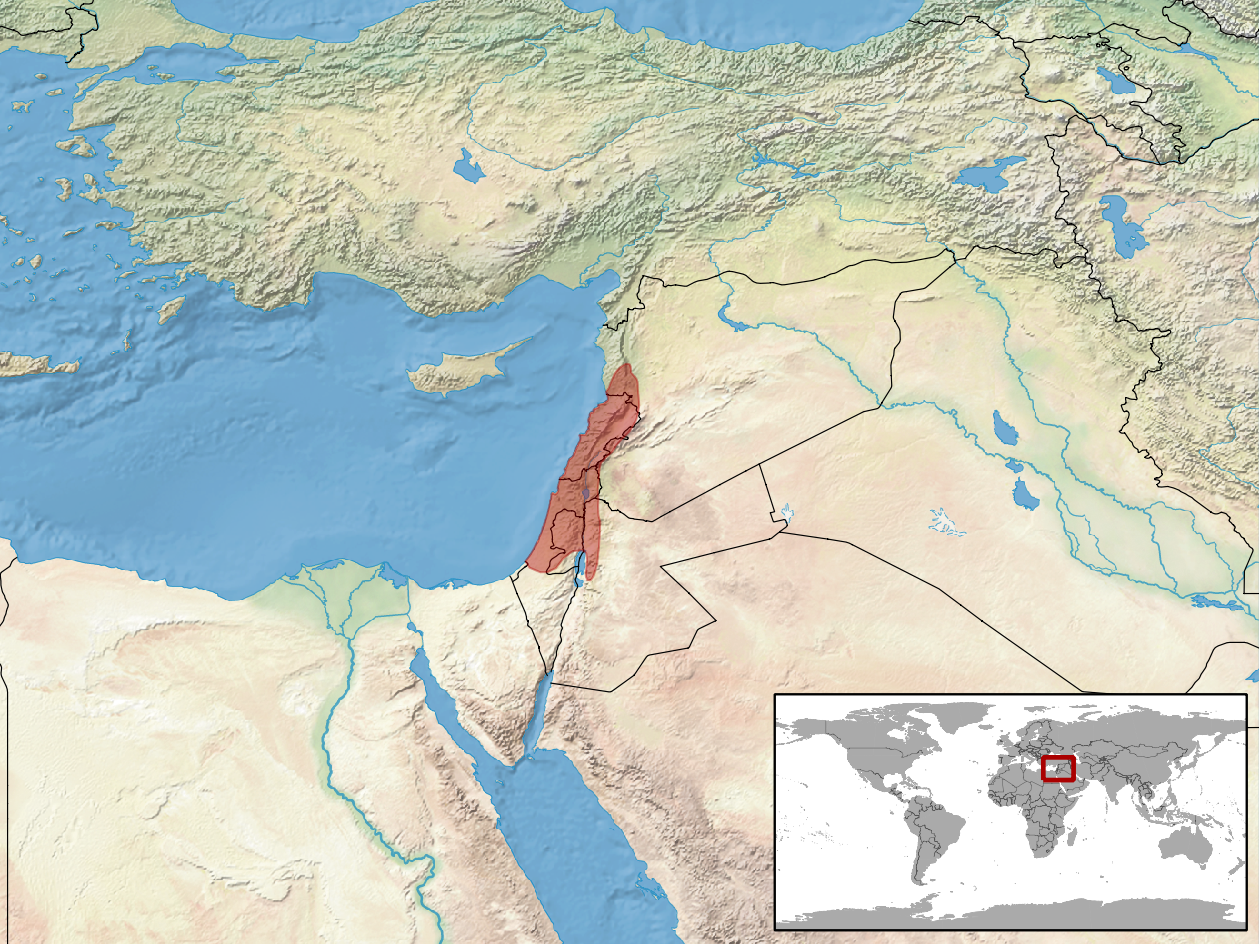

Synonyms
- Vipera palaestinae F. Werner, 1938; Vipera xanthina palaestinae Mertens, 1952; Vipera palistinae Minton, 1971; Daboia (Daboia) palaestinae Obst, 1983; Daboia palestinae Esterbauer, 1987; Vipera palgestinae Garcia, Huang & Perez, 1989; Vipera palaestinae Golay et al., 1993

= Daboia palaestinae =

Poisonous snake found in the Middle East

Daboia palaestinae, also known as the Palestine viper, is a viper species endemic to the Levant. Like all vipers, it is venomous. It is considered a leading cause of snakebite within its range. No subspecies are currently recognized.

== Description ==
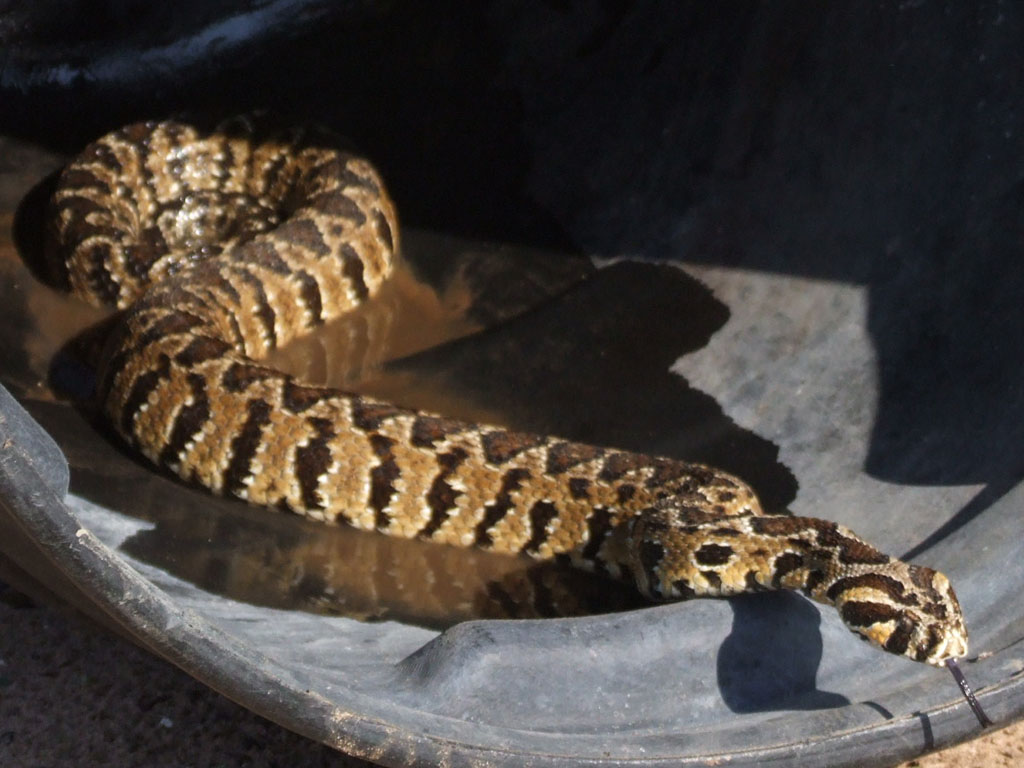
D. palaestinae

It grows to an average total length (body + tail) of 70 to 90 cm (28 to 35 in), with a maximum total length of 130 cm (51 in). The head is triangular, distinct from the neck and covered by small scales. The upper part of the body is colored by large dark rhomboid blotches sometimes forming a zig-zag pattern.

The harmless coin-marked snake, which lives in the same areas as the Palestine viper, resembles it in length, coloration and defensive behavior, to the extent that people frequently get confused between them. This is probably a case of Batesian mimicry.

== Geographic range ==
It is found in northern and central Israel, Palestine, western Syria, northwestern Jordan, and Lebanon. In 2017 a specimen was found in Turkey. Mallow et al. (2003) describe the range as relatively restricted, with the distribution being concentrated in the Mediterranean coastal plains to the inland hills of Lebanon and Israel, along with the adjoining regions of Syria and Jordan.

The type locality given is "Haifa, Israel".

== Conservation status ==
This species is assessed as Least Concern according to the IUCN Red List of Threatened Species. It was given this status due to its relatively wide distribution, the fact that it is found in a wide range of habitats, its presumed large population, and because it is unlikely to be declining fast enough to qualify for listing in a more threatened category. The population trend is unknown.

== Taxonomy ==
The classification of this species has resulted in much taxonomic controversy. Before Franz Werner (1938), this snake was included in Montivipera xanthina, and subsequently synonymized with V. lebetina by Boulenger (1896). Mertens (1952) moved it back to M. xanthina as a subspecies, and more recently a number of authorities, including Obst (1983) and Mallow et al. (2003) have included it as part of the genus Daboia. The result is that many studies related to this medically significant species have been published under different scientific names.

== Venom ==
The LD50 of this viper's venom is 0.34 mg/kg. Since the second half of the 20th century there is an antivenom for this snake's venom, which is considered safe and effective. But occasionally people still die from this snake's bite. The mortality rate of people who were bitten is 0.5% to 2%. At least 7 people were reported to die of this snake's bite in the 21st century in Israel so far.

The venom includes at least four families of pharmacologically active compounds: (i) neurotoxins; (ii) hemorrhagins; (iii) angioneurin growth factors; and (iv) different types of integrin inhibitors.

== Reproduction ==
The copulation of this snake takes place around May. Unlike most other vipers, who are viviparous, this snake is oviparous. It lays eggs around August and the eggs hatch 1.5–2 months after that. The young snakes can bite and kill their prey with a developed venom apparatus.

== In culture ==
This snake is probably mentioned in a list of venomous snakes in ancient Egypt, that appears in the Brooklyn Papyrus from the first millennium BC.

Some modern scholars and commentators have identified the צפע (pronounced Tsefa/Zefa) snake mentioned in the Hebrew Bible as this snake species. The name given to this snake in modern Hebrew is צפע מצוי (common Tsefa).

The code phrase “Nahash Tsefa” (Viper Snake) was broadcast on the radio and TV to instruct Israeli citizens to put on their gas masks during missile attacks from Iraq against Israel, in the first Gulf War in 1991.

In the Israeli Air Force the Bell AH-1 Cobra helicopter was named Tzefa. The IDF's paratroopers battalion #202 is called Tzefa Battalion.

In 2018, the Palestine viper was selected as the national snake of Israel, following a public campaign initiated by Avi Zobel and the "Reptiles of Israel" initiative, in collaboration with local environmental organizations.
