= Rostral bone =

Skull of the bowfin, showing location of rostral bone.

The term rostral bone, often shortened to simply rostral, refers to a number of bones present in the snout region of some vertebrates. The term "rostral" means referring to the rostrum, or snout. The term is used to refer to several non-homologous bones present in various vertebrate groups.

== Evolution ==
=== "True" rostral bones ===
The rostral bones are dermal bones present in the front part of the skull of many fishes, where they sit between the nasals, anterior to the parietals, and posterior to the premaxillae. They are divided into the medial rostrals, intermediate rostrals, and lateral rostrals. The rostral bones are believed to be derived from the premedian plate and rostral plate of placoderms.

Rostral bones are ancestrally present among actinopterygians. The medial rostrals, which can be paired or single, are absent in most teleosts, but are present in elopomorphs where they are anteriorly fused to the internasal. Intermediate rostrals are similarly absent in many teleosts. The lateral rostral is more commonly present, and has historically been confused with the ethmoid region.

The intermediate rostrals are absent in sarcopterygians. In the clade Choanata (including tetrapods), the median rostral becomes fused to the premaxilla. The lateral rostral is believed to be homologous with the septomaxilla and is therefore retained in many tetrapods.

Among porolepiformes, a bone sometimes referred to as the nariodal bone occurs between the anterior and posterior nostrils. This bone is considered to represent the lateral rostral.

=== Other bones called the rostral ===
Skull of Aquilops, a ceratopsian, showing the rostral at the very tip of the snout.

An unpaired median rostral is present in the frog Triprion. In this taxon it is a dermal bone and a neomorph anterior to the premaxilla. It is also known as the prenasal bone. This element ossifies from paired ossification centres; it has been suggested that the element is homologous to the internasal in closely related species. An alternate hypothesis suggests that the element is an atavistic occurrence of the postrostral bone.

A similar neomorphic dermal bone is present at the tip of the snout in ceratopsian dinosaurs. In this clade, the bone opposes the predentary of the mandible, and would have been covered in a keratinous sheath forming a beak in life.

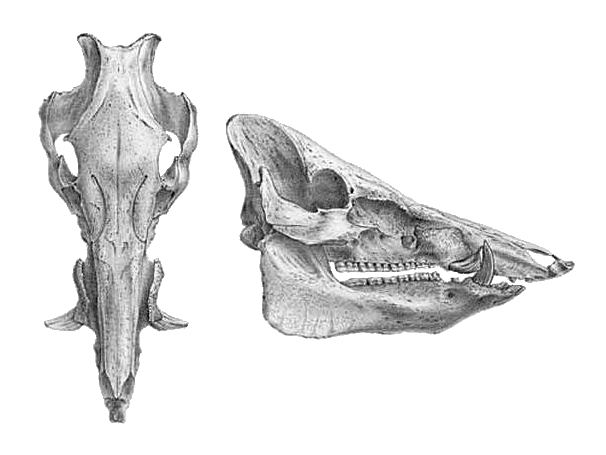
Skull of a Celebes Warty Pig showing rostral bone at tip of snout.

Among pigs, a midline bone referred to as the rostral bone, also called the prenasal bone, is present in the snout, where it spans the external nares from the nasal to the premaxilla at the anterior end of the cartilaginous nasal septum. It forms the base of the disc-like mobile snout, and is thought to aid in rooting for food. In peccaries and piglets, the element is cartilaginous, making it a rare example of a so-called "rostral" bone which is endochondral, not dermal. In elderly pigs the nasal septum may ossify, causing the rostral to become immobile; it is not known to fuse with the premaxilla. A similar ossification has also been found in the water buffalo, where it forms a thin sword-like element. A bony element known as the os proboscidis is present in the Hispaniolan solenodon; the element is mobile and supports the elongate snout, and has been likened to the prenasal.
