= Canthal scales =

Type of snake scales

In snakes, the canthals are the scales along the upper surface of the canthus rostralis. They are located behind the level of the prenasal/postnasal suture and before the supraocular. They are also described as being located along the edge of the crown between the internasals and the supraoculars. If these are large scales that contact each other along the midline, they are more properly referred to as prefrontals.

Intercanthal scales are located between the canthal scales.
