= Polemon christyi =

Conservation status
- Least Concern (IUCN 3.1)

Scientific classification
- Kingdom: Animalia
- Phylum: Chordata
- Class: Reptilia
- Order: Squamata
- Suborder: Serpentes
- Family: Atractaspididae
- Genus: Polemon
- Species: P. christyi

Binomial name
- Polemon christyi (Boulenger, 1903)

Synonyms
- Miodon christyi Boulenger, 1903; Miodon unicolor K.P. Schmidt, 1923; Melanocalamus leopoldi de Witte, 1941; Miodon collaris christyi — Loveridge, 1957; Polemon christyi — Broadley & Howell, 1991

Species of snake

Polemon christyi, also known commonly as Christy's snake-eater and the eastern snake-eater, is a species of mildly venomous rear-fanged snake in the subfamily Aparallactinae of the family Atractaspididae. The species is native to Central Africa and East Africa.

== Etymology ==
The specific name, christyi, is in honor of English physician Cuthbert Christy, who presented the type specimen to the British Museum (Natural History). The synonym, "leopoldi ", is in honor of Leopold III, King of the Belgians.

== Geographic range ==
Distribution of Polemon christyi include Uganda, the Democratic Republic of the Congo, South Sudan, and western Kenya. The status of observations from Rwanda and Malawi is uncertain, whereas observations from Tanzania, Zambia, and possibly Burundi likely refer to Polemon ater described in 2019.

== Habitat ==
The preferred natural habitats of P. christyi are forest and savanna, at altitudes of 600–1,700 m (2,000–5,600 ft).

== Description ==
The dorsum of the body of P. christyi is black. The ventral surface of the head is also black. The ventrals and subcaudals are white, broadly margined with black.

The type specimen, a female, is 43 cm (16 7/8 in) in total length, which includes a tail 28 mm (1 1/8 in) long.

The dorsal scales are smooth, without apical pits, and are arranged in 15 rows at midbody. The ventrals number 209. The anal plate is divided. The subcaudals number 20, also divided.

The diameter of the eye is three fifths its distance from the mouth. The rostral is higher than wide, barely visible from above. The internasals are slightly shorter than the prefrontals. The frontal is slightly longer than broad, much broader than the supraoculars, as long as its distance from the rostral, much shorter than the parietals. The nasal is entire, in contact with the preocular. There are two postoculars. The temporals are 1+1. There are seven upper labials, the third and fourth entering the eye. There are four lower labials in contact with the anterior chin shield, the first lower labial forming a suture with its fellow behind the mental. There are two pairs of chin shields, the anterior pair larger than the posterior pair.

== Diet ==
P. christyi preys upon snakes, including those of its own species.

== Reproduction ==
P. christyi is oviparous.
