= Desert vipers =

Desert vipers may refer to:

- Moorish vipers, Daboia mauritanica
- Desert Vipers, a T20 cricket team
