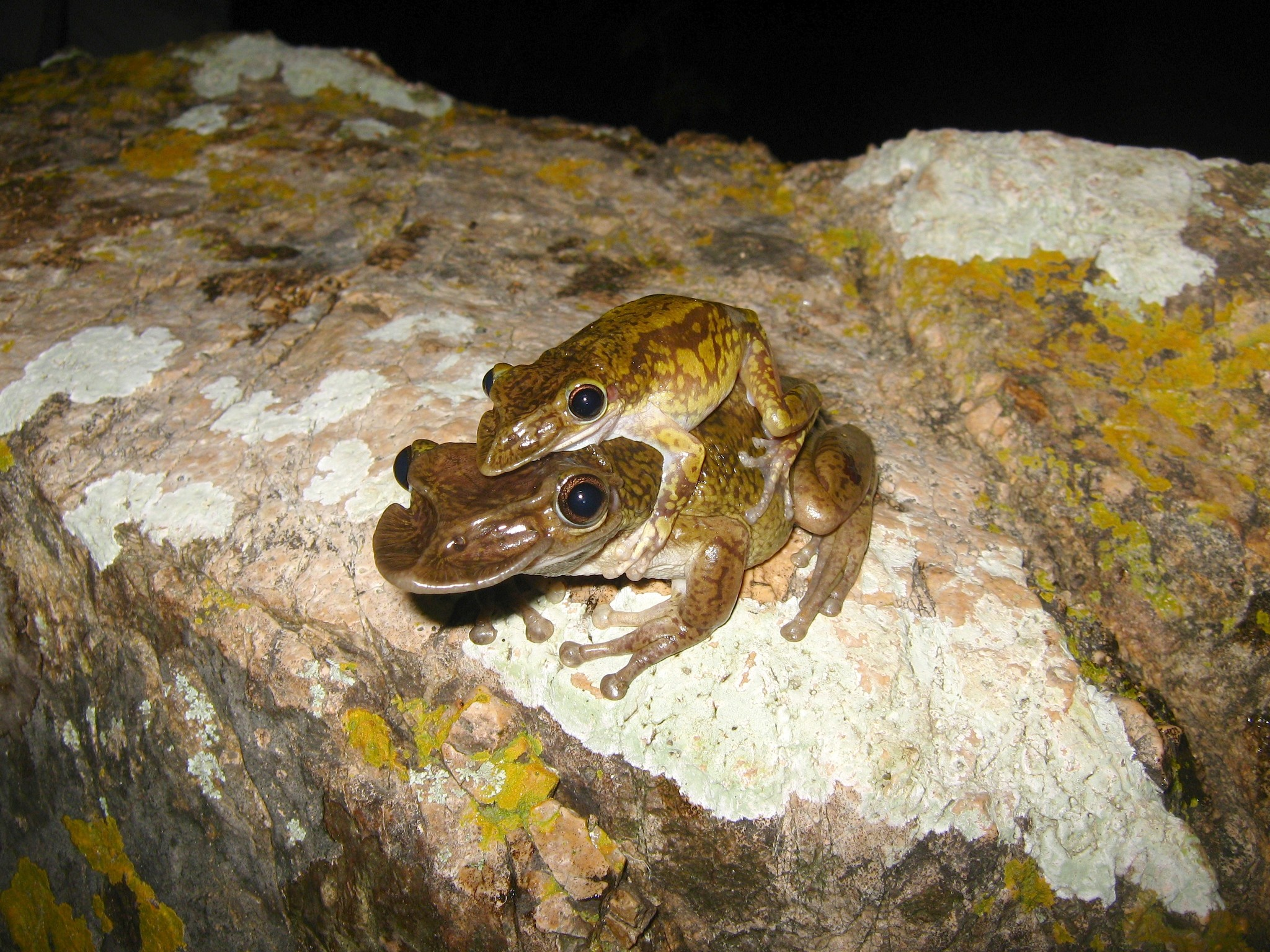
- A pair in amplexus

Conservation status
- Least Concern (IUCN 3.1)

Scientific classification
- Kingdom: Animalia
- Phylum: Chordata
- Class: Amphibia
- Order: Anura
- Family: Hylidae
- Genus: Triprion
- Species: T. spatulatus

Binomial name
- Triprion spatulatus Günther, 1882

Synonyms
- Diaglena spatulata — Cope, 1887; Diaglena reticulata Taylor, 1942; Hyla spatulata — Wiens et al., 2005, by implication

= Triprion spatulatus =

Species of frog

Triprion spatulatus is a species of frog in the family Hylidae. It is endemic to the Pacific lowlands of western Mexico between the Sinaloa and Oaxaca states. It is known by several common names: shovel-headed treefrog, Mexican shovel-headed treefrog, shovel-nosed tree frog, and shovelhead treefrog.

== Taxonomy and systematics ==
Two subspecies that primarily differ in coloration are sometimes distinguished:

- Triprion spatulatus spatulatus Günther, 1882
- Triprion spatulatus reticulatus (Taylor, 1942)

Duellman (1970) allocated specimens from Sinaloa to the nominotypical subspecies and those further south and east to T. s. reticulatus. However, more recent research suggests that populations east of the Isthmus of Tehuantepec represent a distinct but yet undescribed species.

== Description ==
Triprion spatulatus are large frogs, with males reaching 87 mm (3.4 in) and females 101 mm (4.0 in) in snout–vent length. The head has broad labial flanges, giving it a spoon-like shape, as attested in its specific (from Latin spatulus, "spoon") and vernacular names. The eyes are protuberant, moderately large, and anterolaterally oriented. The tympanum is visible but partially obscured by labial and/or postorbital ridges. The fingers bear large discs and some rudimentary webbing. The toes are about two-thirds webbed. The general coloration in the nominotypical subspecies is pale green or yellowish tan with green to yellow flecks. The head is somewhat darker than the back. The flanks have a yellowish cast. The venter is white apart from grayish brown flecks in the voval sac of breedings males. T. s. reticulatus has pale yellowish tan or olive-green coloration with dark brown or black reticulations and spots.

== Habitat and conservation ==
Triprion spatulatus occurs in lowland xeric and thorn-scrub forest and tropical deciduous forest at elevations up to 350 m (1,150 ft) asl. Breeding takes place in the temporary streams and ponds formed by rainfall and is therefore constrained to the rainy season. It is a common species that is not facing significant threats. Fire and changes in rainfall patterns are potential threats. Its range includes the Chamela-Cuixmala Biosphere Reserve.
