= Polemon griseiceps =

Scientific classification
- Domain: Eukaryota
- Kingdom: Animalia
- Phylum: Chordata
- Class: Reptilia
- Order: Squamata
- Suborder: Serpentes
- Family: Atractaspididae
- Genus: Polemon
- Species: P. griseiceps

Binomial name
- Polemon griseiceps (Laurent, 1947)

Synonyms
- Miodon griseiceps Laurent, 1947; Polemon griseiceps — LeBreton, 1999

Species of snake

Polemon griseiceps, or the Cameroon snake-eater, is a species of rear-fanged mildly venomous snake in the subfamily Aparallactinae. The species is endemic to Middle Africa.

== Geographic range ==
Polemon griseiceps is found in Cameroon, the Central African Republic, and the Republic of the Congo.
