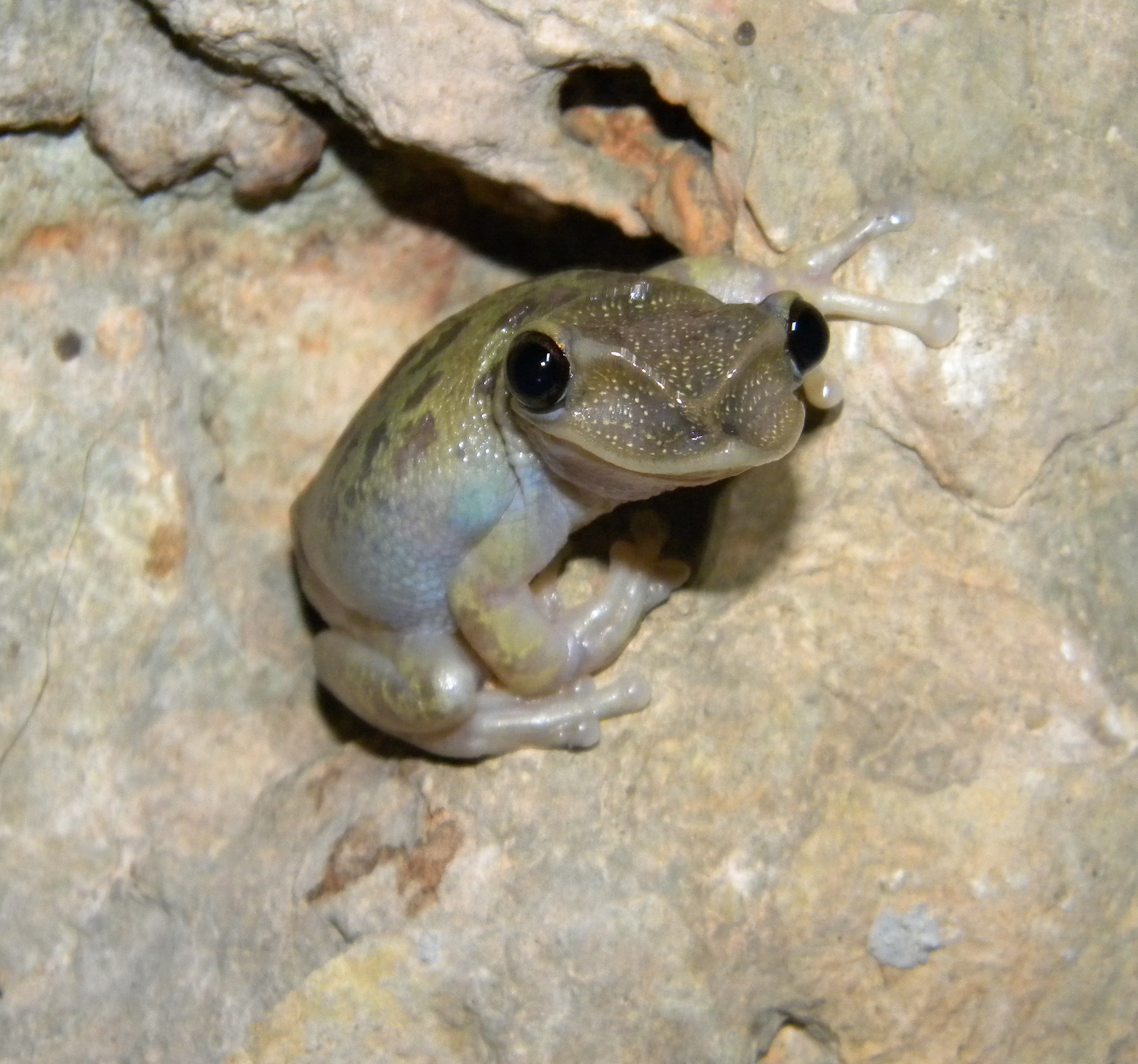

Conservation status
- Least Concern (IUCN 3.1)

Scientific classification
- Kingdom: Animalia
- Phylum: Chordata
- Class: Amphibia
- Order: Anura
- Family: Hylidae
- Genus: Triprion
- Species: T. petasatus

Binomial name
- Triprion petasatus Cope, 1865

= Triprion petasatus =

Species of frog

Triprion petasatus, Yucatán shovel-headed tree frog, Yucatán casque-headed tree frog, or Yucatán casquehead tree frog is a species of frog in the family Hylidae found in Belize, Guatemala, Honduras, and Mexico. Its natural habitats are subtropical or tropical dry forests, moist savanna, freshwater marshes, intermittent freshwater marshes, rural gardens, heavily degraded former forests, aquaculture ponds, and canals and ditches.

== Appearance ==
The adult male frog measures 48.1 to 60.8 mm in snout-vent length and the adult female frog 65.0 to 75.2 mm. This frog has thick, strong front legs and relatively short hind legs. There are very large disks on the front toes. Its large, bony head, resembles a hat or helmet, which is the inspiration for its English and Latin names. The adult male frog is olive green in color, and the adult female frog is light brown or green-brown. There are dark brown or black marks on the back and legs. Some frogs have silver marks on their backs and head. The frogs have some yellow coloration on their flanks or red-brown on their hind legs. The belly is white and tan.

== Behavior ==
This frog lays eggs during the rainy season. The male frog climbs to a branch about 2.5 meters above the ground and sings for the females. The female lays eggs in temporary bodies of water, such as solution pits. The eggs are deposited about 40 cm deep. The frogs mate in trees and other elevated places. When the weather is dry or the sun is hot, this frog seeks out holes in a tree. It puts its body inside and its head against the hole to block the entrance.

== Threats and relationship to humans ==
This frog is not endangered but it is sensitive to habitat loss. Human beings cut down the forests for lumber, agriculture, and grazing. This frog is also captured and bred for the pet trade.
