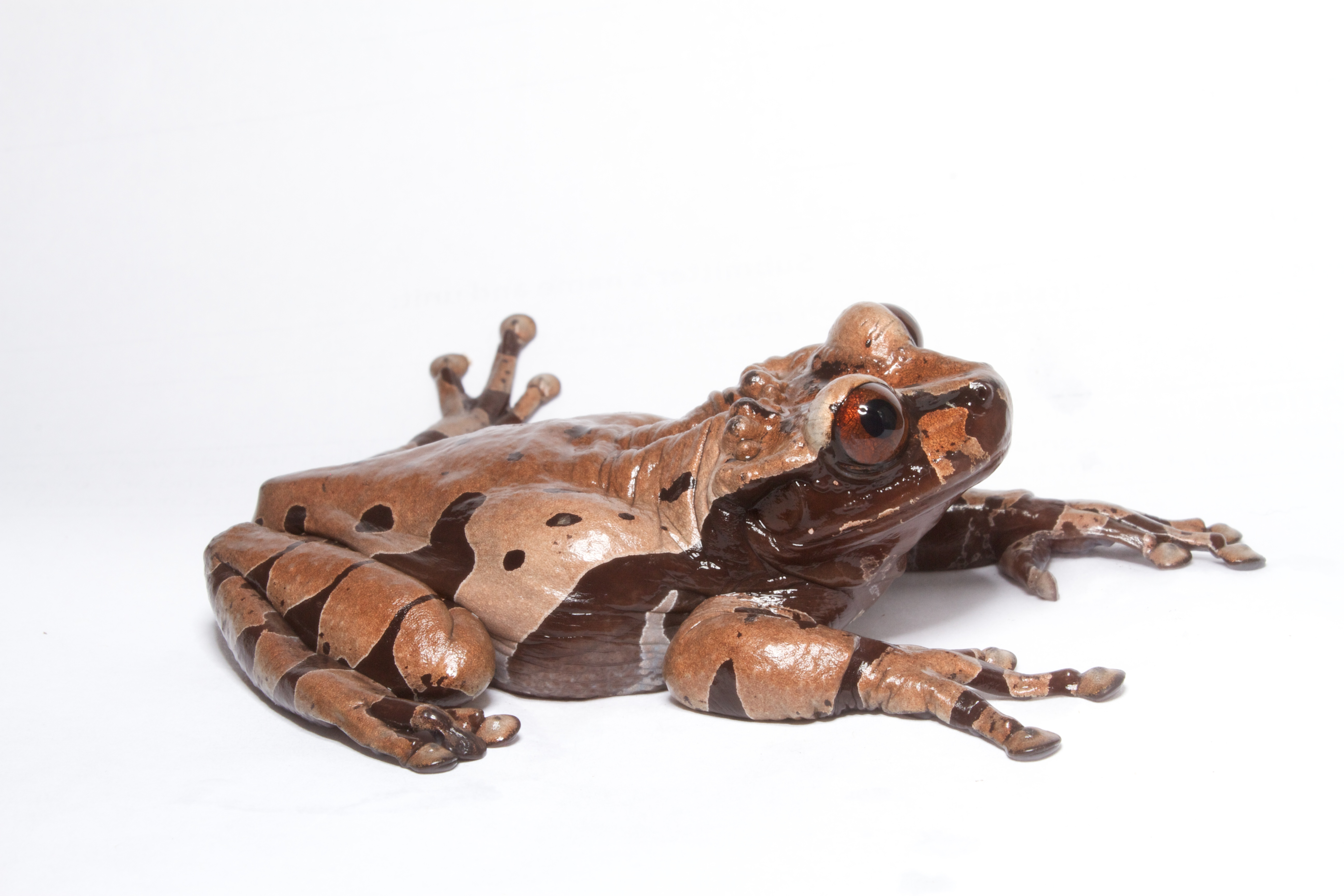

Conservation status
- Near Threatened (IUCN 3.1)

Scientific classification
- Kingdom: Animalia
- Phylum: Chordata
- Class: Amphibia
- Order: Anura
- Family: Hylidae
- Genus: Triprion
- Species: T. spinosus

Binomial name
- Triprion spinosus (Steindachner, 1864)

Synonyms
- Hyla spinosa Steindachner, 1864; Gastrotheca coronata Stejneger, 1911; Nototrema coronatum — Nieden, 1923; Anotheca coronata — Smith, 1939; Anotheca spinosa — Duellman, 1968

= Triprion spinosus =

Species of amphibian

Triprion spinosus, also known as the spiny-headed tree frog, spiny-headed treefrog, spinyhead treefrog, coronated treefrog, and crowned hyla, is a species of frog in the family Hylidae. It has a spotty distribution in Panama, Costa Rica, Honduras, and southern Mexico. Previously in its own monotypic genus Anotheca Smith, 1939, it was transferred to the genus Triprion in 2018.

== Description ==
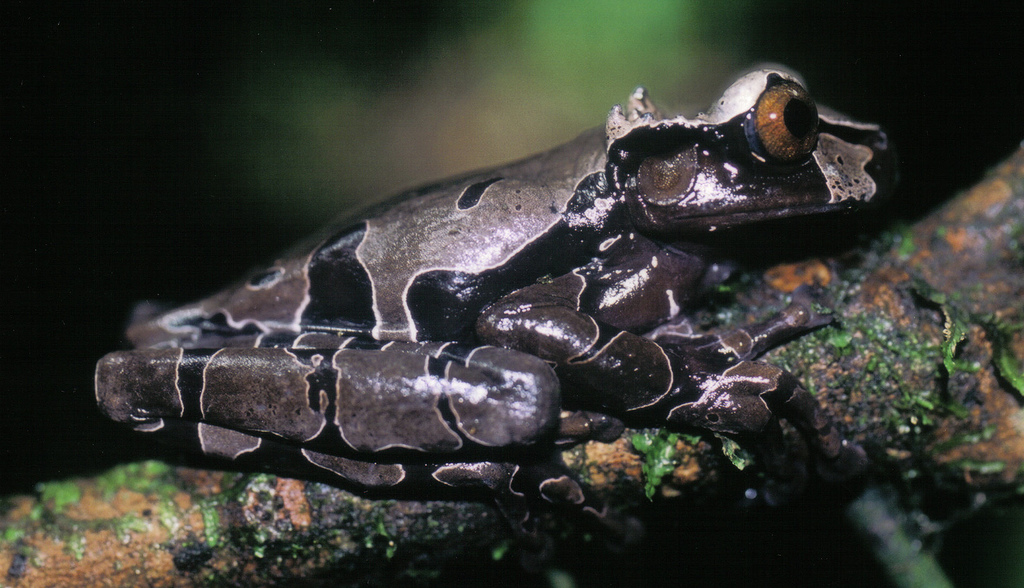
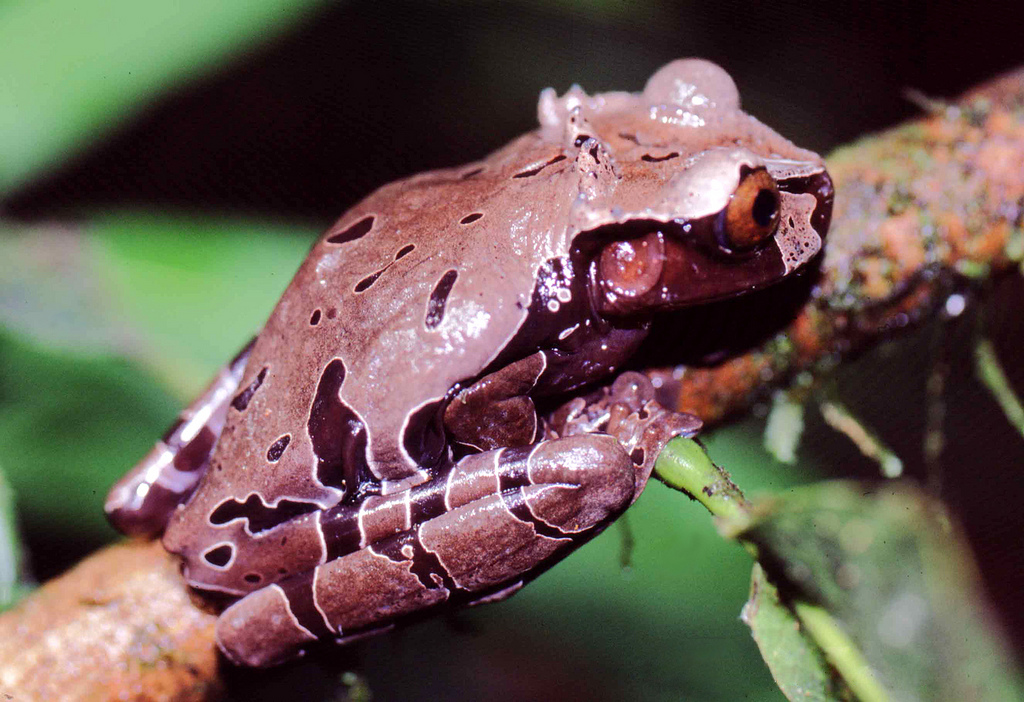
The upperparts of this species range from grayish to brownish

This species is a relative large frog with a snout–to–vent length of 5.8 to 8 cm (2.3–3.1 in). It has numerous sharp, pointed projections on the head and dorsal surface, hence the common name. The skin on the head is fused to the skull and the tympanum is very large. The legs are long and slender and the digits have adhesive discs at the tips. The dorsal surface is pale brown or gray, with dark markings, and the flanks are dark brown or black, the colors being separated by a narrow white band.

== Ecology ==
This species is active at night when the male's call "boop...boop...boop" is more likely to be heard than the frog is to be seen. The male calls from beside a temporary water body, a water-filled hollow in a tree or the water caught in the rosette of a bromeliad, and this is where the female lays. The developing tadpoles will be safe from large predators such as fish, but there is a dearth of suitable food in these minute pools. The female frog solves this problem by periodically visiting each of the locations where she has laid, and laying unfertilised eggs for the young to feed on. The tadpoles stimulate her to do this by nibbling at her belly. Up to sixteen tadpoles have been found in a single transient pool.

== Habitat and conservation ==
Triprion spinosus occurs in lowland rainforests and montane humid forests at elevations of 95–2,000 m (310–6,560 ft) above sea level. However, in at least Costa Rica and Panama, it can be common in young secondary growth forest and coffee plantations far from forest. Breeding takes place in tree holes. It is threatened by severe disturbance, clearance and transformation of its original habitat to open areas. It is present in a number of protected areas. A captive "insurance population" is bred and maintained by the El Valle Amphibian Conservation Center, Panama, Atlanta Botanical Garden, United States, and a few AZA zoos.
