= Predentary =

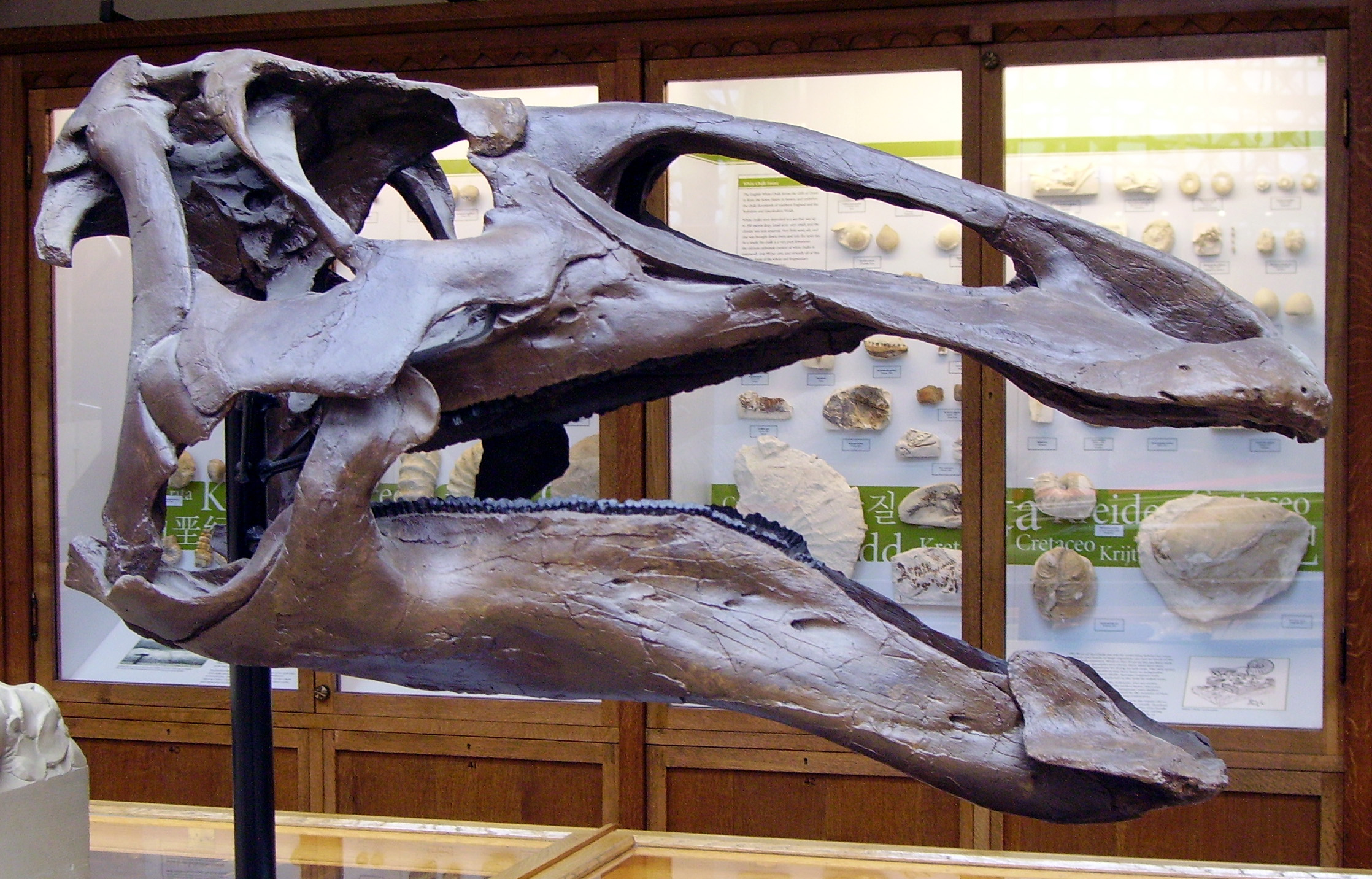
Edmontosaurus skull with a visible predentary

A predentary is an ossification situated on the front of the lower jaw, which extended the dentary (the main lower jaw bone). A predentary bone has evolved independently in two groups of teleost fish, Istiophoridae and Saurodontidae, and two dinosaur groups, ornithischians and ornithuromorph birds.

A predentary is found in all but perhaps the earliest ornithischian dinosaurs. Its occurrence led Othniel Marsh to propose naming the group Predentata, though this is now considered a synonym of Ornithischia. The predentary coincided with the premaxilla in the upper jaw. Together, they formed a beak-like apparatus used to clip off plant material. In ceratopsian dinosaurs, it opposes the rostral bone. The predentary would have allowed the dentaries to move slightly independently of each other, aiding chewing. The toothless, beaked tip of the dentary in silesaurids may have been a predecessor of the ornithischian predentary.

The avian predentary arose in the clade Ornithuromorpha, and is absent from earlier bird lineages such as enantiornitheans and Archaeopteryx. It has been interpreted as a sesamoid bone. Members of Neornithes, the group containing all modern birds, lack a predentary, unlike other ornithuromorphs, possibly because the fusion of the mandibular symphysis and loss of teeth rendered the predentary unnecessary. Due to the independent origins of the predentary in ornithischians and birds, the avian predentary has alternatively been called the intersymphyseal ossificiation, although this term is not entirely appropriate because it is not strictly intersymphyseal in position.

An ossified predentary has arisen in two lineages of fish, the extinct Saurodontidae and the extant Istiophoridae (marlin), and a cartilaginous pre-mandibular element occurs in several other groups. The istiophorid predentary differs from other predentaries in bearing denticles.
