= Septomaxilla =

Skull bone found in tetrapods

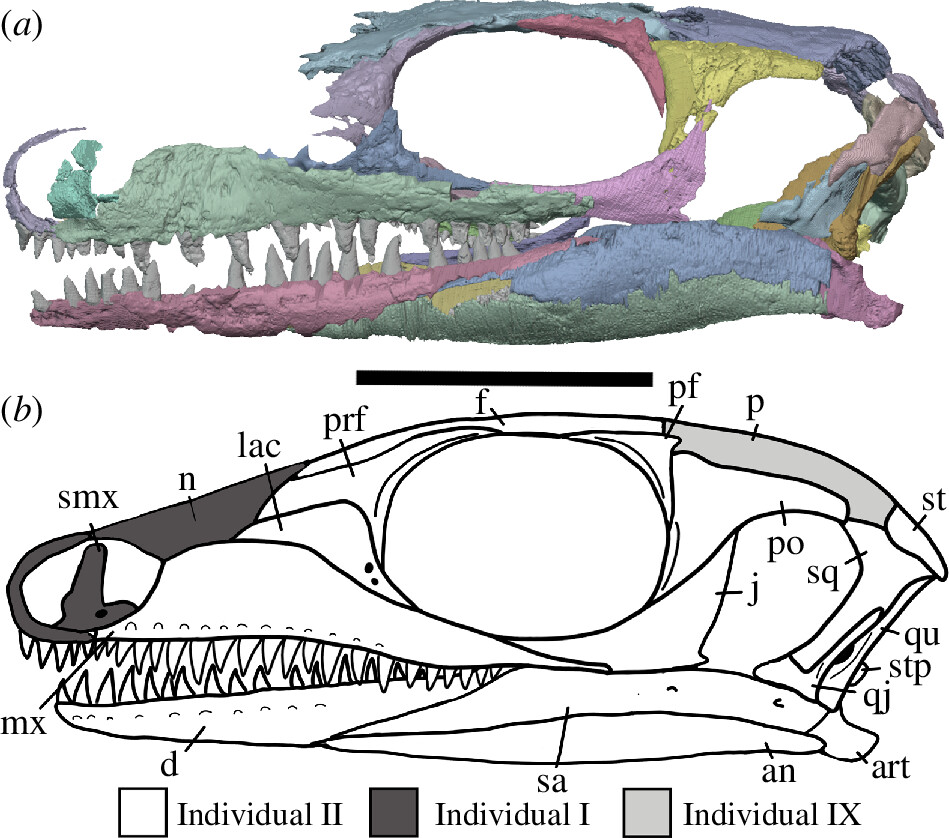
Skull of the early reptile Milleropsis, showing the location of the septomaxilla (smx)

Skull of stem-mammal Morganucodon, showing septomaxilla in grey

The septomaxilla is a skull bone found in tetrapods. A generally small bone, it is associated with the nasal opening of the skull, either within or adjacent to it, and with the nasolacrimal duct.

== Evolution ==
The homology of the septomaxilla of tetrapods to bones present in fish is disputed; it has been variously suggested to be homologous to the anterior tectal or lateral rostral.

The septomaxilla is retained by some living amphibians (lissamphibians) including frogs, salamanders and caecilians, as well as lepidosaurian reptiles including snakes, some lizards and the tuatara. It has been lost in turtles.

The septomaxilla is rarely found in archosauromorphs, but has been identified in Tanystropheus, Trilophosaurus, the rhynchosaurs Hyperodapedon and Teyumbaita, Prolacerta, and the basal archosauriform Proterosuchus. There is no evidence for a septomaxilla in archosauriforms (including living crocodilians and birds) other than Proterosuchus. An element found in phytosaurs sometimes called the "septomaxilla" is not homologous to the septomaxilla of other tetrapods.

It is particularly well developed within many non-mammalian synapsids, where it forms a floor to the nasal opening. It is present as a distinct bone above the premaxilla in monotreme mammals. In most therian mammals, it is generally suggested to have been lost (though it has been proposed to be present in xenarthrans), but it has recently been argued by some authors that in fact the "premaxilla" of therian mammals is actually developmentally homologous to the septomaxilla, which they suggest had become enlarged and tooth-bearing, with the true premaxilla being entirely lost. This hypothesis has not been supported by further developmental evidence.
