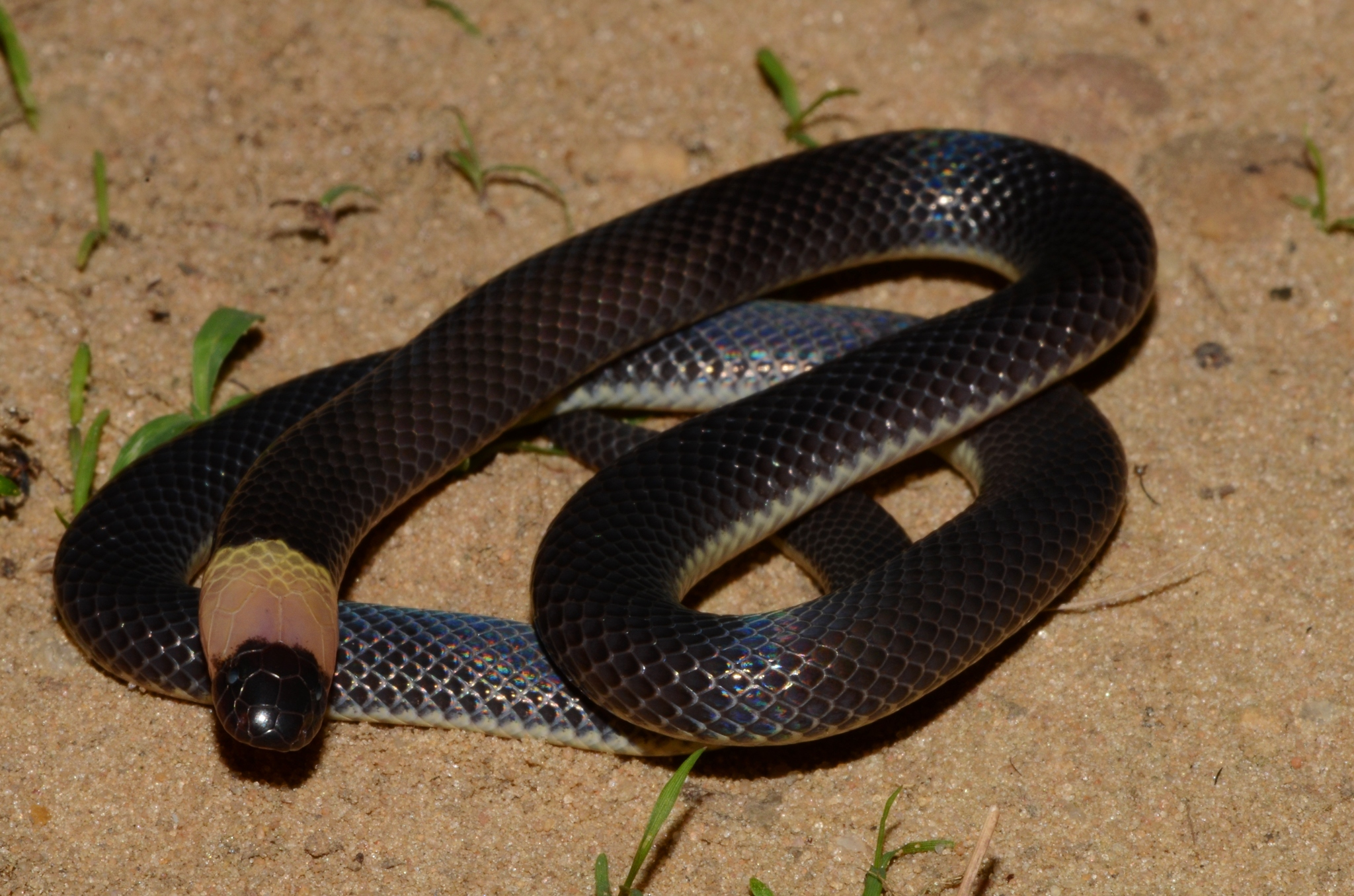
- Polemon bocourti

Scientific classification
- Kingdom: Animalia
- Phylum: Chordata
- Class: Reptilia
- Order: Squamata
- Suborder: Serpentes
- Family: Atractaspididae
- Subfamily: Aparallactinae
- Genus: Polemon; Jan, 1858

Synonyms
- Miodon A.H.A. Duméril, 1859

= Polemon (snake) =

Genus of snakes

Polemon is a genus of rear-fanged mildly venomous snakes in the family Atractaspididae. The genus is endemic to Africa. Fifteen species are recognized as being valid.

Miodon is a synonym. The mollusc genus of family Carditidae invalidly described by Carpenter in 1863 has been renamed Miodontiscus.

== Common name ==
The common name of this genus is snake-eaters, for their habit of feeding mainly on smaller snakes.

== Description ==
In the genus Polemon the maxillary is very short, with three small teeth, followed, after an interspace, by a very large, grooved fang situated anterior to the eye. The third and fourth mandibular teeth are large and fang-like. The head is small, and not distinct from neck. The eyes are minute, with round pupils. The nostrils are in a divided nasal which does not touch the rostral, the internasal forms a suture with the first upper labial. No loreal is present. The parietal is narrowly in contact with an upper labial.

The body is cylindrical, with a very short tail. Dorsal scales are smooth, without apical pits, and are arranged in 15 rows. The ventrals are rounded; the subcaudals are single (entire), or double (divided).

== Species ==
Genus Polemon -- 13 species
Species	Taxon author	Subspecies*	Common name	Geographic range
P. acanthias	(J.T. Reinhardt, 1860)	————	Reinhardt's snake-eater	Guinea, Liberia, Ivory Coast, Ghana, Togo, Sierra Leone.
P. ater	Portillo, Branch, Tilbury, Nagy, Hughes, Kusamba, Muninga, Aristote, Behangana & Greenbaum, 2019	————	black snake-eater	Central Africa, East Africa.
P. barthii	Jan, 1858	————	Guinea snake-eater	Guinea, Ivory Coast, Cameroon.
P. bocourti	Mocquard, 1897	————	Bocourt's snake-eater	Cameroon, Río Muni, Gabon, Democratic Republic of the Congo (Zaire).
P. christyi	(Boulenger, 1903)	————	eastern snake-eater	Dem. Rep. Congo, Malawi, Uganda, Tanzania, Zambia.
P. collaris	(W. Peters, 1881)	brevior longior	collared snake-eater	Angola, Cameroon, Democratic Republic of the Congo, Gabon, Equatorial Guinea, Rwanda, Burundi, Uganda, Nigeria, Central African Republic.
P. fulvicollis	(Mocquard, 1887)	gracilis graueri laurenti	African snake-eater	Gabon, Democratic Republic of the Congo (Zaire), Congo, Uganda.
P. gabonensis	(A.H.A. Duméril, 1856)	schmidti	Gaboon snake-eater	Democratic Republic of the Congo (Zaire), Cameroon, Nigeria, Benin, Togo, Central African Republic.
P. gracilis	(Boulenger, 1911)	————	graceful snake-eater	South Cameroon.
P. graueri	(Sternfeld, 1908)	————	Grauer's snake-eater	Uganda, eastern Zaire.
P. griseiceps	(Laurent, 1947)	————	Cameroon snake-eater	Cameroon, Central African Republic, Congo.
P. leopoldi	(de Witte, 1941)	————		Rwanda.
P. neuwiedi	(Jan, 1858)	————	Ivory Coast snake-eater	Ivory Coast, Ghana, Togo, Benin, Burkina Faso, Nigeria.
P. notatus	(W. Peters, 1882)	aemulans		Cameroon, Central African Republic, Democratic Republic of the Congo, Gabon.
P. robustus	(de Witte & Laurent, 1943)	————	Zaire snake-eater	Democratic Republic of the Congo (Zaire), Central African Republic.

* Not including the nominate subspecies.

== See also ==
- Snakebite
