= Intercanthal scales =

Type of snake scale

In snakes, intercanthals are scales on top of the snout located between the canthal scales.
