= Polemon robustus =

Scientific classification
- Kingdom: Animalia
- Phylum: Chordata
- Class: Reptilia
- Order: Squamata
- Suborder: Serpentes
- Family: Atractaspididae
- Genus: Polemon
- Species: P. robustus

Binomial name
- Polemon robustus (de Witte & Laurent, 1943)

Synonyms
- Miodon robustus de Witte & Laurent, 1943; Polemon robustus — Welch, 1994

Species of snake

Polemon robustus, or the Zaire snake-eater, is a species of rear-fanged mildly venomous snake in the family Atractaspididae. The species is endemic to Africa.

== Geographic range ==
Polemon robustus is found in the Central African Republic and the Democratic Republic of the Congo.
