= Polemon graueri =

Conservation status
- Least Concern (IUCN 3.1)

Scientific classification
- Kingdom: Animalia
- Phylum: Chordata
- Class: Reptilia
- Order: Squamata
- Suborder: Serpentes
- Family: Atractaspididae
- Genus: Polemon
- Species: P. graueri

Binomial name
- Polemon graueri (Sternfeld, 1908)

Species of snake

Polemon graueri, the Grauer's snake-eater, is a species of snake in the genus Polemon. The species is endemic to Uganda. The species was described in 1908 by Sternfeld. The species is listed as Least Concern on the IUCN Red List and populations are stable. The species occurs in forests and in elevations of 1,200 m (3,900 ft).
