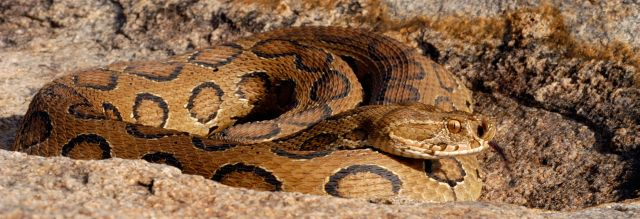

Scientific classification
- Kingdom: Animalia
- Phylum: Chordata
- Class: Reptilia
- Order: Squamata
- Suborder: Serpentes
- Family: Viperidae
- Subfamily: Viperinae
- Genus: Daboia; Gray, 1842

Type species
- Daboia russelii Shaw & Nodder, 1797

Synonyms
- Daboia Gray, 1842; Chersophis Fitzinger, 1843; Daboya Hattori, 1913

= Daboia =

Genus of snakes

Daboia is a genus of vipers.

== Species ==
The following four species are recognized as being valid:

- Daboia mauritanica (Duméril & Bibron, 1848) – Moorish viper
- Daboia palaestinae (F. Werner, 1938) – Palestine viper
- Daboia russelii (Shaw & Nodder, 1797) – Russell's viper
- Daboia siamensis (M.A. Smith, 1917) – eastern Russell's viper

In the future, more species may be added to Daboia. Obst (1983) reviewed the genus and suggested that it be extended to include Macrovipera lebetina, Daboia palaestinae, and M. xanthina. Groombridge (1980, 1986) united V. palaestinae and Daboia as a clade based on a number of shared apomorphies, including snout shape and head color pattern. Lenk et al. (2001) found support for this idea based on molecular evidence, suggesting that Daboia not only include V. palaestinae, but also D. mauritanica and M. deserti.
