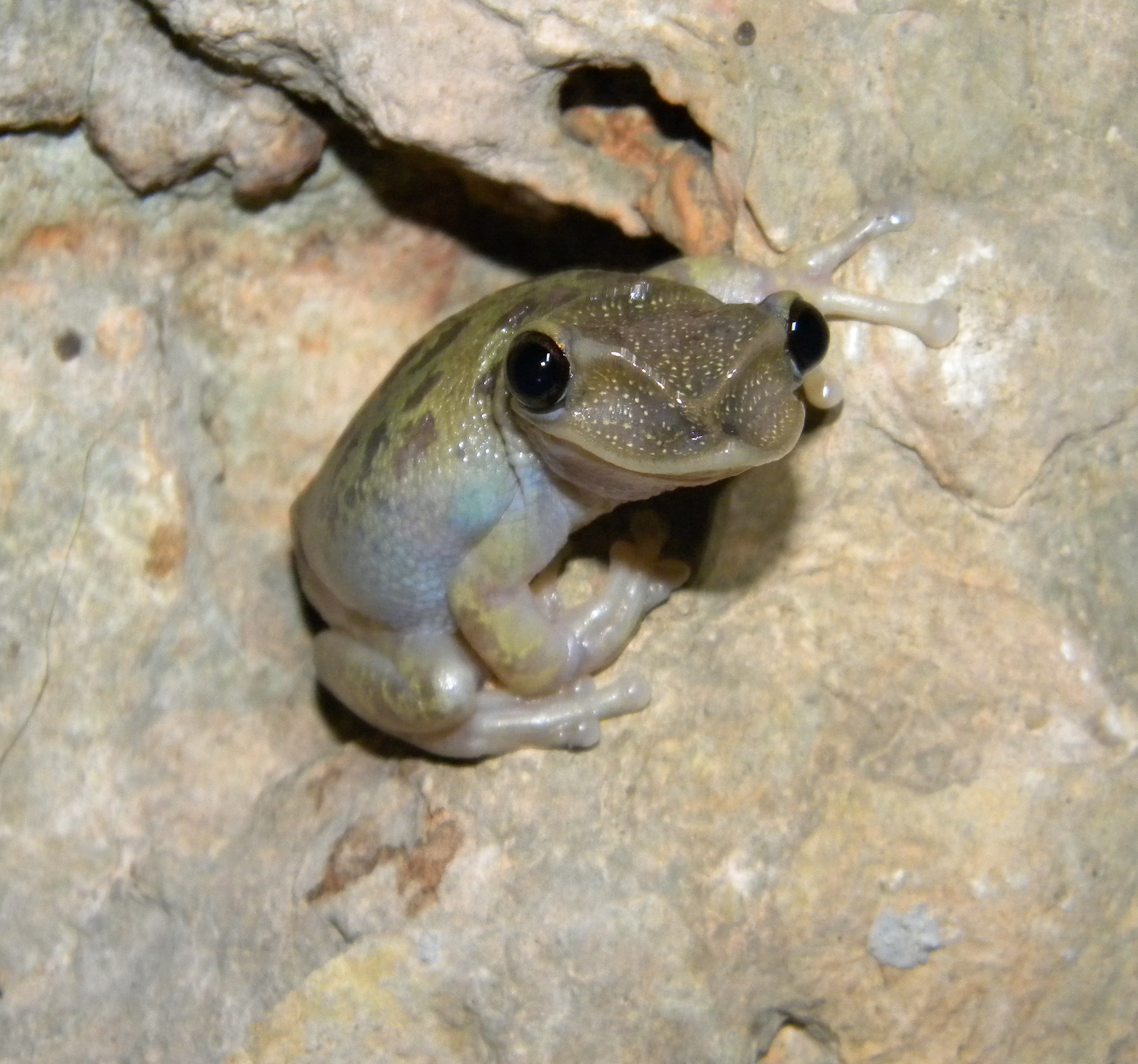
- Triprion petasatus

Scientific classification
- Kingdom: Animalia
- Phylum: Chordata
- Class: Amphibia
- Order: Anura
- Family: Hylidae
- Subfamily: Hylinae
- Genus: Triprion; Cope, 1866

Type species
- Pharyngodon petasatus Cope, 1865

Diversity
- 3 species

= Triprion =

Genus of amphibians

Triprion is a genus of frogs (the shovel-headed tree frogs) in the family Hylidae found in the Pacific lowlands of Mexico, the Yucatán Peninsula, and Guatemala. These frogs hide in tree-holes and plug the entrance with their strange-looking, bony heads.

== Species ==
Three species in this genus are recognized:

- Triprion petasatus (Cope, 1865) - Yucatán shovel-headed tree frog
- Triprion spatulatus Günther, 1882 - Mexican shovel-headed tree frog
- Triprion spinosus (Steindachner, 1864) - Spiny-headed tree frog
