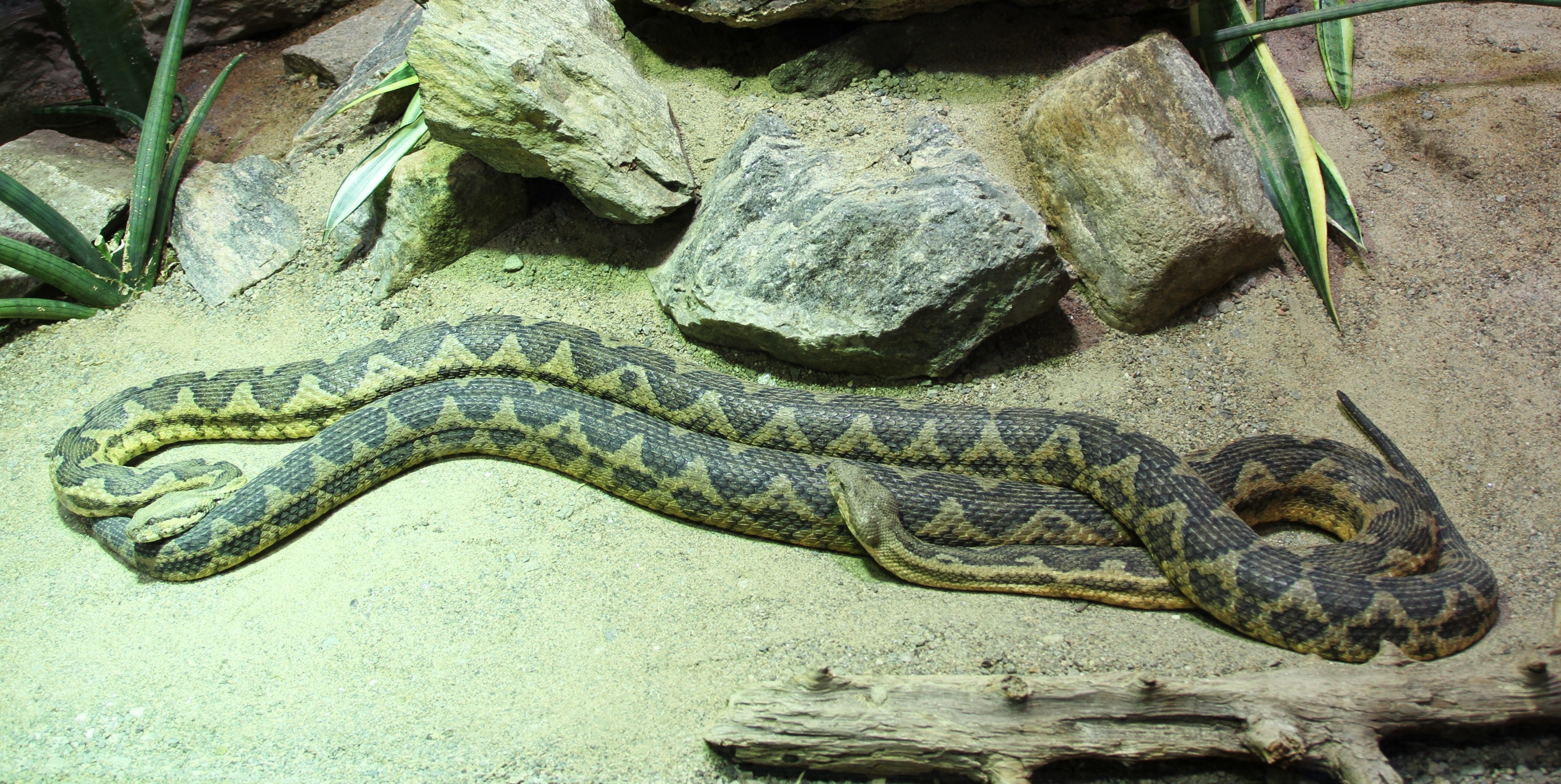

Conservation status
- Near Threatened (IUCN 3.1)

Scientific classification
- Kingdom: Animalia
- Phylum: Chordata
- Class: Reptilia
- Order: Squamata
- Suborder: Serpentes
- Family: Viperidae
- Genus: Daboia
- Species: D. mauritanica

Binomial name
- Daboia mauritanica (A.M.C. Duméril & Bibron, 1848)
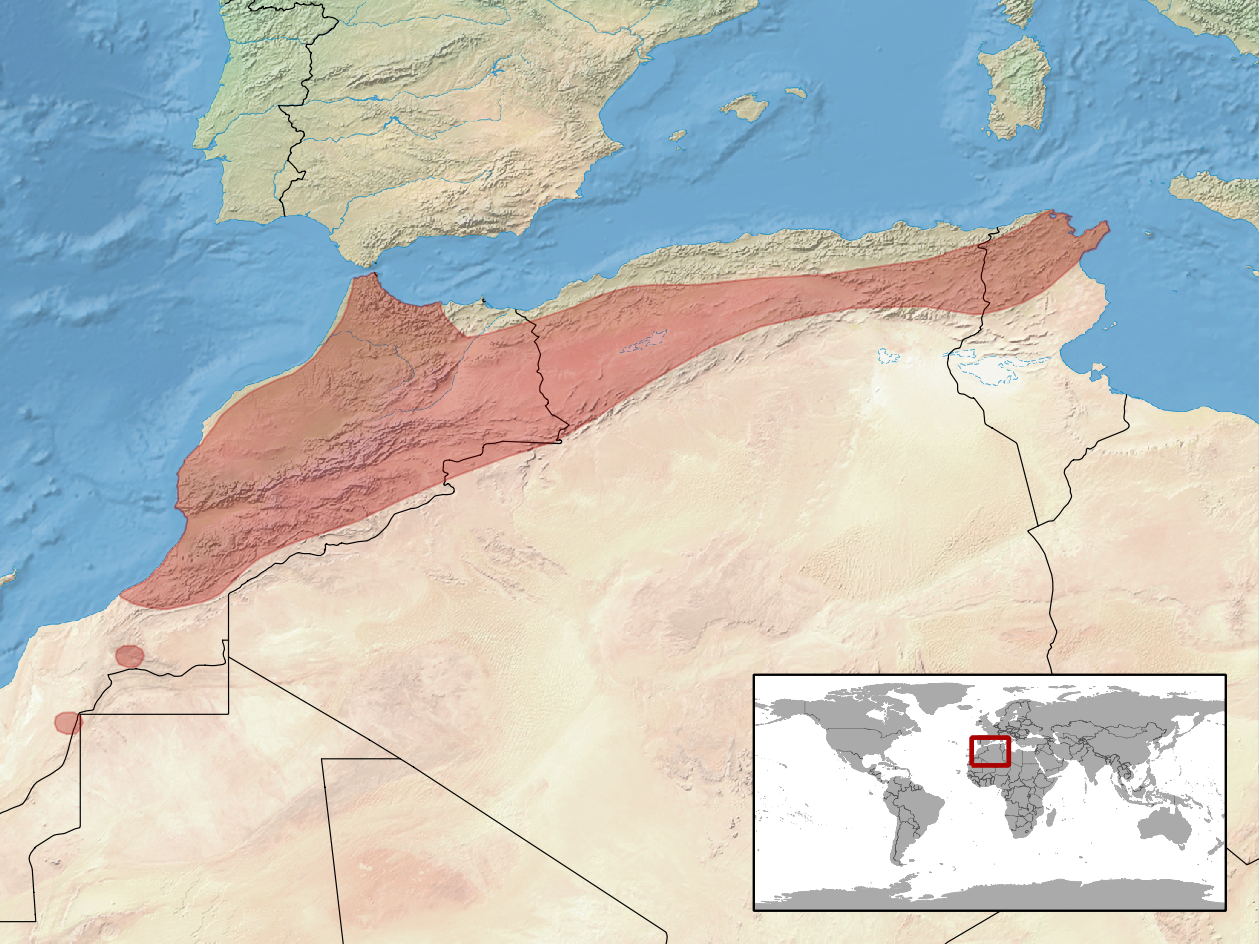

Synonyms
- Echidna mauritanica A.M.C. Duméril & Bibron, 1848; Clotho ? mauritanica Gray, 1849; Vipera minuta Eichwald, 1851; Bitis mauritanica — Günther, 1858; Vipera confluenta Cope, 1863; Vipera mauritanica — Strauch, 1869; Vipera euphratica var. mauritanica — Boettger, 1883; Vipera lebetina — Boulenger, 1896; Vipera lebetina mauritanica — Schwartz, 1936; Daboia (Daboia) lebetina mauritanica — Obst, 1983; Macrovipera mauritanica — Herrmann, Joger & Nilson, 1992

= Moorish viper =

Species of snake

The Moorish viper (Daboia mauritanica or Macrovipera mauritanica; common names: Moorish viper, Sahara rock viper, Atlas blunt-nosed viper, more) is a species of venomous snake in the subfamily Viperinae of the family Viperidae. The species is native to northwestern Africa. No subspecies are recognized as being valid.

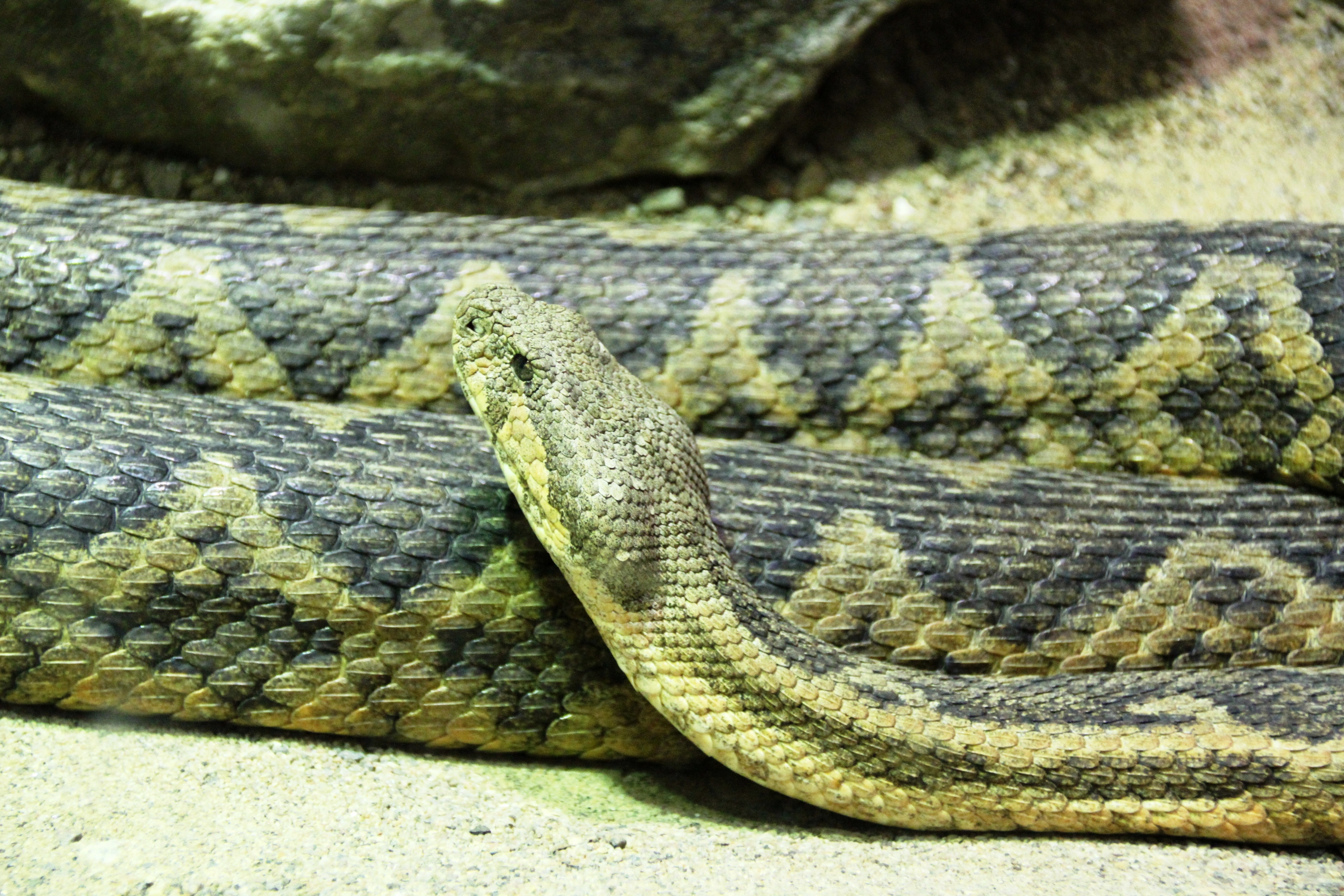
Universeum Science Park, Gothenburg, Sweden.

== Description ==
Daboia mauritanica reaches a maximum total length (tail included) of 1.8 m (5.9 ft).

== Common names ==
Common names for Daboia mauritanica include Moorish viper, Sahara rock viper, Atlas blunt-nosed viper, Atlas adder, and mountain adder.

== Geographic distribution ==
Daboia mauritanica is found in northwestern Africa: Morocco, Algeria and Tunisia. The type locality is "Algiers", according to Gray (1842), "Algeria" according to Schwarz (1936). It is limited to the coastal regions of Algeria. Coastal records from Tunisia may refer to Macrovipera deserti.

== Conservation status ==
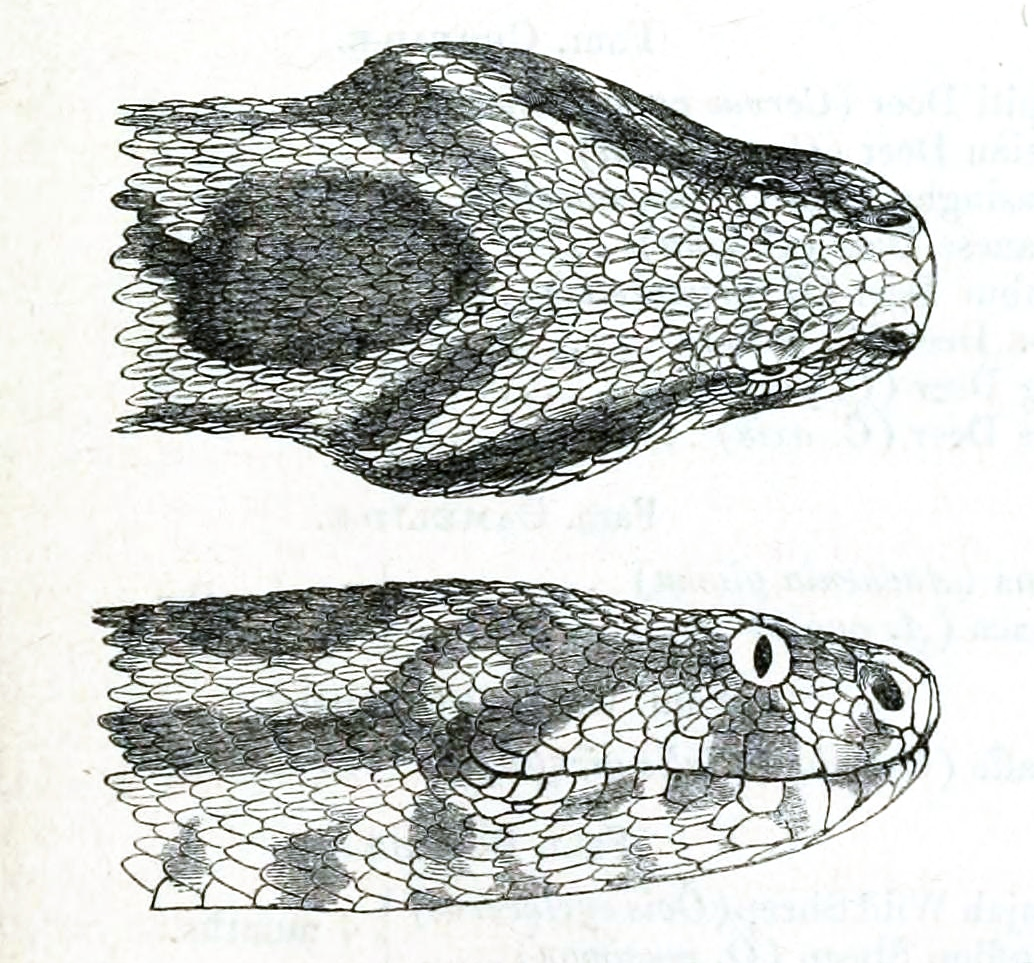

Daboia mauritanica is classified as Near Threatened (NT) according to the IUCN Red List of Threatened Species (v3.1, 2001). Classified as such because this species is likely in significant decline (but at a rate of less than 30% over ten years) due to persecution, accidental mortality and over-harvesting, therefore making it close to qualifying for Vulnerable. The population trend is down. Year assessed: 2005.

== Taxonomy ==
Based on molecular evidence, Lenk et al. (2001) suggested that this species, along with Macrovipera deserti, should rather be included in the genus Daboia.
