= Internasal =

Unpaired bone of the skull

The internasal is a dermal bone present in some vertebrates. When present, it is situated between the nasal bones, and forms a part of the dermatocranium.

== Evolution ==
The internasal is present ancestrally in actinopterygians, where it has been confused with the rostral, the postrostral, and the mesethmoid, or referred to as the "rostrodermethmoid" or "supraethmoid". In teleosts, it is often fused to the medial rostral.

Its presence has been recorded in extant coelocanths and lungfish, where multiple internasals are sometimes present. It is common in fossil basal tetrapods.

Among living tetrapods, an internasal is present among hynobiid salamanders, the frog Pternohyla, and the rodent Proechimys. Its presence in some species is subject to individual variation. It has been suggested that the internasal of frogs may be an atavistic occurrence of the postrostral bone. Another hypothesis suggests that the frog internasal is homologous to the "rostral" of frogs in the same clade.
