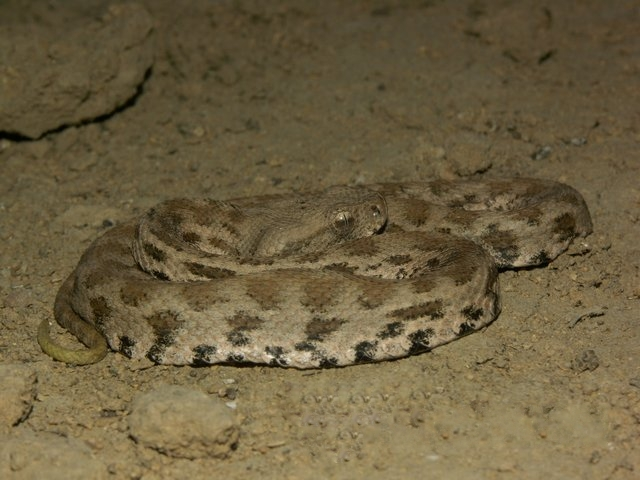
- Macrovipera lebetinus obtusa

Scientific classification
- Domain: Eukaryota
- Kingdom: Animalia
- Phylum: Chordata
- Class: Reptilia
- Order: Squamata
- Suborder: Serpentes
- Family: Viperidae
- Subfamily: Viperinae
- Genus: Macrovipera; A.F. Reuss, 1927

= Macrovipera =

Genus of snakes

Macrovipera, known as the large Palearctic vipers, is a genus of vipers that inhabit the semideserts and steppes of North Africa, the Near and Middle East, and the Milos Archipelago in the Aegean Sea. Like all other vipers, they are venomous. These snakes are responsible for a number of bites in Africa and Western Asia every year. They have a reputation for being ill-tempered and can inject a lot of venom, which is why they should be considered as very dangerous. Two species are currently recognized.

== Description ==
These snakes are all capable of exceeding 1.5 m (4.9 ft) in total length (body + tail).

The head is broad, flat, and distinct from the neck. Dorsally, it is covered with small, irregular keeled scales. The supraoculars are also fragmented or partially divided. There seems to be a lot of variation in the different scale characteristics.

== Geographic range ==
Species of this genus are found in Morocco, Algeria and Tunis in North Africa, east to Pakistan, Kashmir and India, north to the Milos Archipelago in the Aegean Sea (Greece), Azerbaijan, Armenia and Dagestan (Russia). To the south, there is only one old record from Yemen.

== Habitat ==
Members of this genus are adapted to arid and dry habitats.

== Reproduction ==
All of these species lay eggs (oviparous).

== Species ==
Species	Taxon author	Subsp.*	Common name	Geographic range
M. lebetinus^{T}	(Linnaeus, 1758)	5	Blunt-nosed viper	Dagestan, Algeria, Tunisia, Cyprus, Turkey, Syria, Lebanon, Iraq, Iran, Russian Caucasia, Armenia, Georgia, Azerbaijan, Turkmenistan, Uzbekistan, Kazakhstan, Tadzikhistan, Afghanistan, Pakistan and Kashmir.
M. razii	Oraie, Rastegar-Pouyani, Khosrovani, Moradi, Akbari, Sehhatisabet, Shafiei, Stumpel, & Joger, 2018	0	Razi's viper	Iran (Kerman)

*) Not including the nominate subspecies.
^{T}) Type species.

== Taxonomy ==
The genus Macrovipera was created by Francis Albert Theodor Reuss (1927), specifically to accommodate M. lebetinus (the type species). The three other species currently recognized were, at one point, all regarded as subspecies of M. lebetinus. It is now likely that certain subspecies of M. lebetinus will also be elevated to valid species status in the not too distant future. Regarding the geographic range of M. lebetinus, it is possible that this species is now extinct in Israel.

Various species of this genus (and likewise of Vipera) have been suggested for inclusion in the genus Daboia instead, in particular M. lebetinus (Obst 1983) as well as M. mauritanica and M. deserti (Lenk et al. (2001).
