= Supraocular scales =

Scale in reptiles

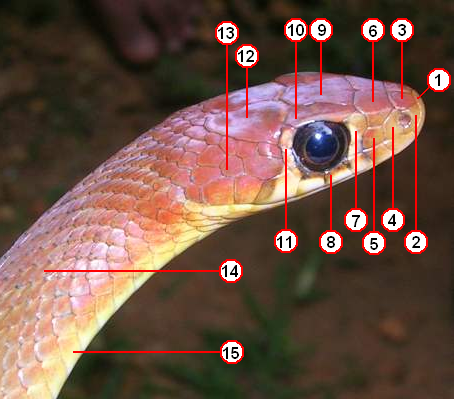
Scale labeled number 10

In scaled reptiles, supraocular scales are (enlarged) scales on the crown immediately above the eye. The size and shape of these scales are among the many characteristics used to differentiate species from each other.

In many species of boids and viperids, the supraoculars are heavily fragmented. In others, such as the colubrids and elapids, they are enlarged.

== See also ==
- Ocular scales
- Snake scales
- Anatomical terms of location
