= Aparallactus werneri =

Scientific classification
- Kingdom: Animalia
- Phylum: Chordata
- Class: Reptilia
- Order: Squamata
- Suborder: Serpentes
- Family: Atractaspididae
- Genus: Aparallactus
- Species: A. werneri

Binomial name
- Aparallactus werneri Boulenger, 1895

Species of snake

Aparallactus werneri, or the Usambara centipede-eater, is a species of mildly venomous rear-fanged snake in the family Lamprophiidae. The species is endemic to Tanzania.

== Etymology ==
The specific name, werneri, is in honor of Austrian herpetologist Franz Werner, from whom Boulenger obtained the type series of specimens.

== Geographic range ==
A. werneri is found in eastern Tanzania in Usambara and the Uluguru Mountains.

== Description ==
Dorsally, A. werneri is blackish with a deep black, light-edged nuchal collar. The upper lip is blackish below the eye, and yellowish in front of and behind the eye. Ventrally it is uniformly yellowish.

It may attain 39 cm (15 3/8 in) in total length, including a tail 6.5 cm (2 1/2 in) long.

The dorsal scales are smooth, without pits, and are arranged in 15 rows. The ventrals number 147-160. The anal plate is entire. The subcaudals number 32–41, and are also entire.

The portion of the rostral visible from above is nearly half as long as its distance from the frontal. The internasals are much shorter than the prefrontals. The frontal is one and a half times as long as broad, longer than its distance from the end of the snout, as long as the parietals. The nasal is entire, in contact with the preocular. There are two postoculars, both in contact with the anterior temporal. The temporals are arranged 1+1. There are six upper labials, the second and third entering the eye. The first lower labial is in contact with its fellow behind the mental. Three lower labials contact the anterior chin shield. There are two pairs of chin shields, the anterior pair broader and slightly longer than the posterior pair.

== Reproduction ==
A. werneri is oviparous.

== Taxonomy ==
A. werneri is sometimes placed in the subfamily Aparallactinae within the family Atractaspididae.
