= Aparallactus jacksonii =

Conservation status
- Least Concern (IUCN 3.1)

Scientific classification
- Kingdom: Animalia
- Phylum: Chordata
- Class: Reptilia
- Order: Squamata
- Suborder: Serpentes
- Family: Atractaspididae
- Genus: Aparallactus
- Species: A. jacksonii

Binomial name
- Aparallactus jacksonii (Günther, 1888)

Synonyms
- Uriechis jacksonii Günther, 1888; Aparallactus jacksonii — Boulenger, 1895

Species of snake

Aparallactus jacksonii, also known commonly as Jackson's centipede-eater, is a species of mildly venomous rear-fanged snake in the family Atractaspididae. The species is native to East Africa.

== Etymology ==
The specific epithet, jacksonii, is honor of English explorer and ornithologist Frederick John Jackson, who presented the type specimen to the British Museum (Natural History).

== Geographic range ==
A. jacksonii is found in Ethiopia, northern Tanzania, southern Sudan, Kenya, Somalia, and Uganda. The type locality is "Foot of Mt. Kilimanjaro".

== Habitat ==
The preferred natural habitats of A. jacksonii are savanna, shrubland, and grassland, at altitudes from sea level to 2,200 m (7,200 ft).

== Description ==
Jackson's centipede-eater is pale reddish brown dorsally, with a black vertebral line. Ventrally it is uniformly yellowish. The upper surface of the head and the nape of the neck are black. The nuchal blotch is edged with yellow, extending to the sides of the neck. There is a pair of yellow spots behind the parietal shields. The sides of the head are yellow, with the shields bordering the eye black.

The type specimen, a subadult female, measures 18 cm (7.1 in) in total length, 3 cm (1 1/8 in) of which is tail.

Portion of the rostral visible from above half as long as its distance from the frontal. Internasals much shorter than the prefrontals. Frontal 1½ times as long as broad, much longer than its distance from the end of the snout, slightly shorter than the parietals. Nasal entire, in contact with the preocular. Two postoculars, in contact with the anterior temporal. Seven upper labials, third and fourth entering the eye. First lower labial in contact with its fellow behind the mental. Two pairs of chin shields, subequal in length.

Dorsal scales smooth, without pits, in 15 rows. Ventrals 142; anal entire; subcaudals 36, entire.

== Reproduction ==
A. jacksonii is reported to be "viviparous", and as such is the only species in its genus to give birth to live young. Litter size is two or three neonates.
