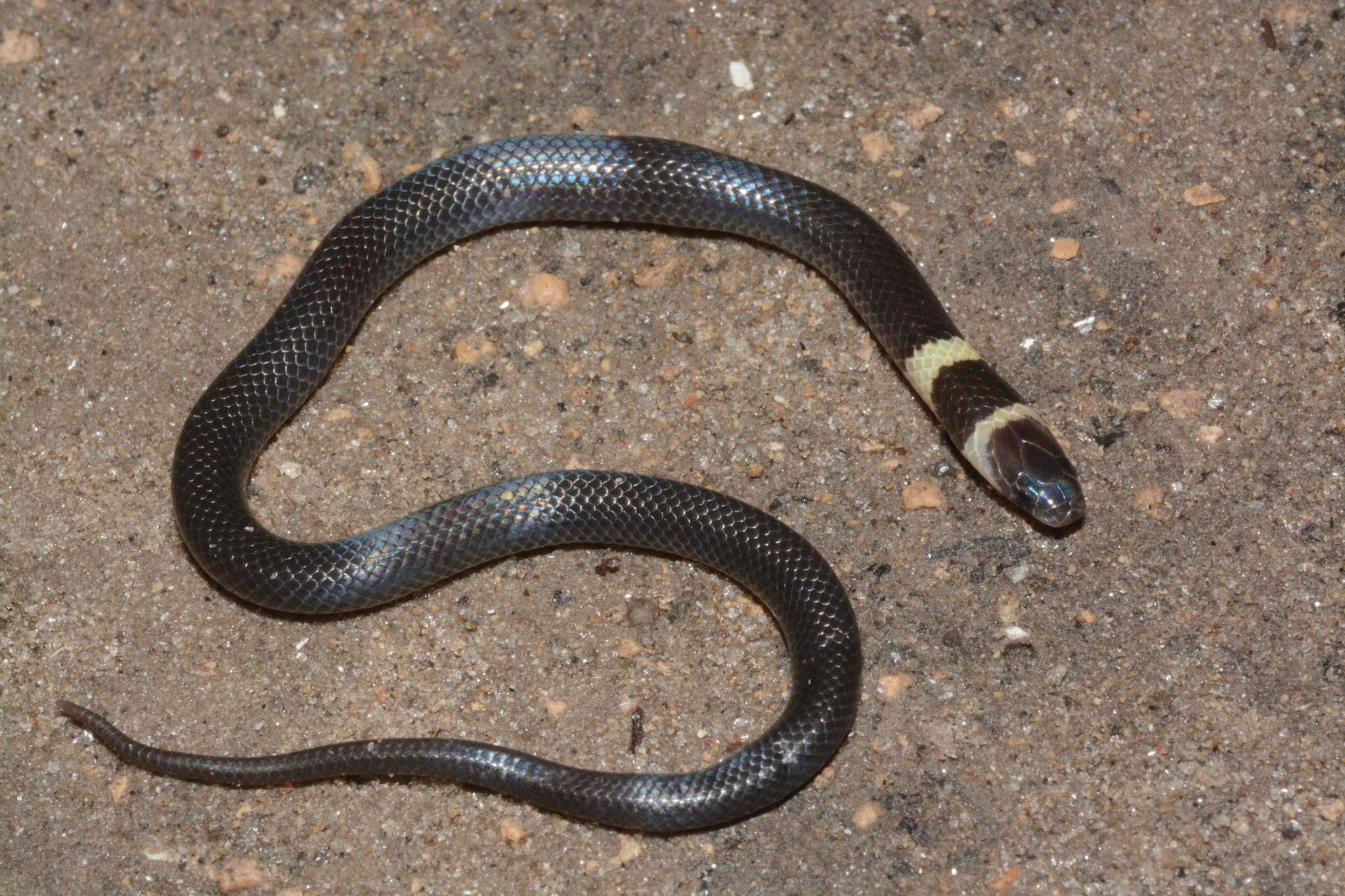

Scientific classification
- Kingdom: Animalia
- Phylum: Chordata
- Class: Reptilia
- Order: Squamata
- Suborder: Serpentes
- Family: Atractaspididae
- Genus: Aparallactus
- Species: A. guentheri

Binomial name
- Aparallactus guentheri Boulenger, 1895

Synonyms
- Aparallactus guentheri Boulenger, 1895; Aparallactus uluguruensis Barbour & Loveridge, 1928; Aparallactus capensis uluguruensis — Loveridge, 1944; Aparallactus guentheri — de Witte & Laurent, 1947

= Aparallactus guentheri =

Species of snake

Aparallactus guentheri, or the black centipede-eater, is a species of mildly venomous rear-fanged snake in the family Atractaspididae. The species is endemic to Africa.

== Etymology ==
The specific epithet, guentheri, is in honor of German-British herpetologist Albert Günther, who preceded George Albert Boulenger at the British Museum (Natural History).

== Distribution ==
A. guentheri is found in Angola, Kenya, Malawi, Mozambique, Tanzania (including Zanzibar), Zambia, and Zimbabwe.

== Description ==
A. guentheri is blackish brown dorsally, a little lighter ventrally. The chin and throat are yellowish white. It has a deep black collar, edged with yellowish white in front and behind, narrowly interrupted on the throat.

Adults may attain a total length of 33 cm (13 in), with a tail 8 cm (3 1/8 in) long.

The portion of the rostral visible from above is nearly half as long as its distance from the frontal. The frontal is 1½ times as long as broad, much longer than its distance from the end of the snout, a little shorter than the parietals. The nasal is divided, in contact with the preocular. There is one postocular. There are seven upper labials, the third and fourth entering the eye, the fifth in contact with the parietal. The mental is in contact with the anterior chin shields, which are as long as and a little broader than the posterior chin shields. The anterior chin shields are in contact with four lower labials.

The dorsal scales are smooth, without pits, in 15 rows. The anal is entire. The subcaudals number 51–59, and are entire (undivided).
