= Calamaria eiselti =

Conservation status
- Data Deficient (IUCN 3.1)

Scientific classification
- Kingdom: Animalia
- Phylum: Chordata
- Class: Reptilia
- Order: Squamata
- Suborder: Serpentes
- Family: Colubridae
- Genus: Calamaria
- Species: C. eiselti

Binomial name
- Calamaria eiselti Inger & Marx, 1965
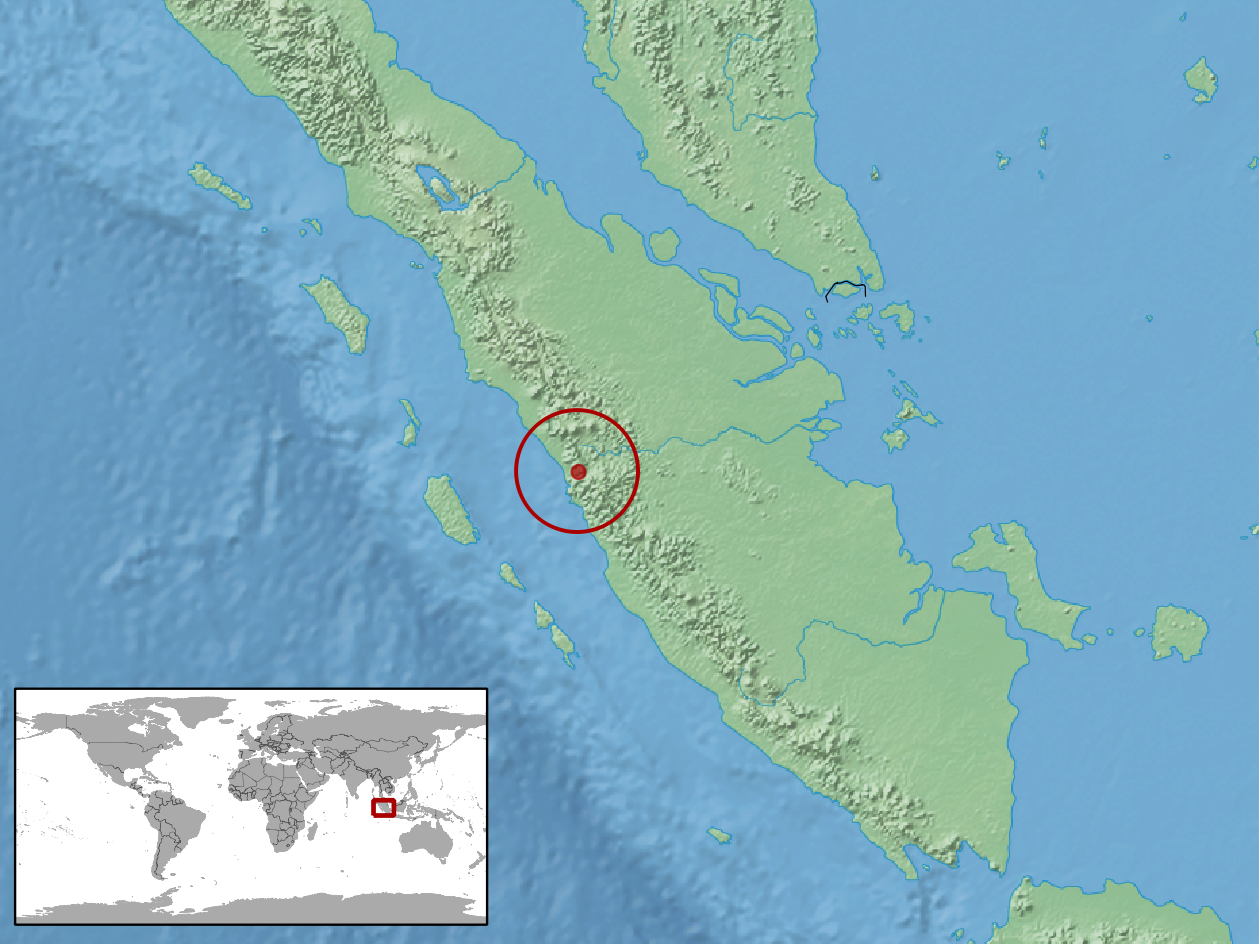

Species of snake

Calamaria eiselti, also known commonly as Eiselt's reed snake, is a species of snake in the subfamily Calamariinae of the family Colubridae. The species is endemic to Sumatra in Indonesia.

== Etymology ==
The specific name, eiselti, is in honor of Austrian herpetologist Josef Eiselt.

== Description ==
Calamaria eiselti exhibits the following diagnostic characters. The mental is in contact with the anterior chin shields. A preocular is present. The third and fourth upper labials are in contact with the eye. Ventrally, on the posterior half of the body, it is black with yellow dots. Ventrally, the tail is yellow with 1–3 black crossbars, which may be incomplete.

== Habitat ==
The preferred natural habitat of Calamaria eiselti is forest.

== Behavior ==
Calamaria eiselti is terrestrial and fossorial.

== Reproduction ==
Calamaria eiselti is oviparous.
