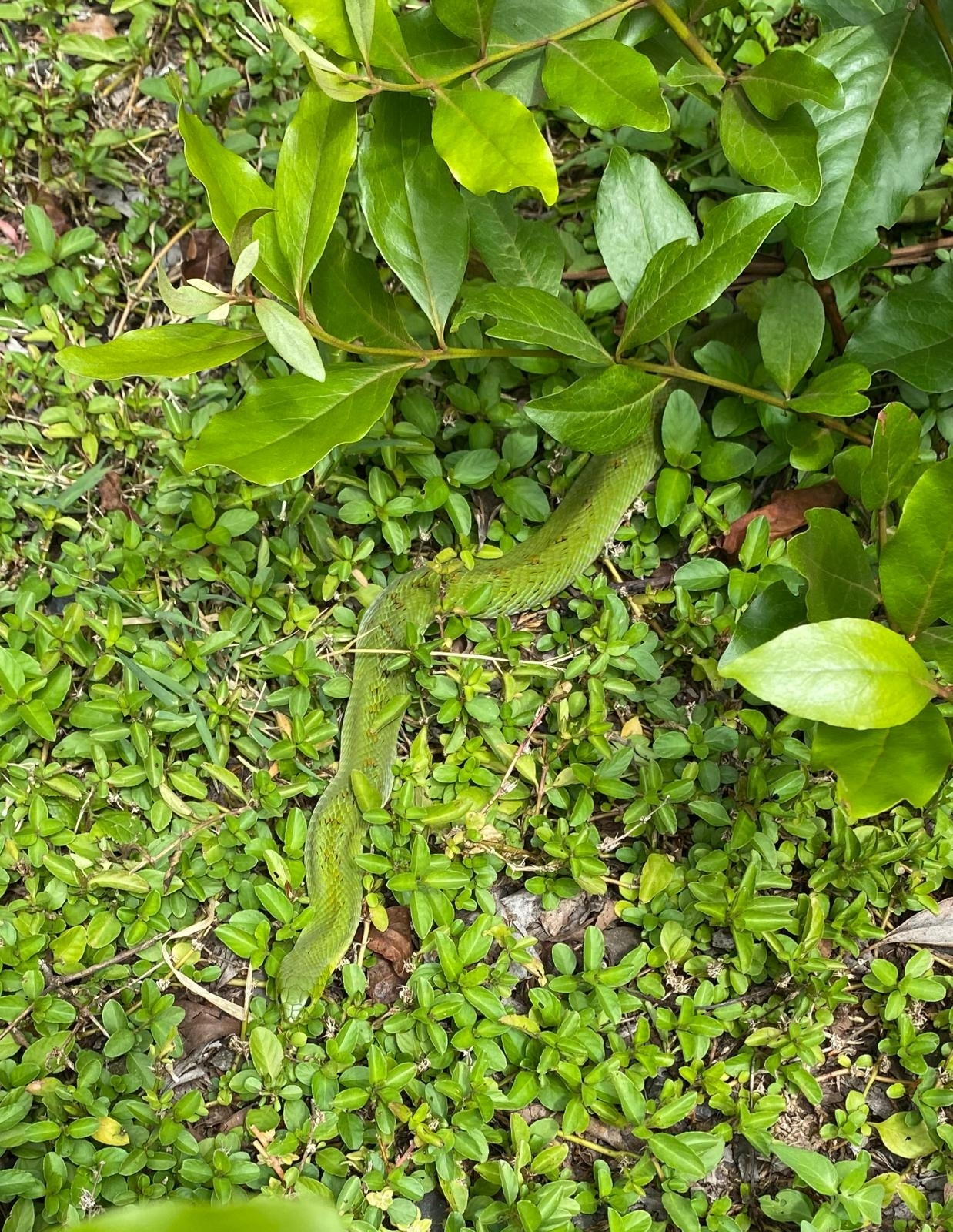
- Causus resimus in Kenya

Conservation status
- Least Concern (IUCN 3.1)

Scientific classification
- Kingdom: Animalia
- Phylum: Chordata
- Class: Reptilia
- Order: Squamata
- Suborder: Serpentes
- Family: Viperidae
- Genus: Causus
- Species: C. resimus

Binomial name
- Causus resimus (W. Peters, 1862)

Synonyms
- Heterophis resimus W. Peters, 1862; Causus resimus — Bocage, 1886; Causus Jacksonii Günther, 1888; Causus nasalis Stejneger, 1893; C[ausus] resimus var. angolensis Bocage, 1895; Causus resimus — Boulenger, 1896

= Causus resimus =

Species of snake

Causus resimus, or green-night adder, is a species of venomous snake in the subfamily Viperinae of the family Viperidae. The species is found in isolated populations distributed across tropical Africa. There are no subspecies that are recognized as being valid.

== Description ==
As an adult, C. resimus usually has a total length (tail included) of 30–60 cm (12–24 in), with a maximum recorded total length of 75 cm (30 in). It appears relatively stout.

The head is short, with an upturned snout, and slightly distinct from the neck. The circumorbital ring includes 2 preoculars, 2 postoculars and 1–2 subocular scales. There are 6–7 sublabials. The temporal scales number 2+3 (rarely 2+4).

At midbody there are 19–22 rows of faintly keeled dorsal scales that have a velvety appearance. There are 131–155 ventral scales. The anal scale is single. There are 16–27 paired subcaudals.

The color pattern consists of a green ground color that may be anything from bright green to olive. This is overlaid with a series dark inverted chevron-like crossbars that run down the back, similar to C. defilippii and C. rhombeatus. The chin and throat are yellow. The belly is a yellowish, cream or pearly in color.

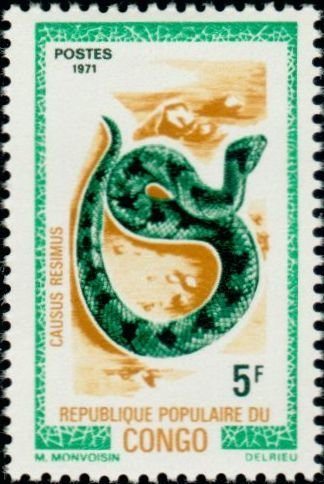
Causus resimus on a tamp of the Republic of the Congo

== Common names ==
Common names for C. resimus include green night adder, velvety-green night adder, and green viper.

== Geographic range ==
C. resimus is found in Central and eastern Africa from Nigeria east to Sudan, Uganda, Ethiopia, Kenya, Somalia, and south to Tanzania, Rwanda, Burundi, and Democratic Republic of the Congo. An isolated population occurs in western Angola. The type locality is listed as "Sennâr, vom Gebel-Ghule" (Jebel Ghule, Sennar, Sudan).

== Habitat ==
The preferred natural habitats of C. resimus are low-lying moist savanna, wooded hills, high grasslands, and the riparian zones of rivers that run through swamps, rocky gorges, coastal scrubland, and semi-deserts. It is also known to occur in man-made habitats, such as abandoned quarries, sugar cane plantations, and in borrow pit pools along roads. It has been found at altitudes from sea level to 1,800 m (5,900 ft).

== Behavior ==
If disturbed, C. resimus inflates itself and puts on a ferocious hissing and puffing threat display. The front part of the body is raised and coiled, from which position it tends to make sweeping and lashing strikes as opposed to a stabbing motion. It is mostly terrestrial, but is also a good swimmer and has been known to climb into sedges in pursuit of prey. Despite the term "night adder" in some of its common names, it is diurnal and is often seen basking. It hides under cover on the ground when not active.

== Reproduction ==
C. resimus is oviparous. Clutch size is 4–12 eggs. In Somalia, eggs are laid in July.

== Venom ==
Little is known about the venom of C. resimus, but it is presumed to be similar to that of other species in the genus Causus.
