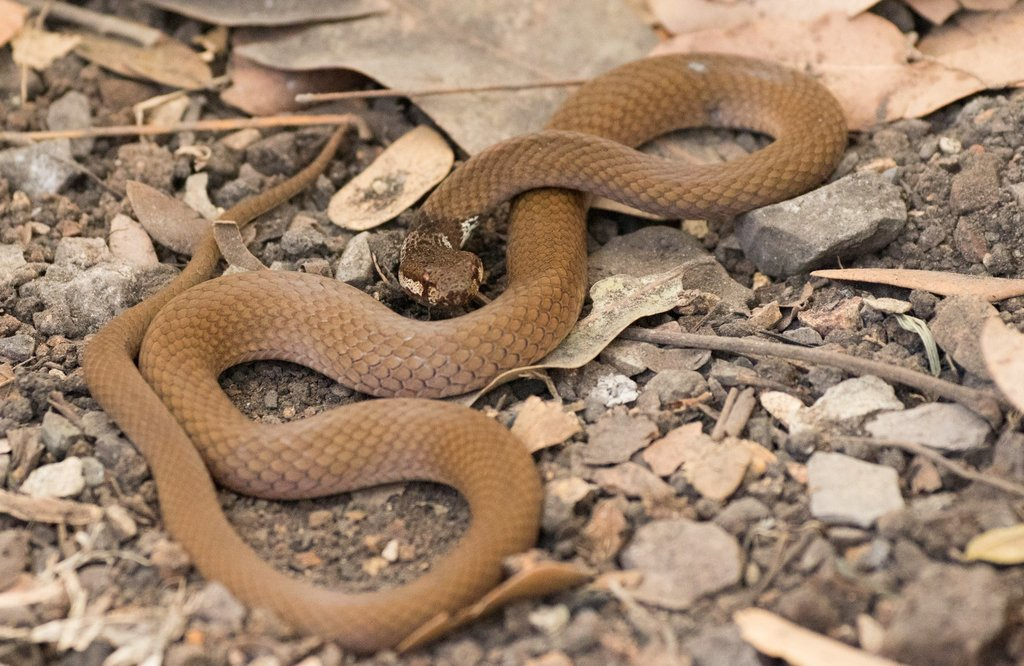

Conservation status
- Least Concern (IUCN 3.1)

Scientific classification
- Kingdom: Animalia
- Phylum: Chordata
- Class: Reptilia
- Order: Squamata
- Suborder: Serpentes
- Family: Elapidae
- Genus: Aspidomorphus
- Species: A. muelleri

Binomial name
- Aspidomorphus muelleri (Schlegel, 1837)

Synonyms
- Elaps muelleri Schlegel, 1837; Pseudelaps muelleri (Schlegel, 1837)

= Aspidomorphus muelleri =

Species of snake

Aspidomorphus muelleri, also known commonly as Müller's crown snake and Müller's crowned snake, is a species of venomous snake in the subfamily Hydrophiinae of the family Elapidae. The species is native to Oceania. There are three recognized subspecies.

== Etymology ==
The specific name, muelleri, is in honor of German naturalist Salomon Müller.

== Description ==
Aspidomorphus muelleri may attain a total length of 50 cm (20 in), including a tail length of 7 cm (2.8 in). It has six upper labials, the third and fourth in contact with the eye. The dorsal scales are arranged in 15 rows at midbody. The anal plate is divided.

== Geographic distribution ==
Aspidomorphus muelleri is found in Indonesia and Papua New Guinea.

== Habitat ==
The preferred natural habitats of Aspidomorphus muelleri are forest, shrubland, and grassland, at elevations of 500–1,500 m (1,600–4,900 ft).

== Behavior ==
Aspidomorphus muelleri is terrestrial.

== Reproduction ==
Aspidomorphus muelleri is oviparous.

== Subspecies ==
The following three subspecies of Aspidomorphus muelleri are recognized as being valid, including the nominotypical subspecies.

- Aspidomorphus muelleri muelleri (Schlegel, 1837)
- Aspidomorphus muelleri interruptus Brongersma, 1934
- Aspidomorphus muelleri lineatus Brongersma, 1934
