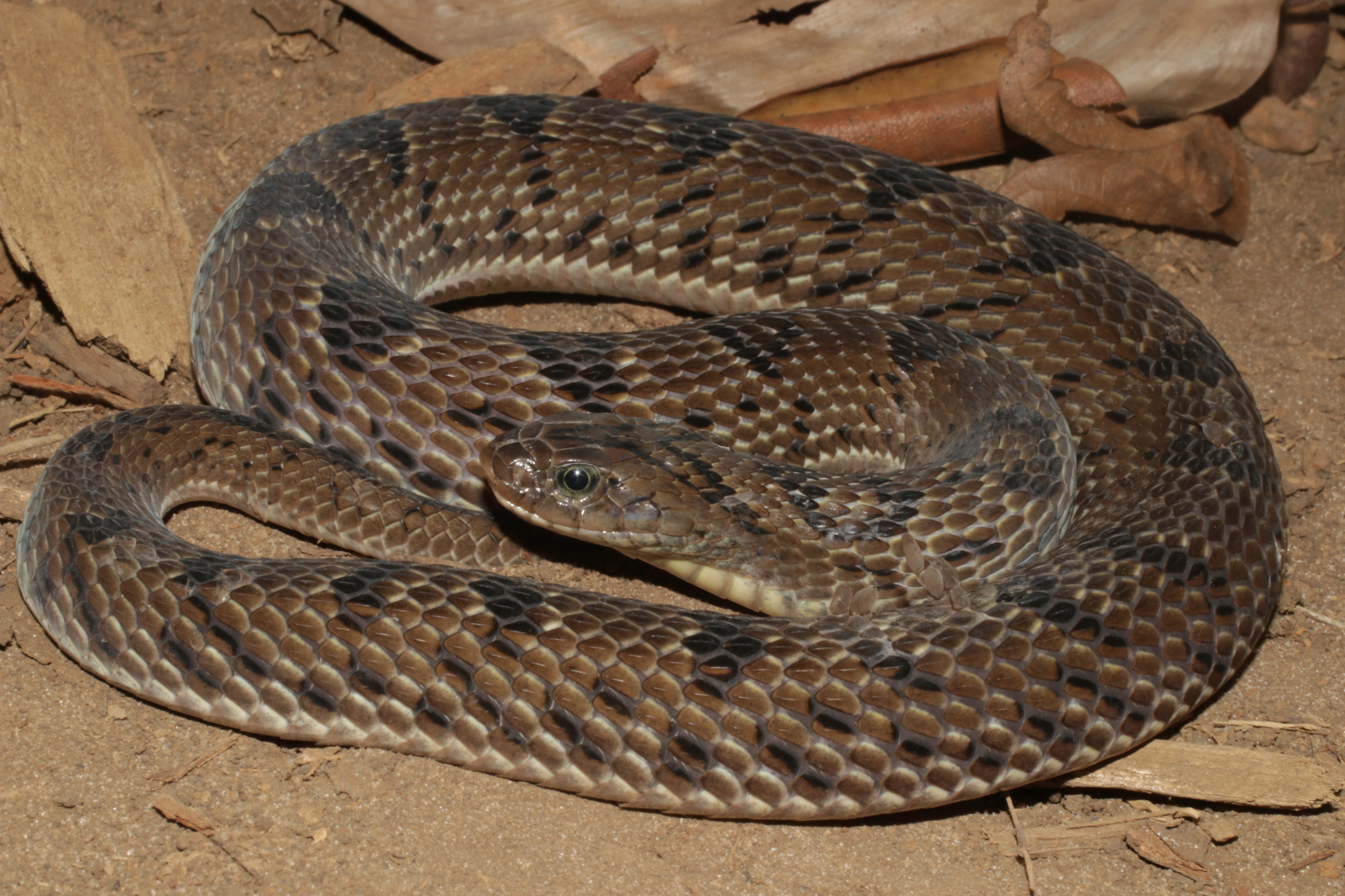
- Causus maculatus in Gabon

Conservation status
- Least Concern (IUCN 3.1)

Scientific classification
- Kingdom: Animalia
- Phylum: Chordata
- Class: Reptilia
- Order: Squamata
- Suborder: Serpentes
- Family: Viperidae
- Genus: Causus
- Species: C. maculatus

Binomial name
- Causus maculatus (Hallowell, 1842)

Synonyms
- Distichurus maculatus Hallowell, 1842; Causus rhombeatus maculatus — Laurent, 1956; Causus maculatus — Laurent, 1964

= Causus maculatus =

Species of snake

Causus maculatus is species of venomous snake in the subfamily Viperinae of the family Viperidae. The species is native to West Africa and Central Africa. There are no subspecies that are recognized as being valid. Common names include forest rhombic night adder, West African night adder, and spotted night adder.

== Description ==
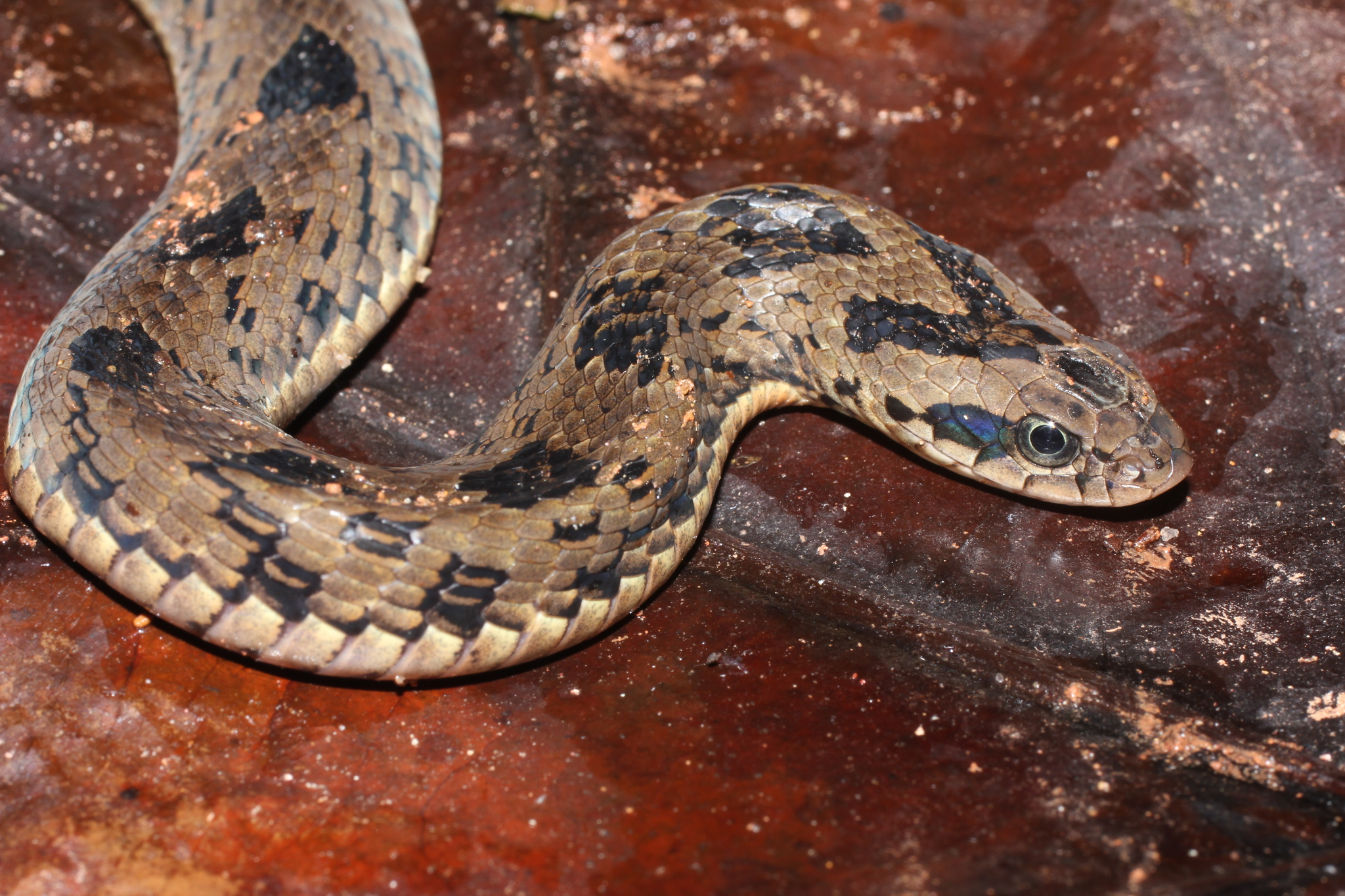
Head close-up, Liberia

C. maculatus is small and stout, with an average total length (tail included) of 30–60 cm (12–24 in). It grows to a maximum total length of about 70 cm (28 in), or perhaps slightly longer.

The snout is obtuse with a rounded rostral scale. A single loreal is present. The circumorbital ring consists of 2–3 preoculars, 1–2 postoculars and 1–2 suboculars. There are 6 supralabials and 9–10 sublabials. Four sublabials are in contact with the sublinguals. There are 2–3 temporal scales.

At midbody there are 17–19 rows of dorsal scales. The ventral scales number 118–137 in females and 124–144 in males. The subcaudal scales number 14–23 in females and 15–26 in males. Within the geographic range of this species, the ventral scale counts increase from south to north and from east to west. This diagnostic information is apparently according to Hughes (1977).

Spawls and Branch (1995) give a slightly different description of the body scalation: at midbody there are 17–22 rows of dorsal scales, which have been described as soft and feebly keeled. The ventral scales number 124–151 in females and 118–154 in males, with the highest numbers found in specimens from Uganda and Ethiopia.

The color pattern usually consists of a brown ground color, sometimes grayish, olive or light green, with a series of dark brown or blackish patches down the back (this pattern is less distinct on the first quarter of the body). The flanks are sprinkled with black scales. There is much variation in the dorsal pattern; some specimens, especially those from more arid regions, may have no pattern at all, making them hard to identify. Those from DR Congo are often a uniform brown. The belly may be white, cream or pinkish-gray. The ventral scales may be uniform in color, but sometimes each scale grades from light to dark, giving the belly a finely barred appearance. The head usually has a distinct V-shaped mark. This mark may be solid black in juveniles, but in adults it becomes brown with a black outline. Sometimes, a short dark line is present extending backwards from the posterior of the eye.

== Geographic range ==
C. maculatus is found from Mauritania and Senegal east to western Ethiopia, south to DR Congo and northern Angola. The type locality is listed as "Liberia, Western Africa."

Mallow et al. (2003) mostly quote Spawls and Branch (1995), giving the geographic range as West Africa and Central Africa, from Senegal east to Chad, southeast to the Democratic Republic of the Congo, and northeast into southeastern Sudan. It is also found in the river gorges and low country of southwestern Ethiopia, southwest to northern Angola and DR Congo.

== Habitat ==
C. maculatus is found in a wide range of habitats, including forests, savanna, and even semi-desert. It may be quite abundant in parts of its geographic range. It has been found at altitudes as high as 2,400 m (7,900 ft).

== Behavior ==
C. maculatus is terrestrial, but is known to climb into low bushes in pursuit of frogs. It is a relatively slow moving species of snake, but it can strike quickly, tending to lash rather than to stab. Despite its common names including the term "night adder", this species is known to be active at any time of the day, evening or night, and has sometimes been seen sunning itself. It is most active during the rainy season (March–October) when its prey is available, virtually disappearing during the dry season.

== Diet ==
C. maculatus preys predominately upon frogs and toads.

== Reproduction ==
C. maculatus is oviparous. An adult female may lay a clutch of 6–20 eggs in February–April, with the hatchlings appearing in May–July.

== Venom ==
Bites from C. maculatus result in mild symptoms that include pain, moderate swelling, local lymphadenitis, and mild fever. Blistering has not been reported, while necrosis is rare and usually secondary. The symptoms disappear after two to three days and normally without any complications. No existing antivenins are known to counteract this venom.

== Taxonomy ==
This species, C. maculatus, was previously considered to be a subspecies of C. rhombeatus.
