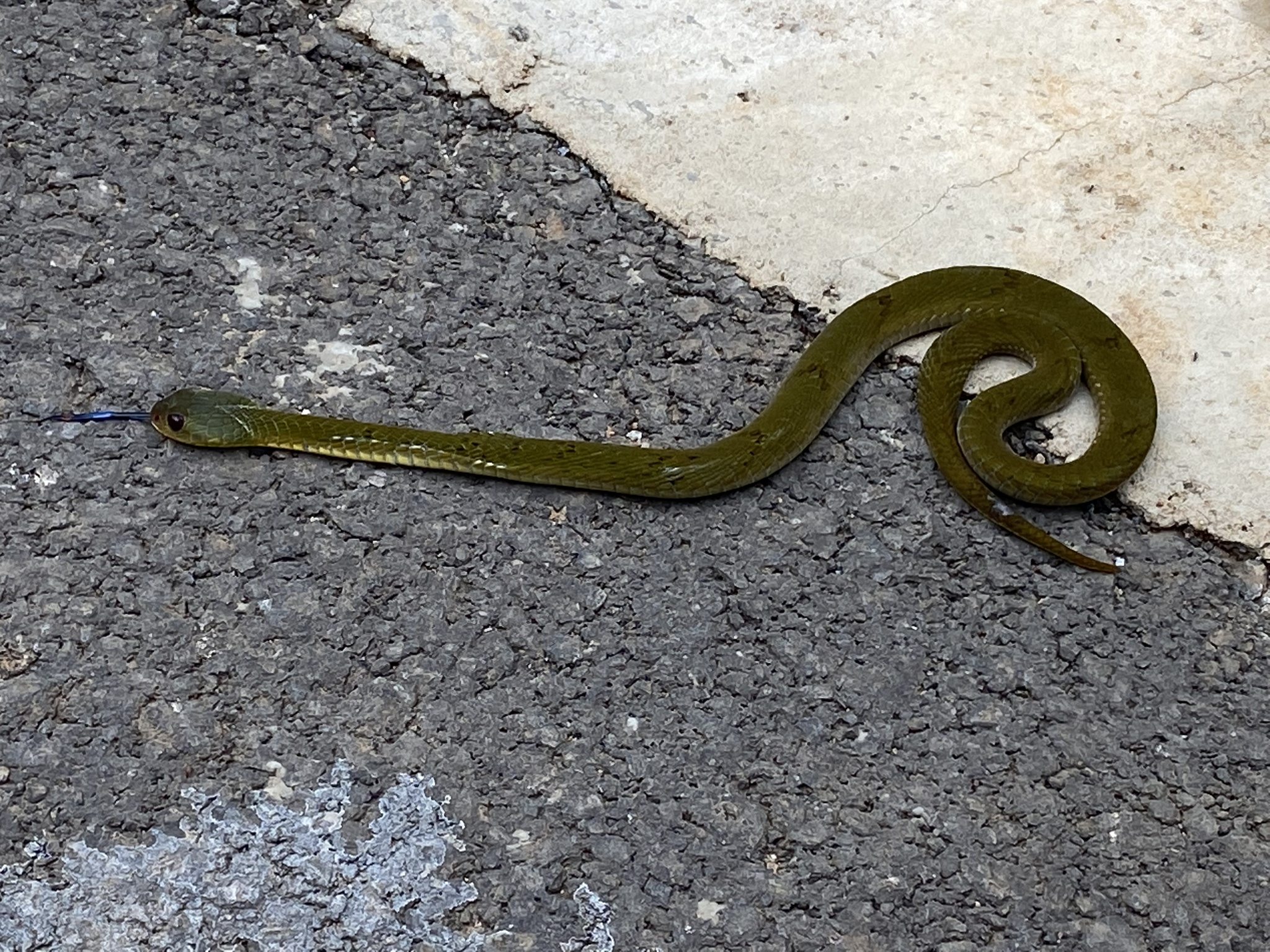
- Causus lichtensteinii in Uganda

Conservation status
- Least Concern (IUCN 3.1)

Scientific classification
- Kingdom: Animalia
- Phylum: Chordata
- Class: Reptilia
- Order: Squamata
- Suborder: Serpentes
- Family: Viperidae
- Genus: Causus
- Species: C. lichtensteinii

Binomial name
- Causus lichtensteinii (Jan, 1859)

Synonyms
- Aspedilaps Lichtensteinii Jan, 1859; Causus lichtensteinii — A.H.A. Duméril, 1859; Aspedilaps (Causus) Lichtensteini — Jan, 1863; Aspedilaps Lichtensteini — Jan & Sordelli, 1873; Dinodipsas angulifera W. Peters, 1882; Causus lichtensteinii — Boulenger, 1896; Causus lichtensteini — de Witte, 1962

= Causus lichtensteinii =

Species of snake

Causus lichtensteinii is a species of venomous snake in the subfamily Viperinae of the family Viperidae. The species is native to western, central, and eastern Africa. There are no subspecies that are recognized as being valid.

== Etymology ==
The specific name, or epithet, lichtensteinii, honors German herpetologist Martin Hinrich Lichtenstein.

== Common names ==
Common names for C. lichtensteinii include Lichtenstein's night adder, the forest night adder, and the olive-green viper.

== Description ==
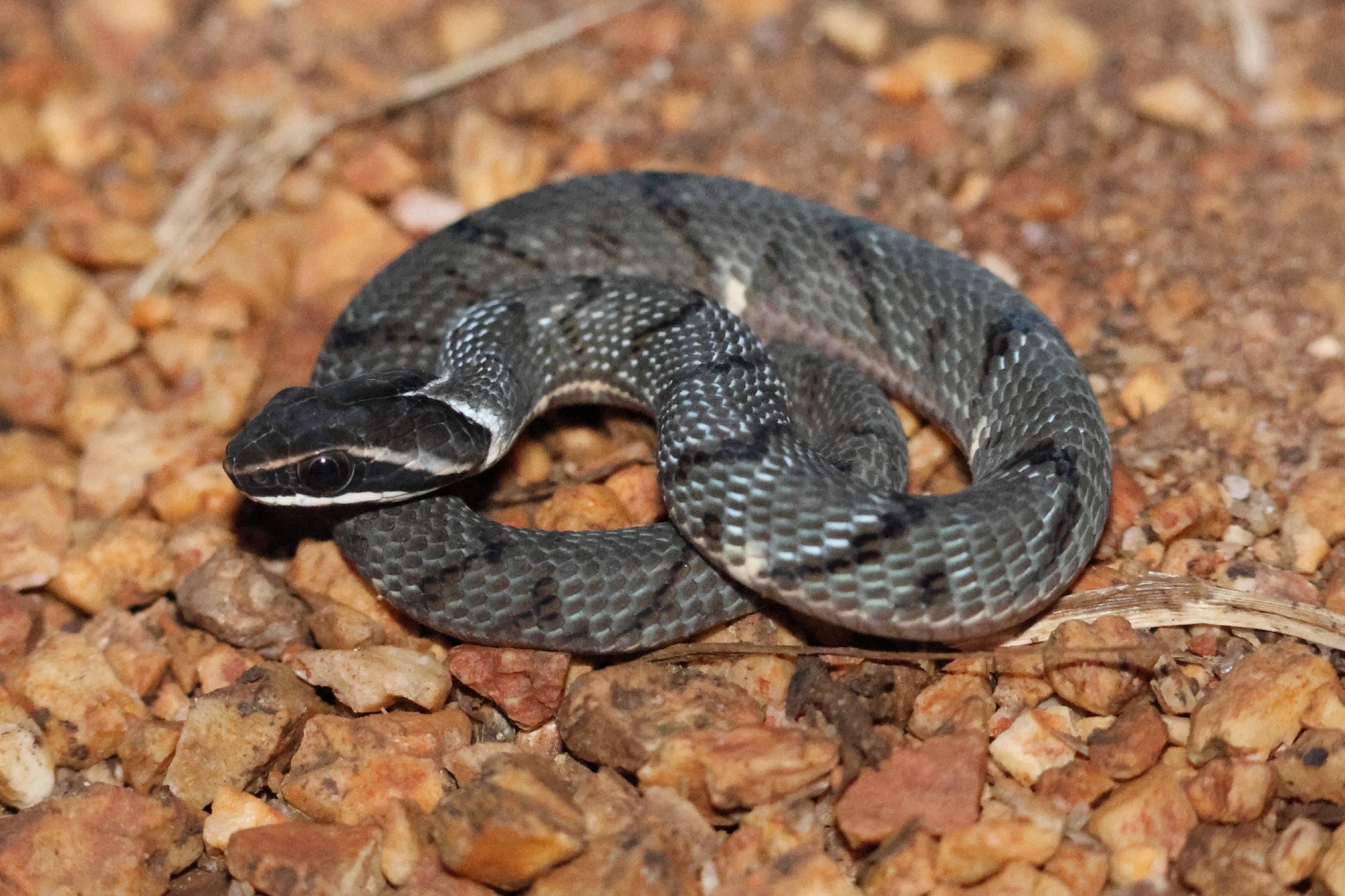
Juvenile in Uganda

Adults of C. lichtensteinii average 30–55 cm (12–22 in) in total length (tail included), with a reported maximum of 70 cm (28 in).

The head is not very wide, and the snout is blunt. The eye is surrounded by a circumorbital ring of 5–7 scales. There are 6 supralabials and 9 sublabials. The temporals number 2+3 or sometimes 2+2, with the first and second upper temporals being as long together as the first lower one. Loreals: 1+1. Midbody there are 15 rows of weakly keeled dorsal scales that have a velvety texture. The anal scale is single. There are 128–152 ventral scales. The subcaudals number 18–22 in males and 17–19 in females.

The color pattern consists of a greenish or olive ground color overlaid with a series of dark narrow backward pointing chevrons running down the back. This pattern may be vague or developed fully into rhombic markings. The back of the neck has a characteristic white V-shape while the throat is black with yellow bands. Juvenile specimens are generally dark brown in color.

== Geographic range ==
C. lichtensteinii is found from Guinea and Liberia eastward through Ghana to Nigeria, Cameroon, Equatorial Guinea, the Central African Republic, south to northern Angola, DR Congo and northwestern Zambia, and east to Uganda and western Kenya.

The type locality is listed as "Côte-d'Or " [= Gold Coast, now Dominion of Ghana].

== Habitat ==
As opposed to other members of its genus, C. lichtensteinii is mostly found in pristine rain forests with little light filtering down to the forest floor. It tends to be found near water in swampy areas. In the Atewa Range Forest Reserve in Ghana it has been found at altitudes of up to 670 m (2,200 ft).

== Behavior ==
C. lichtensteinii is diurnal and mostly terrestrial. However, it is a good swimmer and has even colonized certain islands in Lake Victoria. When disturbed it puts on a hissing and puffing threat display similar to other members of the genus.

== Reproduction ==
C. lichtensteinii is oviparous. Clutch size is four to eight eggs.

== Venom ==
Little is known about the venom of C. lichtensteinii.
