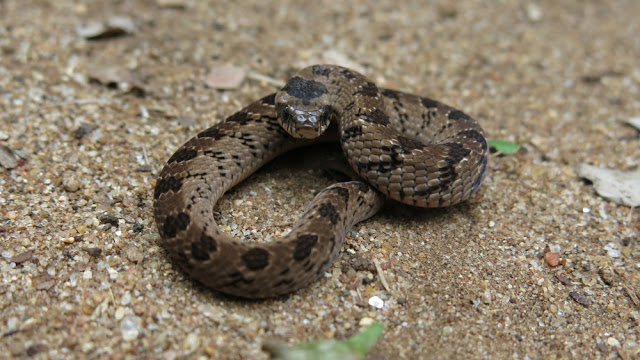

Conservation status
- Least Concern (IUCN 3.1)

Scientific classification
- Kingdom: Animalia
- Phylum: Chordata
- Class: Reptilia
- Order: Squamata
- Suborder: Serpentes
- Family: Viperidae
- Genus: Causus
- Species: C. defilippii

Binomial name
- Causus defilippii (Jan, 1863)

Synonyms
- H[eterodon]. De Filippii Jan, 1863; Causus (Heterophis) rostratus Günther, 1863; Causus rostratus — Mocquard, 1892; Causus defilippii — Mocquard, 1892; Causus defilippii — Boulenger, 1896; Causus dephillippii Rose, 1955 (ex errore)

= Causus defilippii =

Species of snake

Causus defilippii, also known commonly as the snouted night adder, is a species of venomous snake in the subfamily Viperinae of the family Viperidae. The species is native to East Africa and Southern Africa. Although its venom is nonlethal to humans, it is still considered medically significant. There are no subspecies that are recognized as being valid.

== Etymology ==
The specific name, defilippii, is in honor of Italian zoologist Filippo De Filippi.

== Description ==
The average total length (including tail) of C. defilippii is 20–35 cm (8–14 in), rarely exceeding 50 cm (20 in).

The head is short and wide, and the snout is prominent, pointed and upturned. The rostral is large. The eyes are medium-sized. The circumorbital ring consists of 1–2 preocular scales, 1–2 postoculars and 1–2 suboculars that separate the eye from the supralabials. There are a total of 6–7 supralabials and 7–10 sublabials. The first 3–4 sublabials are in contact with the anterior chin shields. The posterior chin shields are very small and indistinguishable from other posterior scales. The temporal scales number 2+3, sometimes 2+4, and rarely 1+2.

Midbody there are 16–18 rows of weakly keeled dorsal scales that have a velvety appearance. There are 108–128 ventral scales: rarely more than 117 in males, or less than 118 in females. The anal scale is single. The divided subcaudals number 10–19: seldom less than 14 in males, or more than 15 in females.

The color pattern consists of a light brown, pinkish brown to gray or grayish green ground color, overlaid with a series of 20–30 crescent-shaped dark markings that run down the back. However, these marking may be indistinct. The head has a characteristic V-shaped marking with the apex on the frontal plate. There is also an oblique dark streak present behind the eye. The belly is yellowish while, uniformly colored or with scattered small grayish brown spots. Juvenile specimens are commonly a glossy black or gray.

== Geographic range ==
The snouted night adder is found in Tanzania and the Democratic Republic of the Congo southward through Malawi, Zambia, Mozambique, and Zimbabwe to South Africa and Eswatini.

The type locality was originally listed as "Buenos Ayres", obviously a mistake. It was restricted by Broadley (1971) to Africa, Puku.

== Habitat ==
C. defilippii occurs in moist and dry savanna, coastal thickets, and forests from sea level to around 1,800 m (5,900 ft) altitude. It favors moist surroundings, but has also been found in dry areas on rocky hillsides and escarpments.

== Behavior ==
The snouted night adder is generally nocturnal, but not entirely. It is mostly terrestrial, but sometimes climbs into low vegetation in pursuit of frogs, and is also a good swimmer. When not basking, it remains hidden in ground cover, brush piles, and in holes. If disturbed, it inflates itself and hisses. It is slow-moving for the most part, but can strike quickly. In captivity, however, it soon becomes tame and unwilling to strike.

== Venom ==
Little is known about the venom of C. defilippii, but the symptoms described in the few existing case histories include rapid swelling, fever, sometimes intense pain, and occasionally lymphadenopathy. The swelling usually subsided after 2–3 days, and there have not been any reports of necrosis. Currently, there is no antivenin that provides protection against bites from this species.

== Diet ==
C. defilippii preys predominately upon small amphibians.

== Reproduction ==
C. defilippii is oviparous. Clutch size is six to eight eggs, each of which measures 23 x 15 mm (.91 x .59 inches). Each hatchling has a total length (including tail) of around 100 mm (3.9 in).
