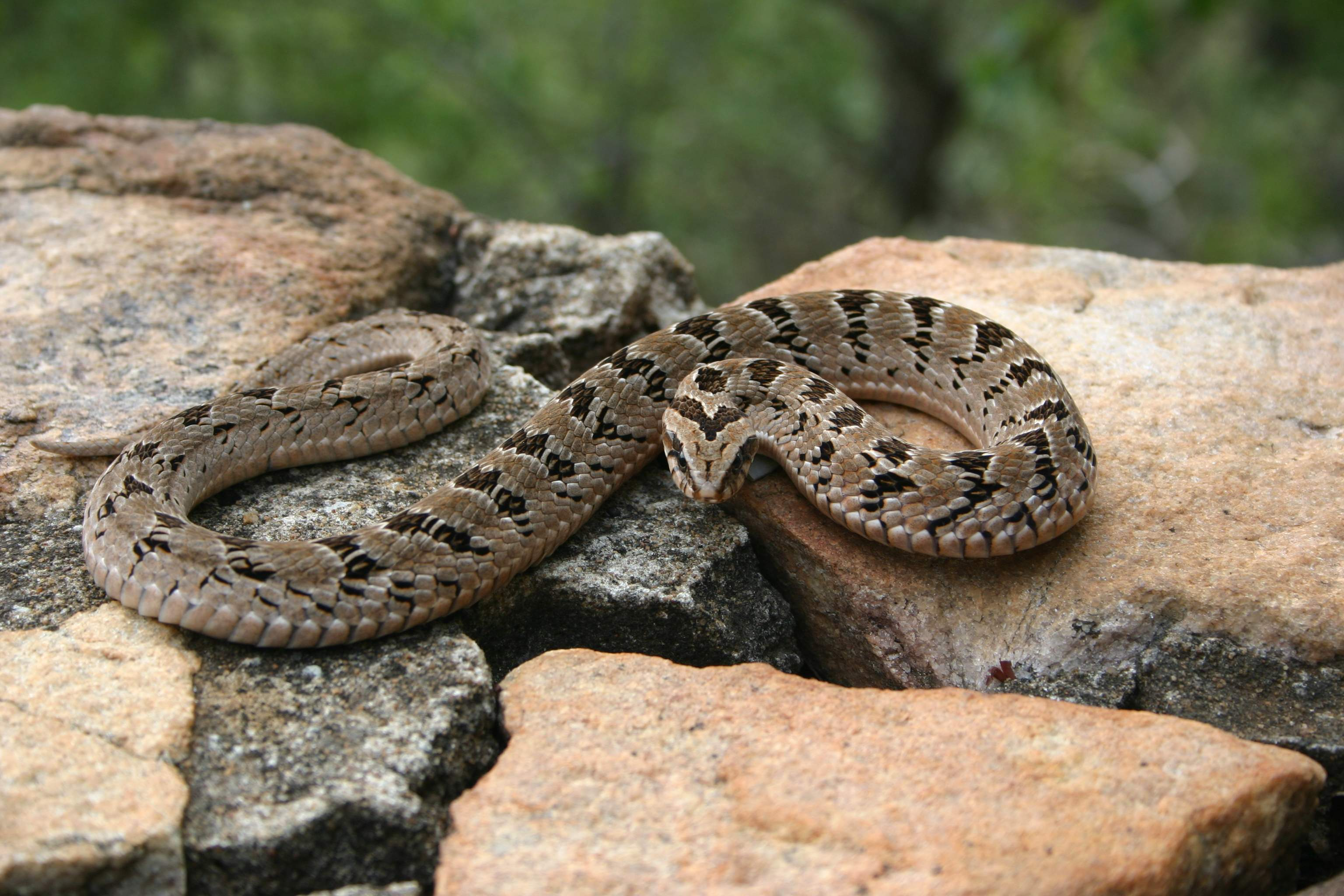
- Common night adder, C. rhombeatus

Scientific classification
- Kingdom: Animalia
- Phylum: Chordata
- Class: Reptilia
- Order: Squamata
- Suborder: Serpentes
- Family: Viperidae
- Subfamily: Viperinae
- Genus: Causus; Wagler, 1830

Species
- Causus bilineatus Boulenger, 1905; Causus defilippii (Jan, 1863); Causus lichtensteinii (Jan, 1859); Causus maculatus (Hallowell, 1842); Causus rasmusseni Broadley, 2014; Causus resimus (W. Peters, 1862); Causus rhombeatus (Lichtenstein, 1823)

Synonyms
- Causus Wagler, 1830; Distichurus Hallowell, 1842; Heterophis W. Peters, 1862; Dinodipsas W. Peters, 1882

= Causus =

Genus of snakes

Causus is a genus of vipers found only in sub-Saharan Africa. It is a group considered to be among the most primitive members of the family Viperidae based on head scalation, oviparity, venom apparatus, and because they have round pupils. However, this is contradicted by recent molecular studies. Seven species are currently recognized as being valid. They are commonly known as night adders. Like all other vipers, they are venomous.

== Description ==
Snakes of the genus Causus are fairly stout, never growing to more than 1 m (3.3 ft) in total length.

As opposed to most vipers, in which the head is distinct from the neck and covered with small scales, in Causus the head is only slightly distinct from the neck and covered with nine large, symmetrical head shields. Also, the eyes have round pupils instead of elliptical ones like other vipers. The rostral scale is broad, sometimes pointed or upturned. The nostril is located between two nasals and an internasal. The frontal and supraocular scales are long. A loreal scale is present, separating the nasal and preoculars. The suboculars are separated from the supralabials. The mandible has splenial and angular elements.

The fangs are different, too. Unlike other vipers, no hinge action occurs where the prefrontal bone engages the frontal. However, since the maxillary bones rotate almost as far, the fangs can still be erected. The fangs themselves are relatively short. A fine line, or suture, is also present along the length of the fang, representing the vestigial edge where the groove lips meet (from incomplete fang canal closure).

The body is cylindrical or slightly depressed and moderately slender. The dorsal scales are smooth or weakly keeled with apical pits. The ventral scales are rounded, and the anal plate is single (undivided). The tail is short, and the subcaudals can be either single or paired.

Among the viperids, another unique characteristic of this genus is that several species have venom glands that are not confined to the temporal area as with most vipers, but are exceptionally long and extend well down the neck. These venom glands, located on either side of the spine, may have a length of up to 10 cm (3.9 in), with long ducts connecting them to the fangs.

Other internal differences also set the Causinae apart: they have unusually long kidneys, a well-developed tracheal lung with two tracheal arteries, and the liver overlaps the tip of the heart.

== Geographic range ==
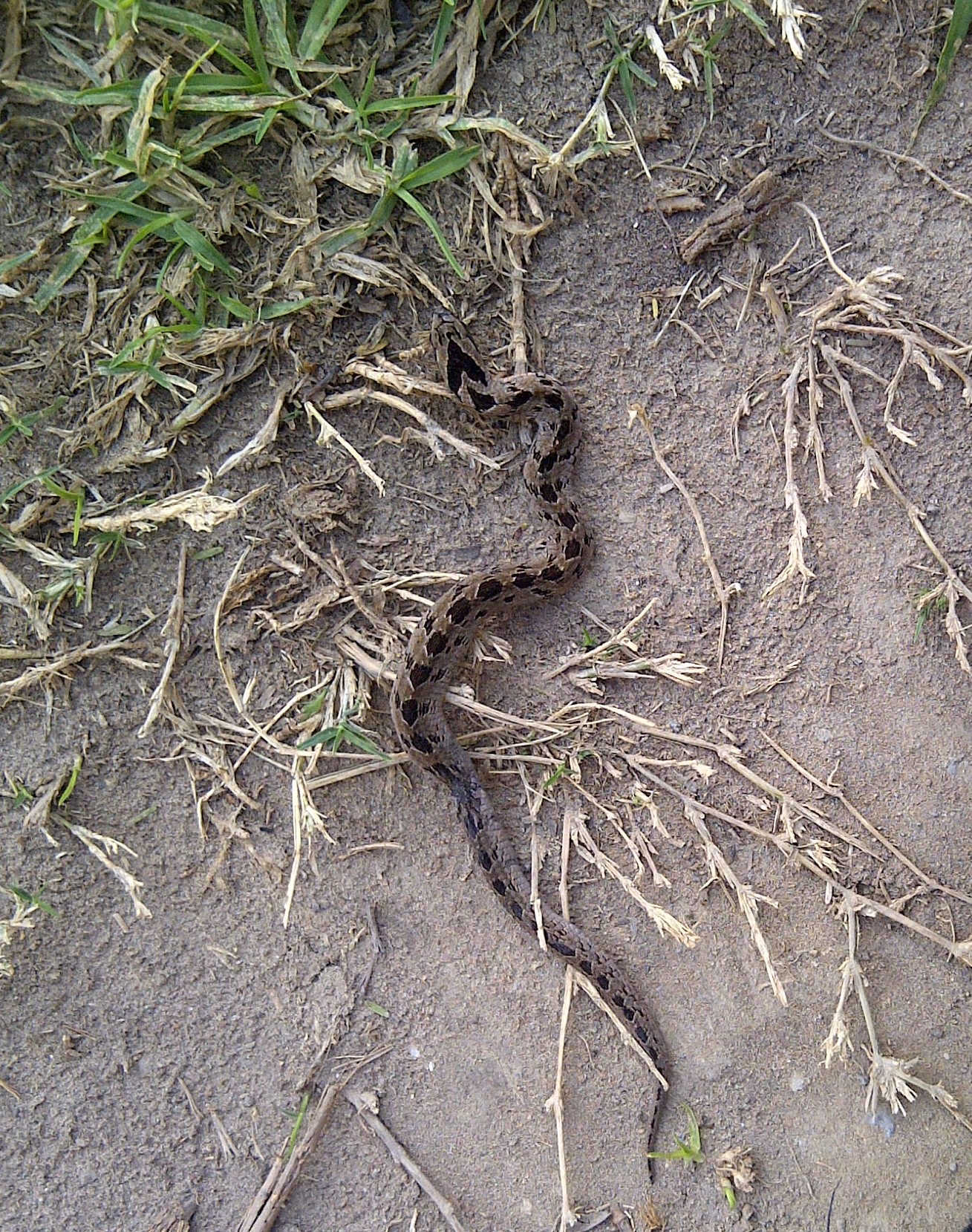
A young night adder, photographed in Kei Mouth, South Africa

The Causinae are found in sub-Saharan Africa.

== Behavior ==
Despite their common names, species of the genus Causus are active during the day, as well as at night. When disturbed, they will engage in a ferocious hissing and puffing threat display. They may lift the anterior part of the body off the ground in a coil and make a powerful swiping strike; juveniles have been known to come off the ground. Others specimens may raise the anterior part of the body off the ground, flattening the neck and moving forward, tongue extended, like a small cobra. The rather frantic strikes are often combined with attempts to quickly glide away.

== Feeding ==
The diet of Causus species consists almost exclusively of toads and frogs. Gluttony has been reported; when prey is abundant, they may eat until they are literally unable to swallow any more food.

== Reproduction ==
All Causus species lay eggs (oviparity), which among vipers is considered to be a more primitive trait, though not unique. The average clutch consists of some two dozen eggs that require an incubation period of about four months. Hatchlings are 10–12.5 cm (4–5 in) in total length (body + tail).

== Venom ==
In spite of their enormously developed venom glands, night adders do not always use them to subdue their prey. The venom would act fast enough, but often they simply seize and swallow their prey, instead.

Causus venom is weaker than that of the puff adder (Bitis arietans). Envenomation normally causes only local pain and swelling. Antivenin treatment should not be necessary. Nevertheless, South African polyvalent serum is known to be effective against the venom of at least two species of the genus Causus. However, envenomation can be very serious and in at least one case a bitten child had to have a fasciotomy. A number of small dogs have had limbs amputated or died due to bites from these snakes. The danger from these snakes should not be underestimated as a bite from a large individual on a small child could potentially be fatal.

No recent deaths have been reported due to these species. Earlier reports of fatalities were based on anecdotal evidence; the species involved likely were not properly identified or the cases were grossly mismanaged.

== Species ==
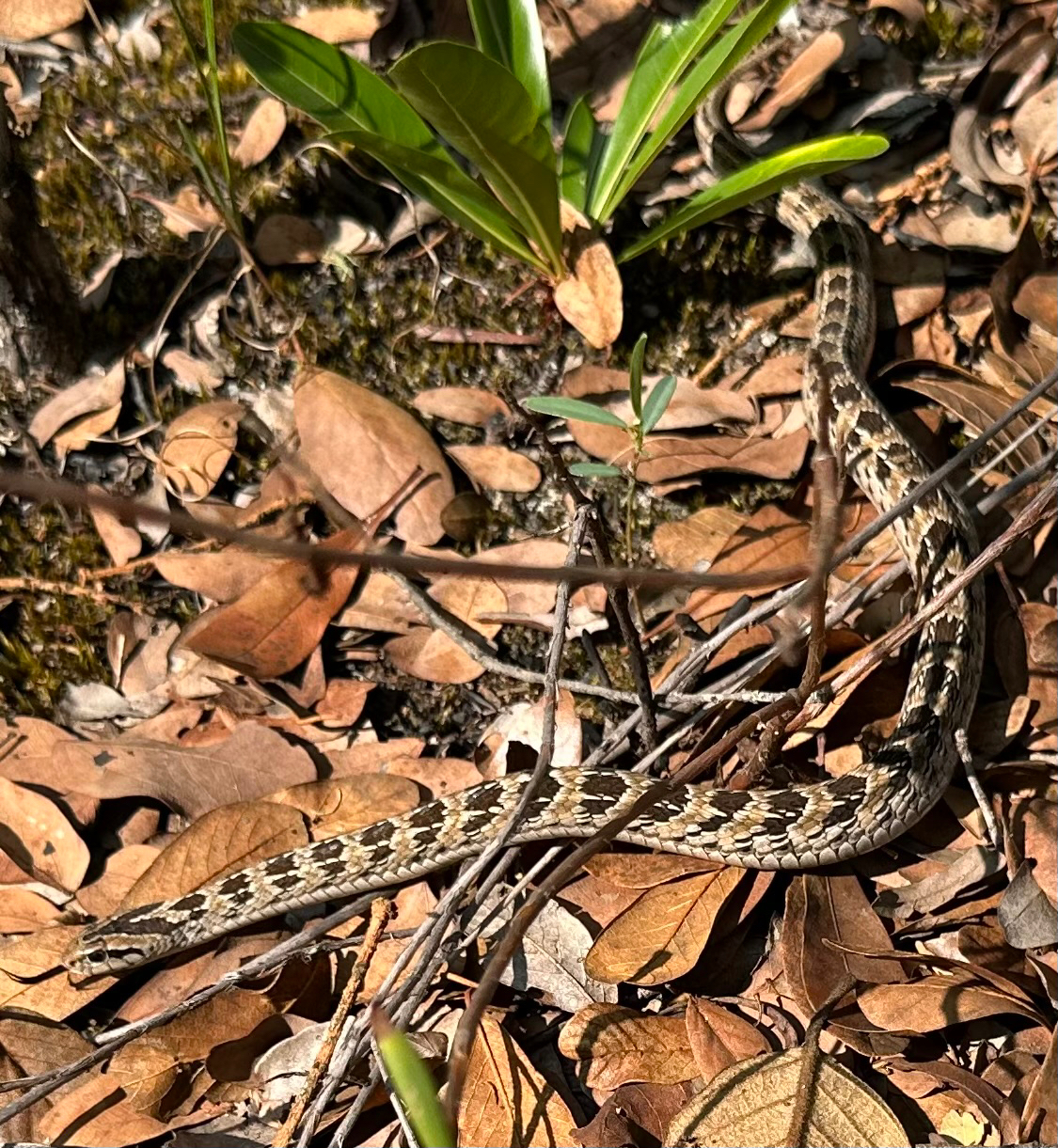
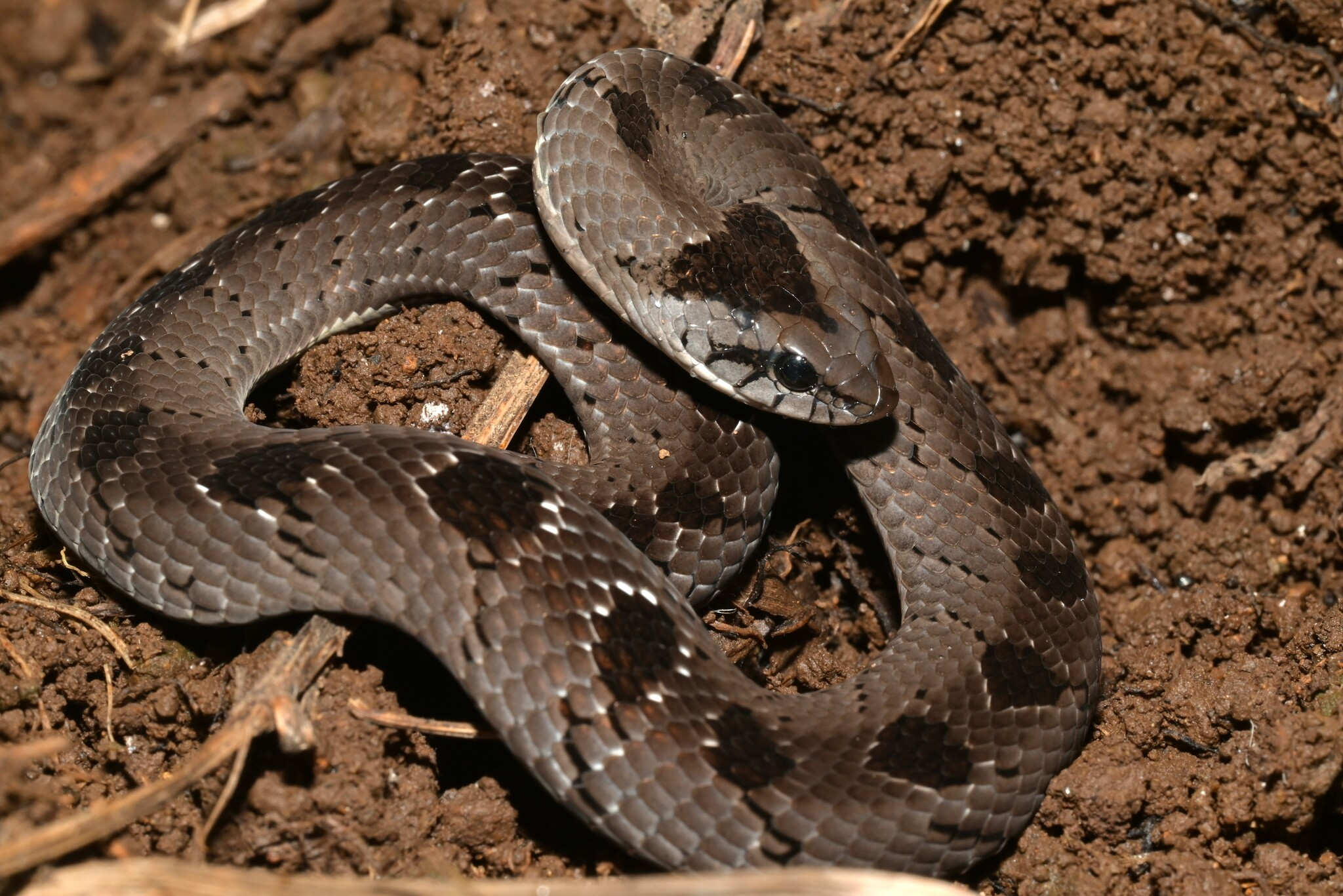
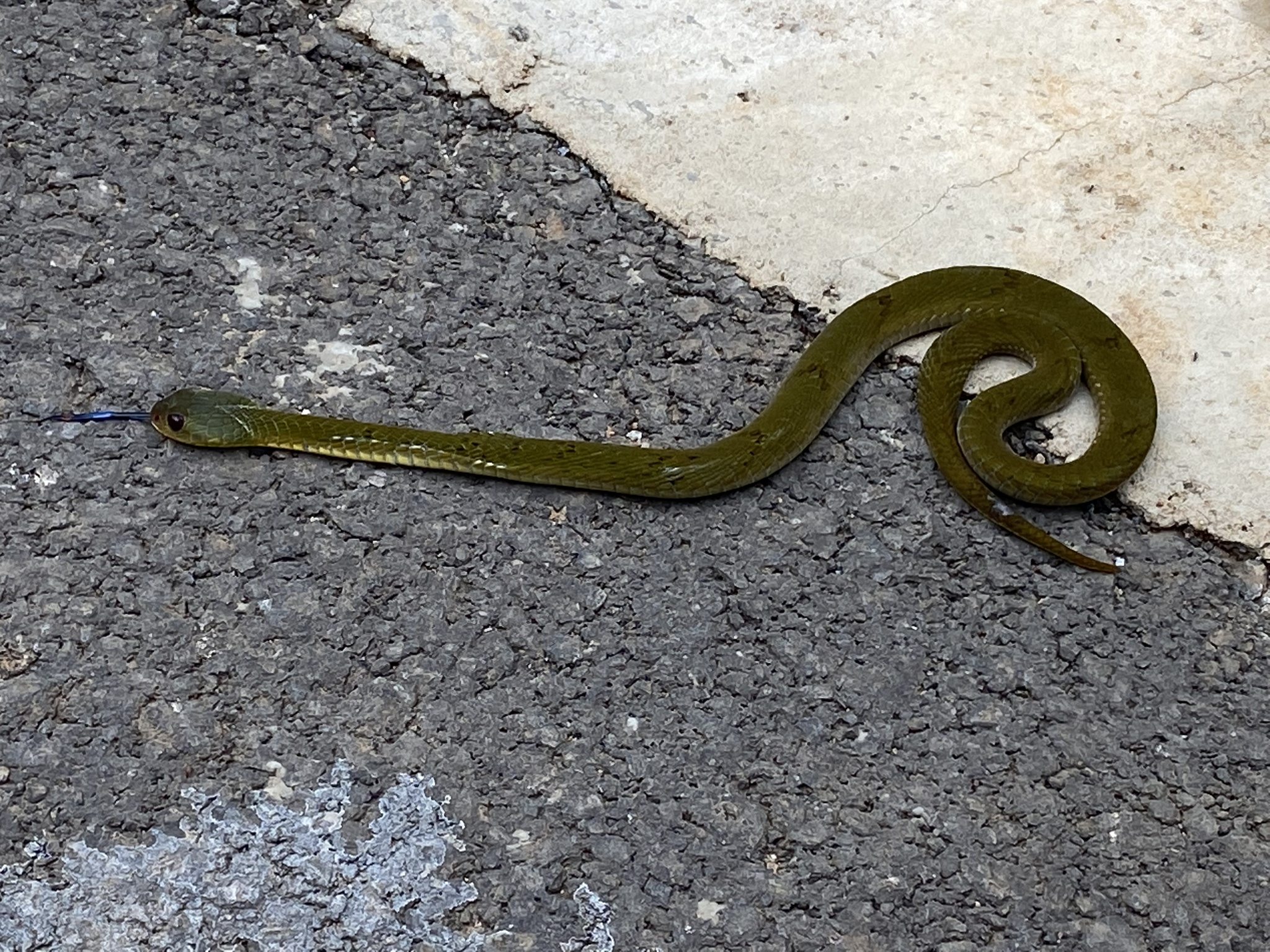
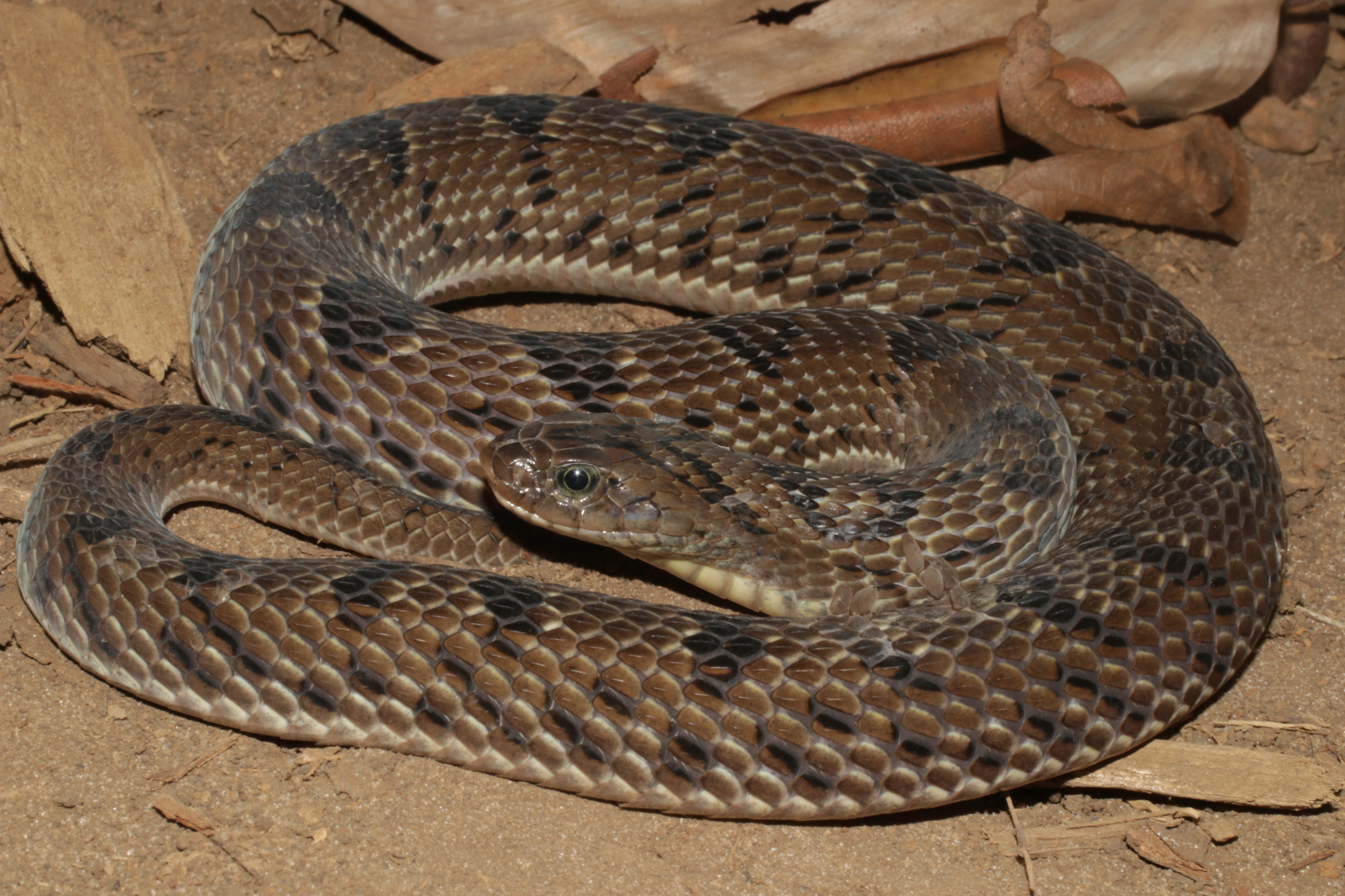
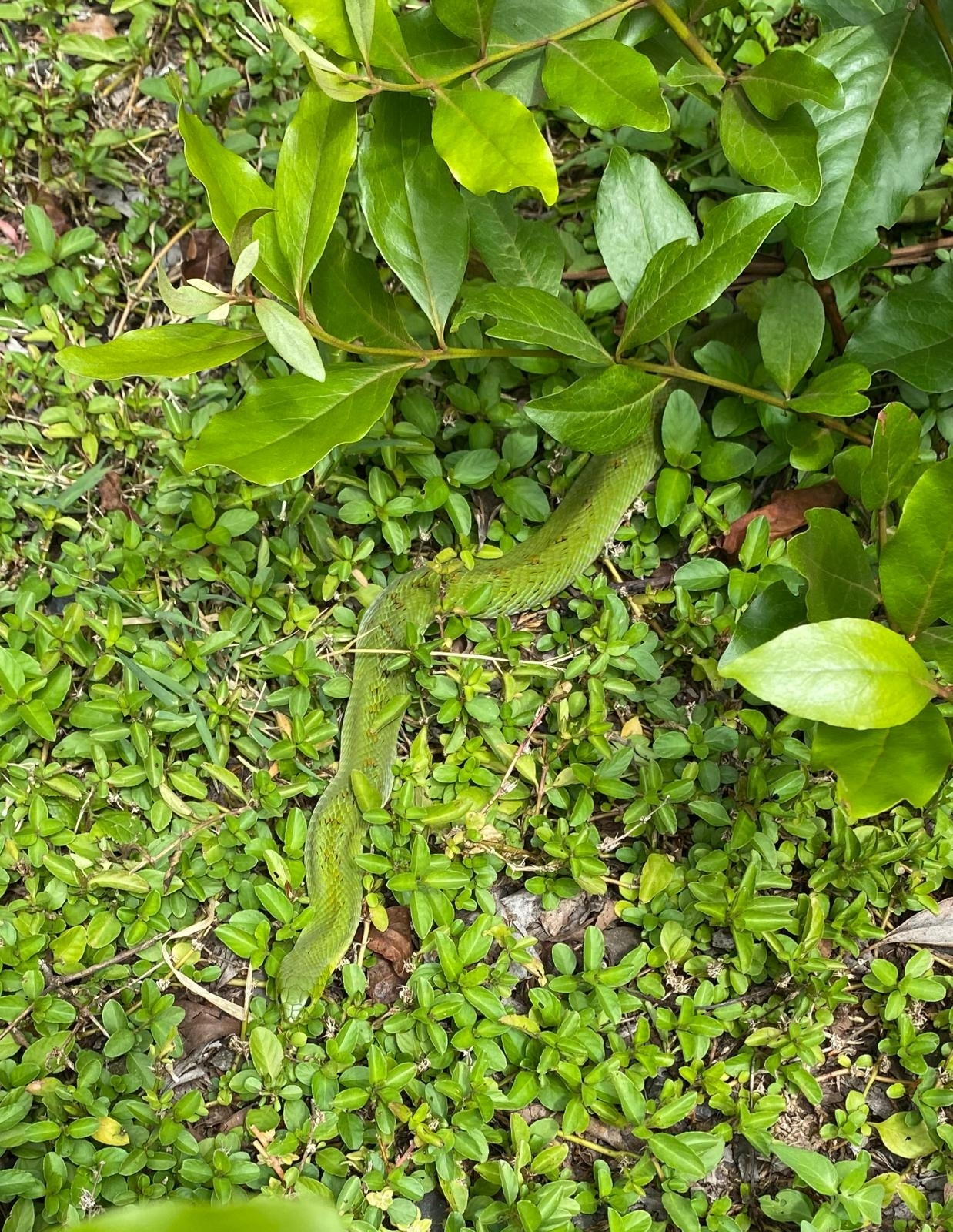
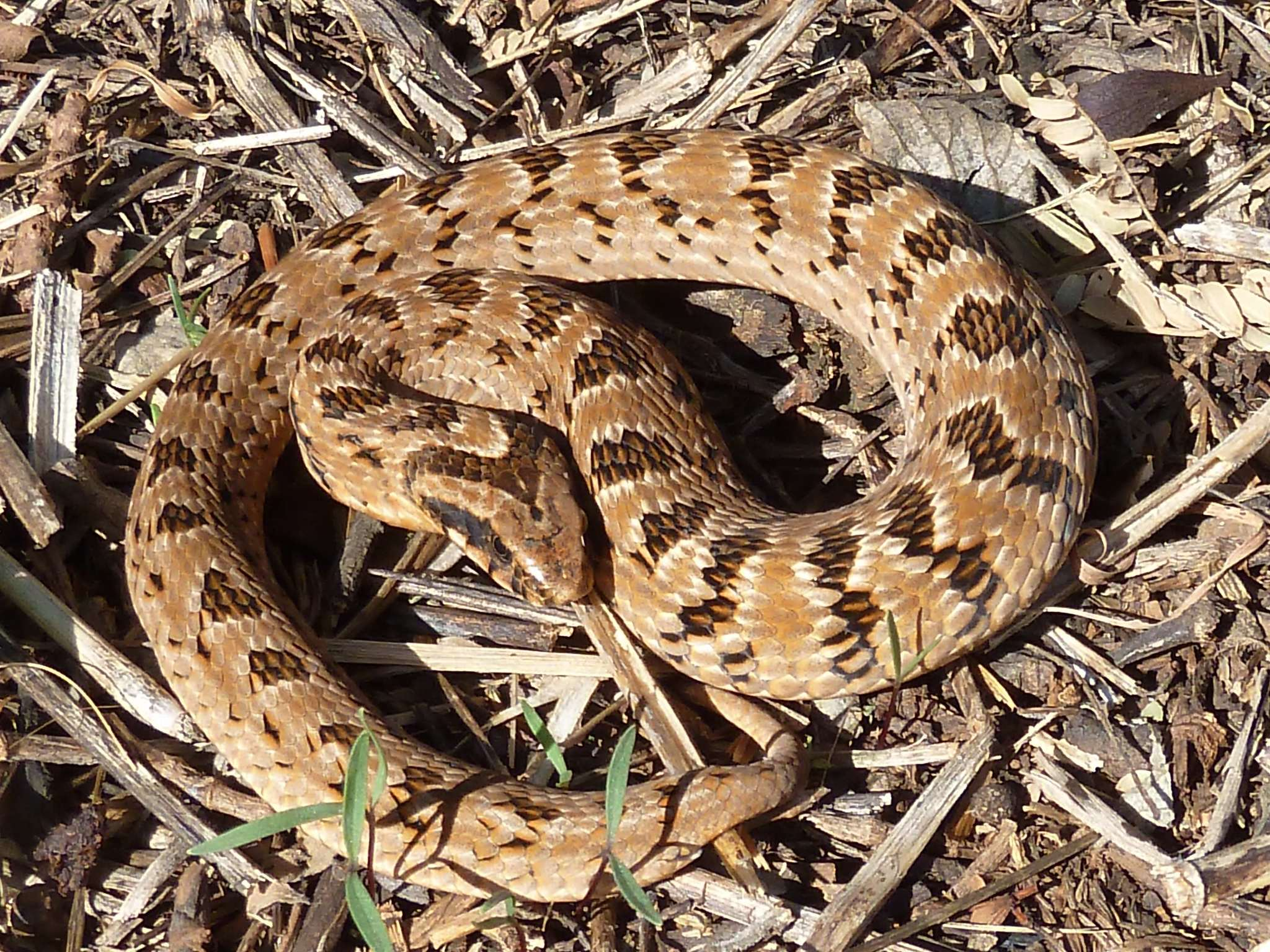
Species	Taxon author	Common name	Geographic range	Image
Causus bilineatus	Boulenger, 1905	two-striped night adder	Africa in Angola, Zambia, and southern DR Congo
Causus defilippii	(Jan, 1863)	snouted night adder	Southeast Africa
Causus lichtensteinii	(Jan, 1859)	Lichtenstein's night adder	Equatorial Africa from Zambia and Cameroon to the Ivory Coast
Causus maculatus	(Hallowell, 1842)	West African night adder	Most of sub-Saharan Africa north of the equator
Causus rasmusseni	Broadley, 2014	Angolan night adder	Zambia and Angola
Causus resimus	(W. Peters, 1862)	green night adder	Most of equatorial Africa
Causus rhombeatus^{T}	(Lichtenstein, 1823)	common night adder	Sub-Saharan Africa

^{T}) Type species.

== Taxonomy ==
A long-standing tendency among herpetologists was to make assumptions regarding the phylogenetic position of this group. McDiarmid et al. suggested the consensus among the experts in 1999 was that Causus was basal to all viperids, so deserved a separate subfamily. However, two more recent molecular phylogenetic studies have shown Causus is not only not basal to all viperids, but in fact appears to be nested within the viperines. Consequently, recognition of the subfamily Causinae is inappropriate.
