= Green viper =

Green viper may refer to:

- Atheris nitschei, a.k.a. Great Lakes bush viper, a venomous viper species found in Africa from Uganda and adjacent DR Congo in the north to northern Malawi in the south
- Causus resimus, a.k.a. the green night adder, a venomous viper species found in isolated populations distributed across tropical Africa
- Trimeresurus stejnegeri, a.k.a. the Chinese green viper
