= Sublabial =

Sublabial may refer to:

- Sublabial scales on reptiles
- Sublabial route of administration of drugs
