= Aspidomorphus lineaticollis =

Conservation status
- Least Concern (IUCN 3.1)

Scientific classification
- Kingdom: Animalia
- Phylum: Chordata
- Class: Reptilia
- Order: Squamata
- Suborder: Serpentes
- Family: Elapidae
- Genus: Aspidomorphus
- Species: A. lineaticollis

Binomial name
- Aspidomorphus lineaticollis (Werner, 1903)

Species of snake

Aspidomorphus lineaticollis, the striped crown snake , is a species of snake of the family Elapidae.

The snake is found in Papua New Guinea.
