= Aspidomorphus =

Scientific classification
- Kingdom: Animalia
- Phylum: Chordata
- Class: Reptilia
- Order: Squamata
- Suborder: Serpentes
- Family: Elapidae
- Subfamily: Hydrophiinae
- Genus: Aspidomorphus; Fitzinger, 1843

Genus of snakes

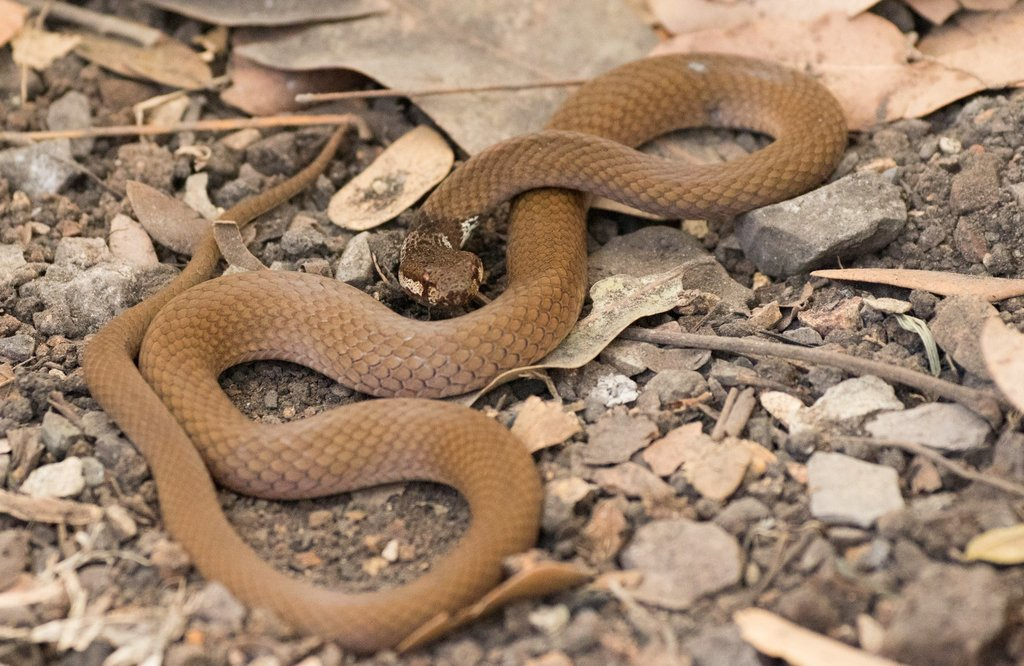
Millers crown snake

Aspidomorphus is a genus of venomous elapid snakes endemic to New Guinea and neighbouring islands. They are commonly called collared adders or crown snakes. These are small snakes with rounded snouts and small eyes. Very little is known about these nocturnal burrowing species.

== Species ==
Species	Authority	Subsp.	Common name	Geographic range
A. lineaticollis	(F. Werner, 1903)	None	Striped crown snake	Papua New Guinea (Trobriand I, Louisiade Archipelago, d'Entrecasteaux Archipelago)
A. muelleri	(Schlegel, 1837)	4	Müller's crown snake	Indonesia (Irian Jaya), Papua New Guinea (Bismarck Archipelago)
A. schlegelii	(Günther, 1872)	None	Schlegel's crown snake	Indonesia (Irian Jaya), Papua New Guinea
