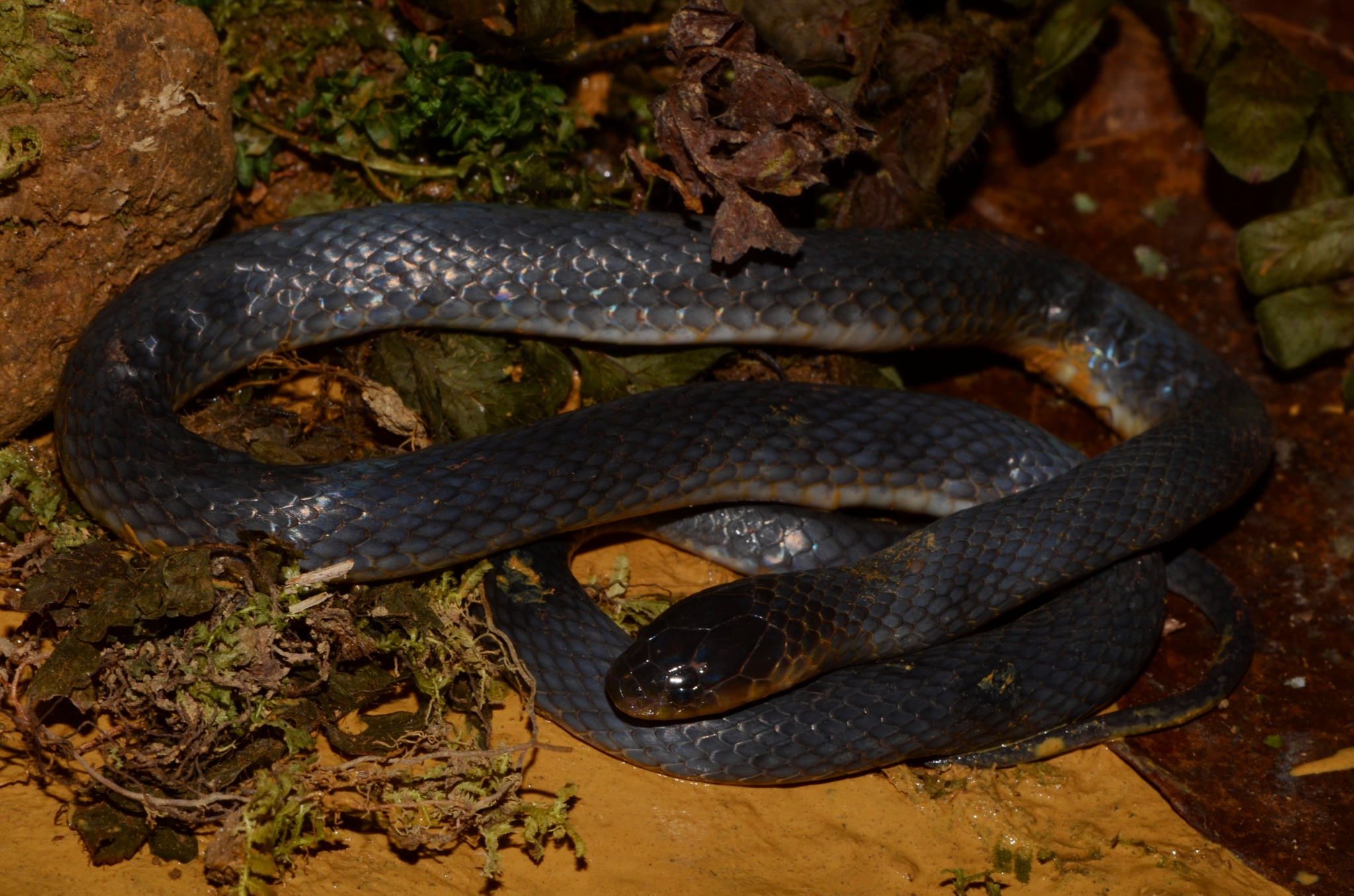
- Aparallactus modestus

Scientific classification
- Kingdom: Animalia
- Phylum: Chordata
- Class: Reptilia
- Order: Squamata
- Suborder: Serpentes
- Family: Atractaspididae
- Subfamily: Aparallactinae
- Genus: Aparallactus; A. Smith, 1849

= Aparallactus =

Genus of snakes

Common name: centipede eaters.

Aparallactus is a genus of rear-fanged mildly venomous snakes in the family Atractaspididae. The genus is endemic to Africa. 11 species are recognized as being valid.

== Description ==
Species in the genus Aparallactus have a short maxilla, with 6-9 small teeth followed by a large grooved fang situated below the eye. The anterior mandibular teeth are the longest. The head is small, not distinct from the neck. The eye is small, with a round pupil. The nasal is entire or divided. There is no loreal scale. The body is cylindrical. The tail is moderate or short. The dorsal scales are smooth, without pits, and are arranged in 15 rows. The ventrals are rounded. The subcaudals are single (not divided nor paired).

== Snakebite and medical relevance ==
Although members of the genus produce venom, they appear to be relatively harmless, given their small size (usually < 60 cm) and burrowing lifestyle. Spawls & Branch do not list them as "dangerous". As of 2026, Pubmed does not list any publications listing any snakebite resulting from this genus.

== Species ==
Genus Aparallactus -- 11 species
Species	Taxon author	Subspecies*	Common name	Geographic range
A. capensis^{T}	A. Smith, 1849	bocagei luebberti punctatolineatus	Cape centipede-eater	Republic of South Africa, Eswatini, Botswana, Zimbabwe, Mozambique, Democratic Republic of the Congo.
A. guentheri	Boulenger, 1895	————	black centipede-eater	Zimbabwe, Zambia, Malawi, Kenya, Angola, Mozambique, Tanzania, Zanzibar.
A. jacksonii	(Günther, 1888)	————	Jackson's centipede-eater	Ethiopia, north Tanzania, south Sudan, Kenya, Somalia, Uganda.
A. lineatus	(W. Peters, 1870)	————	lined centipede-eater	Guinea, Liberia, Ghana, Cameroon.
A. lunulatus	(W. Peters, 1854)	nigrocollaris scortecci	reticulated centipede-eater	Zimbabwe, Mozambique, Republic of South Africa, Eswatini, Zambia, Democratic Republic of the Congo, Ghana to Eritrea, Ivory Coast, Ethiopia, Somalia, Central African Republic, Cameroon, Botswana, Tanzania.
A. modestus	(Günther, 1859)	ubangensis	western forest centipede-eater	Central African Republic, Uganda, Democratic Republic of the Congo, Cameroon, Nigeria, Togo, Benin, Ghana, Ivory Coast, Liberia, Sierra Leone, Cameroon, Gabon.
A. moeruensis	de Witte & Laurent, 1943	————	Zaire centipede-eater	South Democratic Republic of the Congo.
A. niger	Boulenger, 1897	————		Guinea, Sierra Leone, Liberia, Ivory Coast.
A. nigriceps	(W. Peters, 1854)	————	Mozambique centipede-eater	South eastern Mozambique around Inhambane.
A. turneri	Loveridge, 1935	————	Malindi centipede-eater	Coastal Kenya.
A. werneri	Boulenger, 1895	————	Usambara centipede-eater	Eastern Tanzania, Usambara and Uluguru Mountains.

*) Not including the nominate subspecies. ^{T}) Type species.

== See also ==
- Snakebite.
