= Aparallactus niger =

Scientific classification
- Kingdom: Animalia
- Phylum: Chordata
- Class: Reptilia
- Order: Squamata
- Suborder: Serpentes
- Family: Atractaspididae
- Genus: Aparallactus
- Species: A. niger

Binomial name
- Aparallactus niger Boulenger, 1897

Species of snake

Aparallactus niger is a species of mildly venomous rear-fanged snake in the family Atractaspididae. It is endemic to Western Africa.

== Geographic range ==
It is found in Guinea, Sierra Leone, Liberia, and Ivory Coast.

== Description ==
Aparallactus niger is completely black dorsally, to which the specific name, niger, refers. Ventrally, the ventral scales are white, edged with black, and the subcaudal scales are black in the middle and on the posterior and outer borders.

The type specimen is 33.5 cm (13 1/4 in) in total length, 8 cm (3 1/8 in) of which is the tail.

The dorsal scales are arranged in 15 rows. Ventrals 164; anal plate entire; subcaudals 60.

Portion of rostral visible from above 1/3 as long as its distance from the frontal. Internasals slightly broader than long, widely separated from the preocular. A single prefrontal, forming sutures with the nasal and the preocular. Frontal nearly 1 1/2 times as long as broad, as long as its distance from the end of the snout, much shorter than the parietals. Nasal semidivided, in contact with the preocular. Two postoculars. A single temporal. Seven upper labials, third and fourth entering the eye, fifth and sixth in contact with the parietal. First lower labial in contact with its fellow behind the mental. Four lower labials in contact with anterior chin shield. Anterior chin shields longer than posterior chin shields.
