= Aparallactus moeruensis =

Scientific classification
- Kingdom: Animalia
- Phylum: Chordata
- Class: Reptilia
- Order: Squamata
- Suborder: Serpentes
- Family: Atractaspididae
- Genus: Aparallactus
- Species: A. moeruensis

Binomial name
- Aparallactus moeruensis de Witte & Laurent, 1943

Species of snake

Aparallactus moeruensis, or the Zaire centipede-eater, is a species of mildly venomous rear-fanged snake in the family Atractaspididae. It is found in the southern Democratic Republic of the Congo (formerly known as Zaire).
