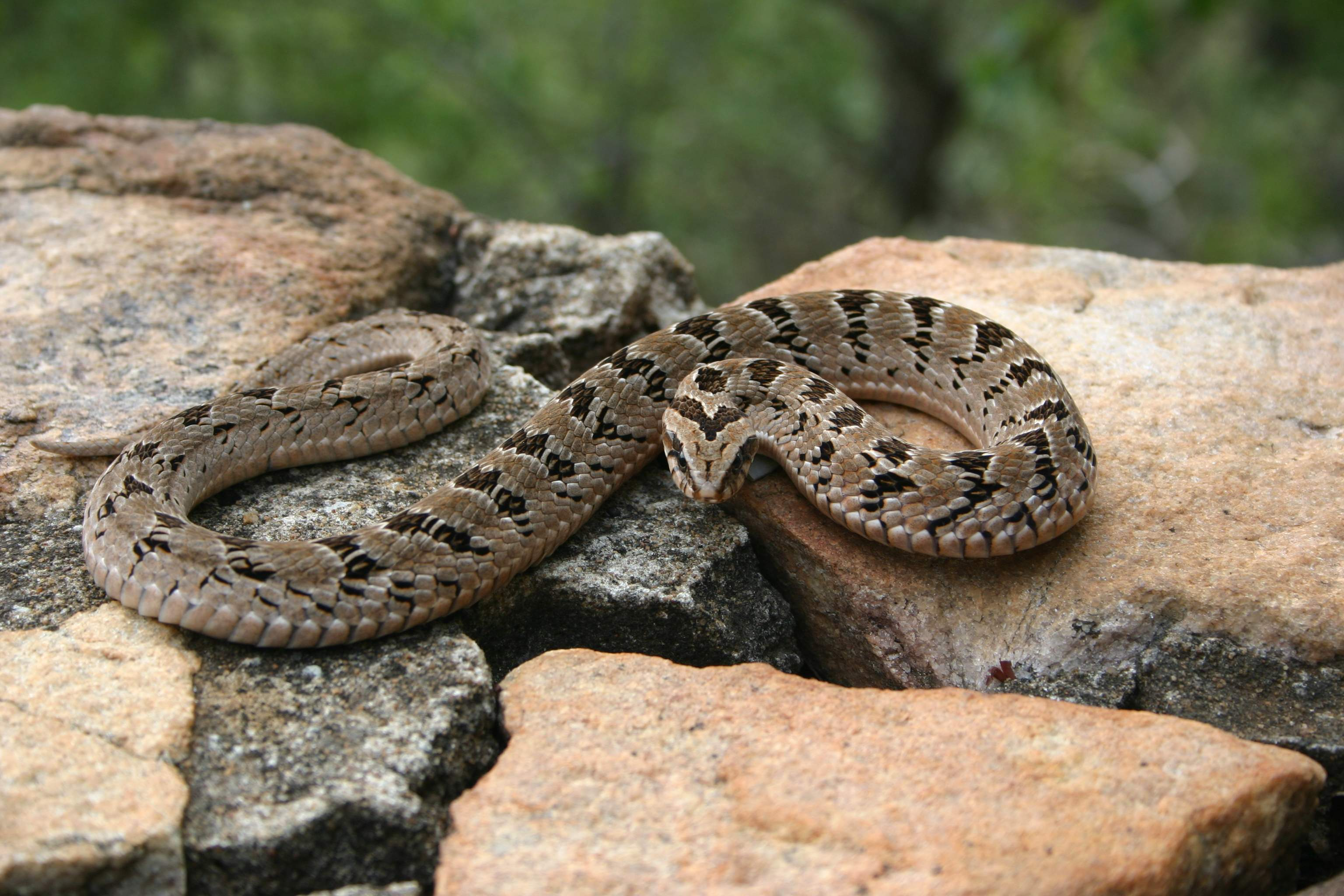

Conservation status
- Least Concern (IUCN 3.1)

Scientific classification
- Kingdom: Animalia
- Phylum: Chordata
- Class: Reptilia
- Order: Squamata
- Suborder: Serpentes
- Family: Viperidae
- Genus: Causus
- Species: C. rhombeatus

Binomial name
- Causus rhombeatus (Lichtenstein, 1823)

Synonyms
- List: Sepedon rhombeata Lichtenstein, 1823; Coluber v nigrum F. Boie, 1827; Coluber V. nigrum Cuvier, 1829; Causus rhombeatus Wagler, 1830; Naja rhombeatus Schlegel, 1837; Aspedilaps rhombeatus Jan, 1859; Aspedilaps (Causus) rhombeatus Jan, 1863; Causus rhombeatus Boulenger, 1896; Causus rhombeatus var. taeniata Sternfeld, 1912; Causus rhombeatus rhombeatus Laurent, 1956; Causus rhombeatus FitzSimons, 1962; Sepedon rhombeatus Elter, 1981; Causus rhombeatus Golay et al., 1993

= Causus rhombeatus =

Rhombic night adder

Species of snake

Causus rhombeatus, commonly known as the rhombic night adder, is a species of venomous snake in the subfamily Viperinae of the family Viperidae. The species is native to Sub-Saharan Africa. No subspecies are recognized as being valid.

== Description ==
With an average total length (tail included) of 60 cm (24 in), C. rhombeatus is the largest member of the genus Causus. The longest individual ever recorded was a male, 93 cm (37 in) in total length, collected in eastern Zimbabwe.

The head has a snout that is relatively blunt (i.e., more rounded than in other members of this genus), on the sides of which the nostrils are positioned. The circumorbital ring consists of 2–3 preoculars, 1–2 postoculars, and 1–2 suboculars that separate the eye from the supralabials. The temporal scales usually number 2+3, sometimes 2+4, but very rarely 2+2 or 3+3. There are 6 supralabial scales, very rarely 7. The sublabial scales usually number 7 or 10, rarely 8, and very rarely 11, 12 or 13. The first 3–4 sublabials are in contact with the anterior chin shields. The posterior chin shields are small and often indistinguishable from the gulars.

At midbody there are 15–21 rows of dorsal scales that are moderately keeled and have a satiny texture. The ventral scales number 120–166, the subcaudals, most of which are divided, 15–36.

The color pattern consists of a ground color that is usually some shade of brown (possibly pinkish or grayish-brown), but occasionally olive green. This is overlaid with a pattern of 20–30 rhombic blotches that have pale edges, as well as a sprinkling of black scales and oblique black bars on the sides. Each oblique black bar is topped by one or two black spots, each with a pale centre, and strongly resembling an eye. Northern populations may be patternless, making them difficult to identify, while in others the pale edges may be missing, the rhombic blotches may be a darker color, or there may even be a dark brown vertebral stripe. The head has a characteristic V-shaped mark that may be solid black, or brown with a black outline. Compare this with the description of the common egg-eater Dasypeltis scabra, a species that has a colour pattern and behaviour that may be an evolutionary strategy for defensive mimicry.

== Common names ==
Common names for C. rhombeatus include rhombic night adder, demon night adder, Cape night adder, African night adder, and Cape viper.

== Geographic range ==
C. rhombeatus is found in Sub-Saharan Africa from Nigeria east to Sudan, Ethiopia, Somalia and Kenya, south through Tanzania, Uganda, Rwanda, Burundi, DR Congo, Angola, Zambia, Malawi, Zimbabwe, northern Botswana, Mozambique, Eswatini, and eastern South Africa to Riverdale in the Western Cape Province. No type locality is listed.

== Habitat ==
The preferred natural habitats of C. rhombeatus are forest, savanna, shrubland, and grassland, at altitudes of 600–2,200 m (2,000–7,200 ft).

== Behavior ==
C. rhombeatus is an active species that can often move relatively quickly, up to an estimated speed of 92 cm per second (3 feet per second). It is usually found on the ground, but has no trouble climbing or swimming. It is largely nocturnal, but is often seen basking in the early morning or late afternoon. However, Mallow et al. (2003) reported collecting a dozen specimens that were all active during the heat of the day.

Most specimens are docile, seldom attempting to bite unless severely provoked. FitzSimons is quoted in Pitman (1938) as saying that, in captivity, some specimens "become so tame that you may allow them to creep, climb and slither round your neck and inside your garments." Others, however, are more temperamental.

When seriously disturbed, it will put on a "ferocious" threat display that includes coiling up, inflating the body (making the dark markings stand out), hissing and puffing loudly, flattening the anterior portion of the body, and striking frantically. It may also flatten the neck and move forward with the tongue extended, much like a small cobra. Striking is done with such vigor that small specimens may lift themselves off the ground entirely.

== Feeding ==
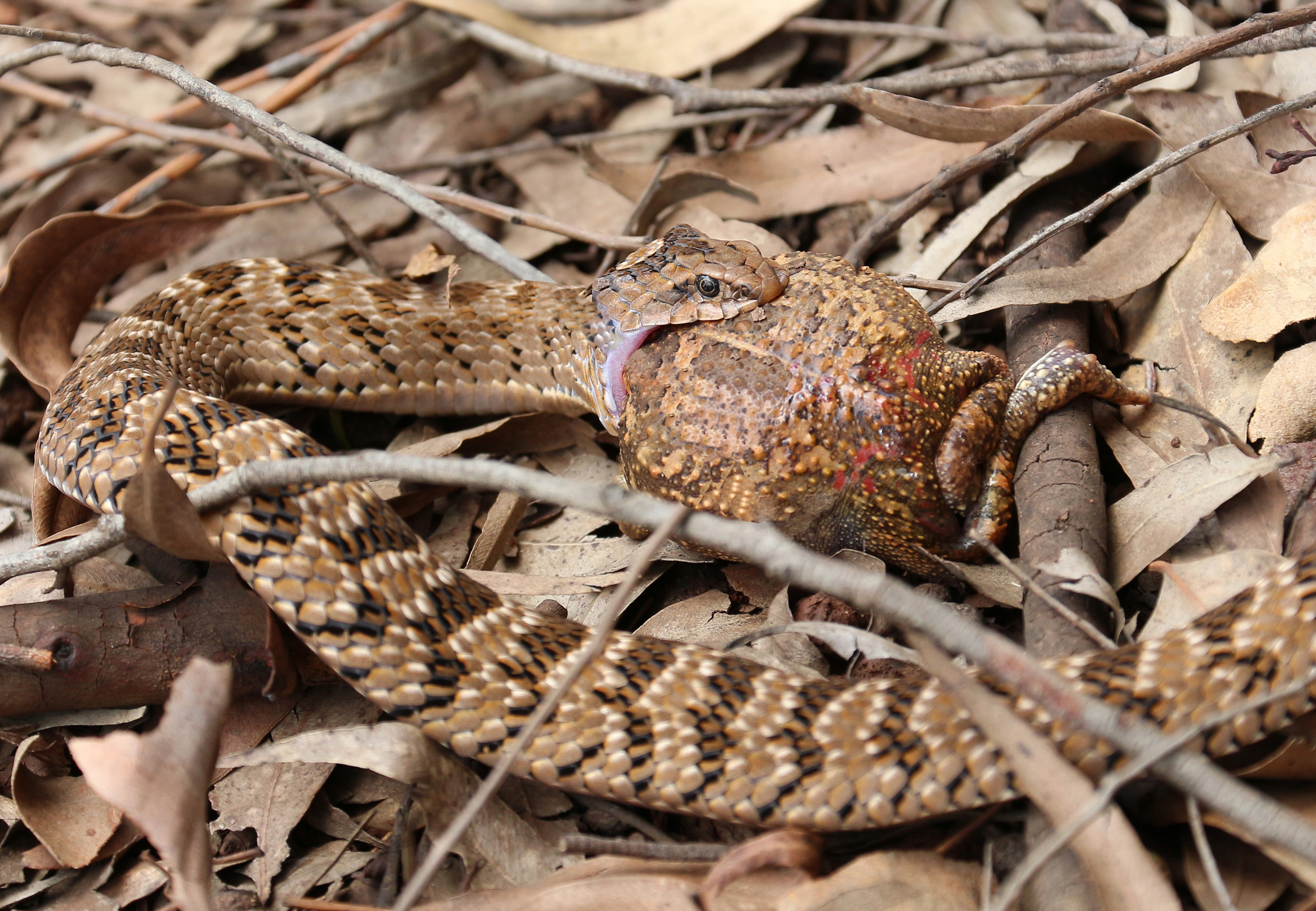
A rhombic night adder eating a toad in Mlilwane Wildlife Sanctuary, Eswatini

The diet of C. rhombeatus consists mainly of toads, but it also includes frogs and small mammals.

== Reproduction ==
Females of C. rhombeatus produce an average clutch of 24 eggs that require a lengthy incubation period of approximately four months. The hatchlings are 10–12.5 cm (3.9–4.9 in) in total length (tail included) and feed on tiny frogs and toads.

== Venom ==
Rhombic night adder bites can be serious, and in at least one bite a child had to have a fasciotomy. The few documented bites involved pain and minor swelling with minimal necrosis. These symptoms usually disappear within 2–3 days. There have been no modern well-documented cases to back up earlier claims of fatalities due to bites from this species. Venom yield has varied from 20 to 30 mg to 300 mg, but the venom toxicity is low with LD_{50} values of 10.8, 14.6, >16.0 mg/kg IV and 15 mg/kg SC being reported.
