= Aparallactus turneri =

Conservation status
- Least Concern (IUCN 3.1)

Scientific classification
- Kingdom: Animalia
- Phylum: Chordata
- Class: Reptilia
- Order: Squamata
- Suborder: Serpentes
- Family: Atractaspididae
- Genus: Aparallactus
- Species: A. turneri

Binomial name
- Aparallactus turneri Loveridge, 1935

Species of snake

Aparallactus turneri, or the Malindi centipede-eater, is a species of mildly venomous rear-fanged snake in the family Atractaspididae. The species is endemic to Kenya.

== Etymology ==
The specific name, turneri, is in honor of British taxidermist H.J. Allen Turner (1876–1953), who lived in Kenya.

== Geographic range ==
A. turneri is found in coastal Kenya.

== Habitat ==
The preferred natural habitats of A. turneri are forest and shrubland, at altitudes from sea level to 400 m (1,300 ft).

== Reproduction ==
A. turneri is oviparous.
