= Causus bilineatus =

Conservation status
- Least Concern (IUCN 3.1)

Scientific classification
- Kingdom: Animalia
- Phylum: Chordata
- Class: Reptilia
- Order: Squamata
- Suborder: Serpentes
- Family: Viperidae
- Genus: Causus
- Species: C. bilineatus

Binomial name
- Causus bilineatus Boulenger, 1905

Synonyms
- Causus rhombeatus — Bocage, 1895 (part); Causus rhombeatus var. bilineatus Boulenger, 1905; Causus lineatus Laurent, 1955; Causus bilineatus bilineatus — Laurent, 1964; Causus bilineatus — Broadley, 1971

Species of snake

Causus bilineatus is a species of venomous snake in the subfamily Viperinae of the family Viperidae. The species is native to southcentral Africa. There are no subspecies that are recognized as being valid.

== Common names ==
Common names for C. bilineatus include lined night adder, two-lined night adder, and two-striped night adder.

== Description ==
Adults of C. bilineatus have an average total length (tail included) of 30–50 cm (12–20 in), with a reported maximum of 65 cm (26 in).

The head is slightly distinct from the neck, while the snout is fairly long and tapering. Midbody there are 15–18 rows of dorsal scales that are weakly keeled and have a soft and velvety appearance. The ventral scales number 122–141 in males and 128–144 in females. There are 18–30 subcaudals.

The color pattern consists of an ash to auburn to brown ground color, overlaid with numerous irregular or vaguely rectangular black dorsal patches. These patches lie within two distinct and narrow pale stripes that run the length of the body. The belly color is dark to dark cream.

== Geographic range ==
C. bilineatus is found in Angola, southern DR Congo, Rwanda, western Tanzania, and Zambia.

The type locality is given by Boulenger (1905) as "between Benguella and Bihé" (Angola). Bocage (1895) listed "Duque de Bragança, Quissange, Caconda, and Huilla" (Angola) for the localities.

== Habitat ==
C. bilineatus occurs in moist savanna, forest-savanna environments, and swampy habitats, at altitudes of 800–1,800 m (2,600–5,900 ft). Wild-caught specimens found to have eaten clawed frogs, Xenopus, suggest a more aquatic nature than other species.

== Diet ==
C. bilineatus preys mostly upon toads and frogs, particularly the frogs of the genus Xenopus.

== Reproduction ==
C. bilineatus is oviparous.

== Venom ==
C. bilineatus is venomous, and there is no available antivenom. However, no human fatalities from its bite have been recorded.
