= Labial scale =

Scales of reptiles that border the mouth opening

The labial scales are the scales of snakes and other scaled reptiles that border the mouth opening. These do not include the median scales on the upper and lower jaws (rostral and mental scales). The term labial originates from Labium (Latin for "lip"), which refers to any lip-like structure. In snakes, there are two different types of labial scales: supralabials and sublabials. The number of these scales, and sometimes their shapes and sizes, are some of the many characteristics used to differentiate species from one another.

There are two different types of labial scales:

- Supralabials are the scales that form part of the upper lip. Also called upper labials.
- Sublabials are the scales that form part of the lower lip. Also called infralabials or lower labials.

== Related scales ==
- Rostral scale: median scale on the tip of the snout bordering the mouth opening.
- Mental scale: median scale on the tip of the lower jaw.

== See also ==
- Snake scales
- Anatomical terms of location
