= Mental scale =

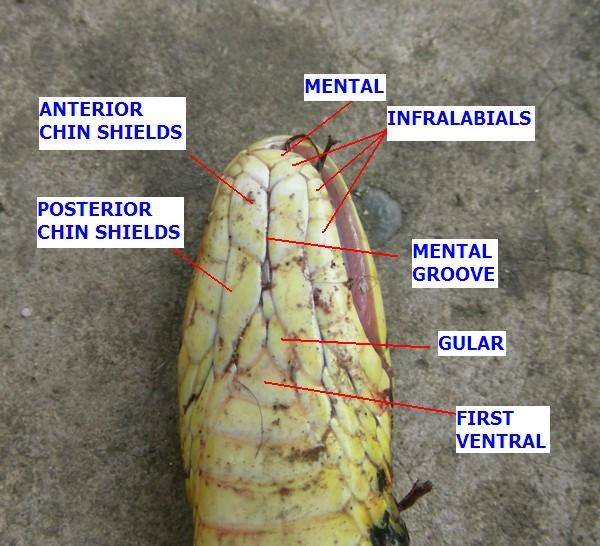
Scales on a snake's head

The mental scale, or mental, in snakes and other scaled reptiles refers to the median plate on the tip of the lower jaw. It is a triangular scale that corresponds to the rostral of the upper jaw. The reference to the term 'mental' comes from the mental nerve which addresses the chin and lower jaw in animals. In snakes, the shape and size of this scale are sometimes among the characteristics used to differentiate species from one another.

== Related scales ==
- Rostral scale
- Labial scales

== See also ==
- Snake scales
- Anatomical terms of location
