= Anal scale =

Scale covering the cloacal opening in snakes

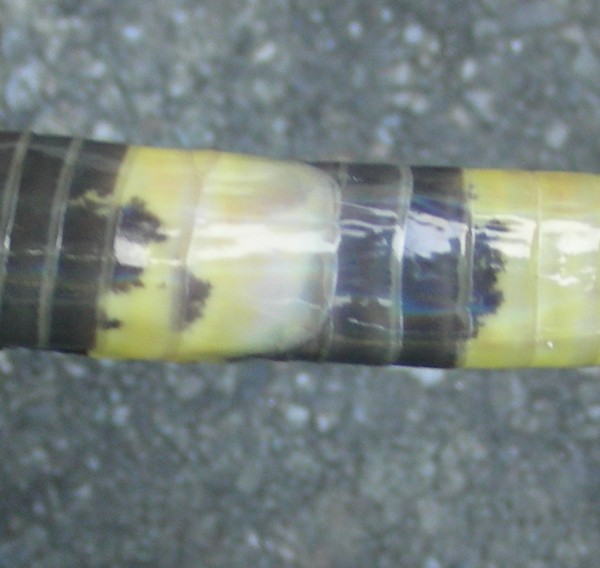
Undivided anal scale of an elapid

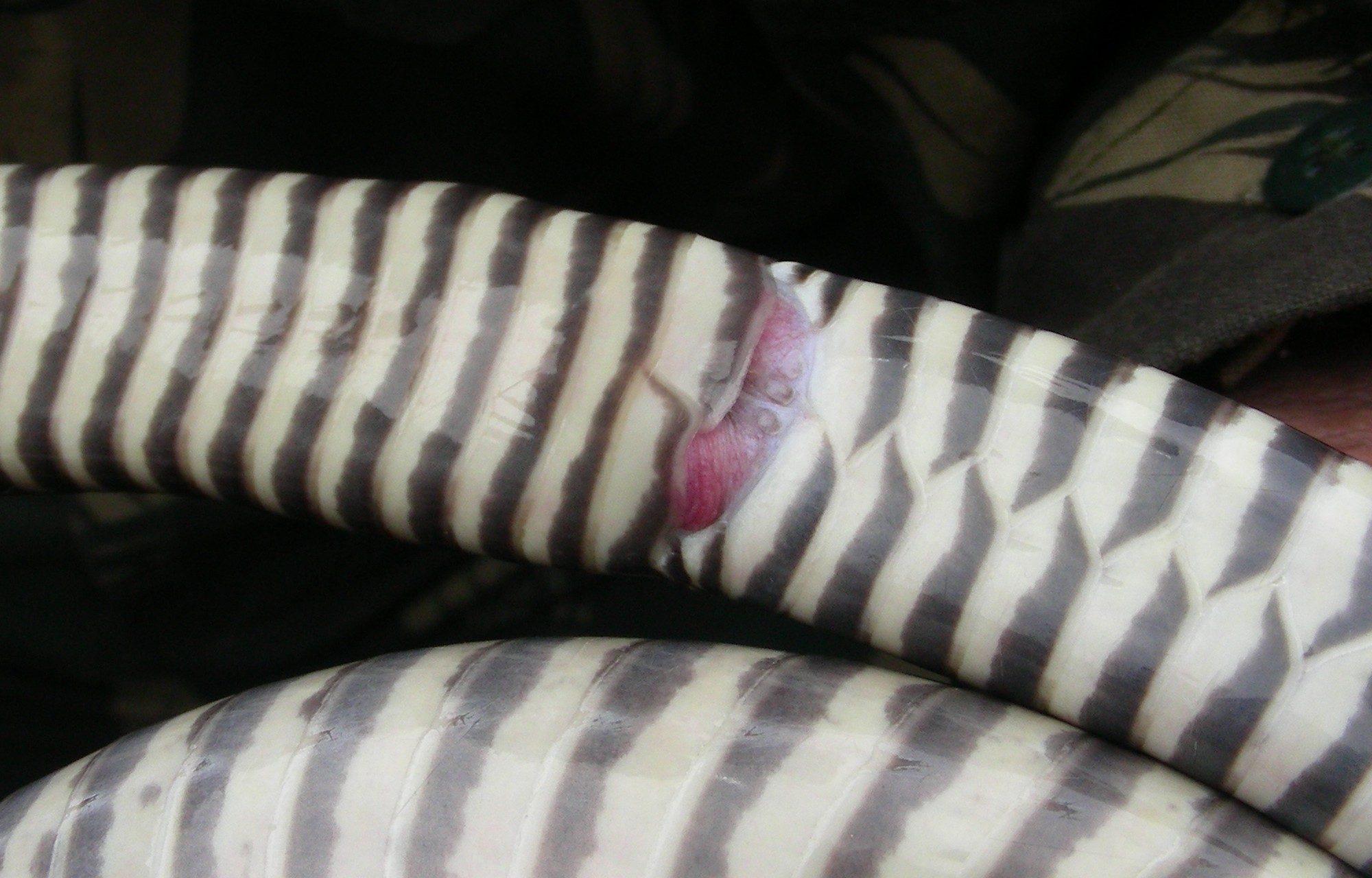
Divided anal scale of Ptyas mucosus, a colubrid. See the undivided ventral scales to its left and the divided caudal scales to the right.

In snakes, the anal scale or anal plate is the scale just in front of and covering the cloacal opening. This scale can be either single ("anal entire") or paired ("anal divided"). When paired, the division is oblique. The anal scale is preceded by the ventral scales and followed by the subcaudal scales.

== See also ==
- Snake scales
