= Gierałtów Wykroty railway station =

Railway station in Gierałtów, south-western Poland

Gierałtów Wykroty
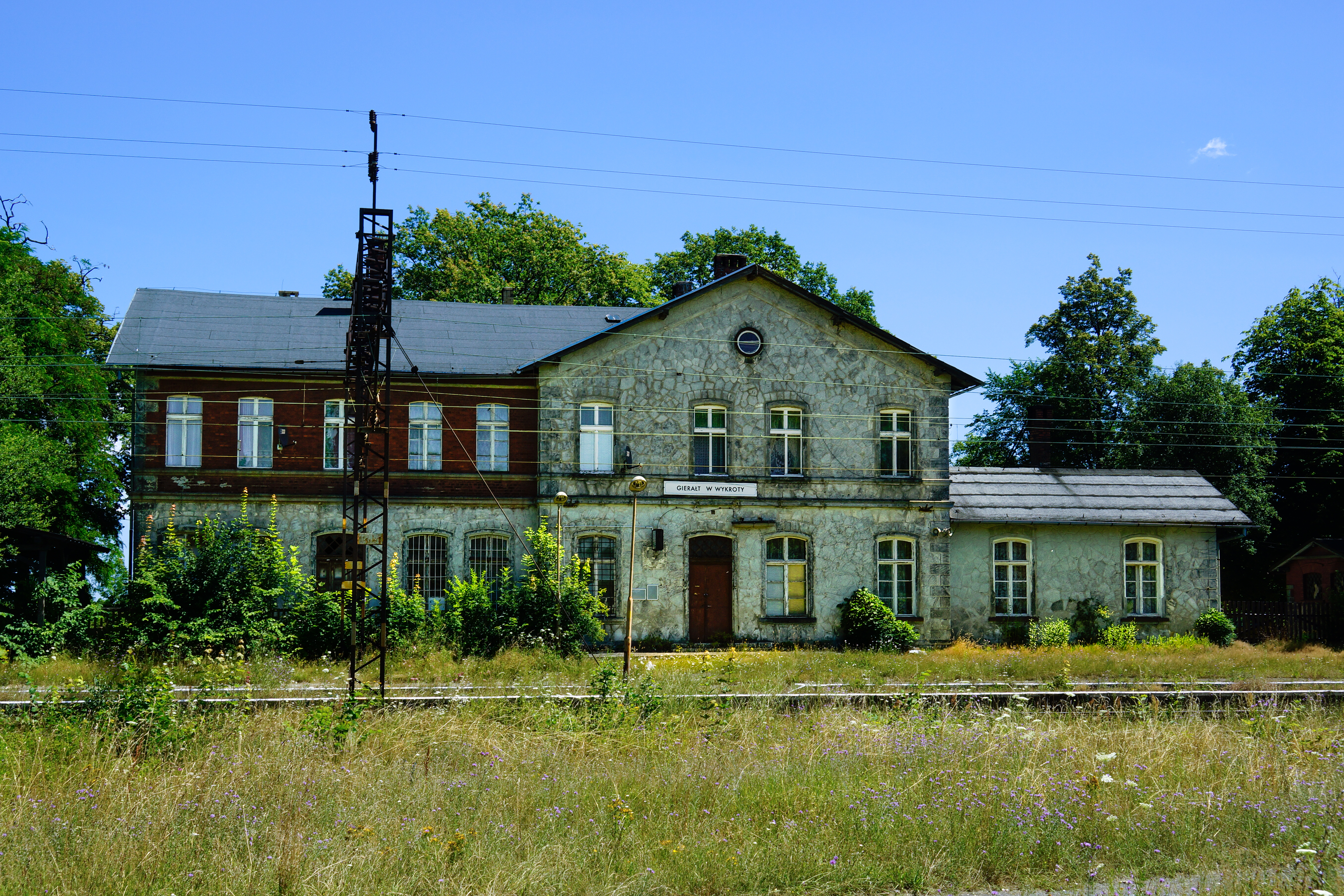
- Station building

General information
- Location: Gierałtów, Lower Silesian Voivodeship; Poland
- Coordinates: 51°13′1″N 15°17′3″E
- Owner: Polskie Koleje Państwowe S.A.
- Lines: Węgliniec–Lubań railway
- Platforms: 3

History
- Opened: 20 September 1865
- Electrified: 1928, re-electrified in 1986
- Former names: Gersdorf-Waldau (before 1945); Przyborsk (1945–1947)

Services
Preceding station	KD	Following station
Węgliniec towards Wrocław Główny	D1	Gierałtów towards Lubań Śląski
Location
- Location within Poland

Gierałtów Wykroty (German: Gersdorf-Waldau) is a railway station on the Węgliniec–Lubań railway in the village of Gierałtów, Bolesławiec County, within the Lower Silesian Voivodeship in south-western Poland.

== Train services ==
The station is served by the following services:

- Regional services (KD) Wrocław - Legnica - Węgliniec - Lubań Sląski

== See also ==
- Węgliniec–Lubań railway
- Gierałtów railway station
