= Friedrich Wilhelm Alexander von Mechow =

German zoologist (1831–1904)

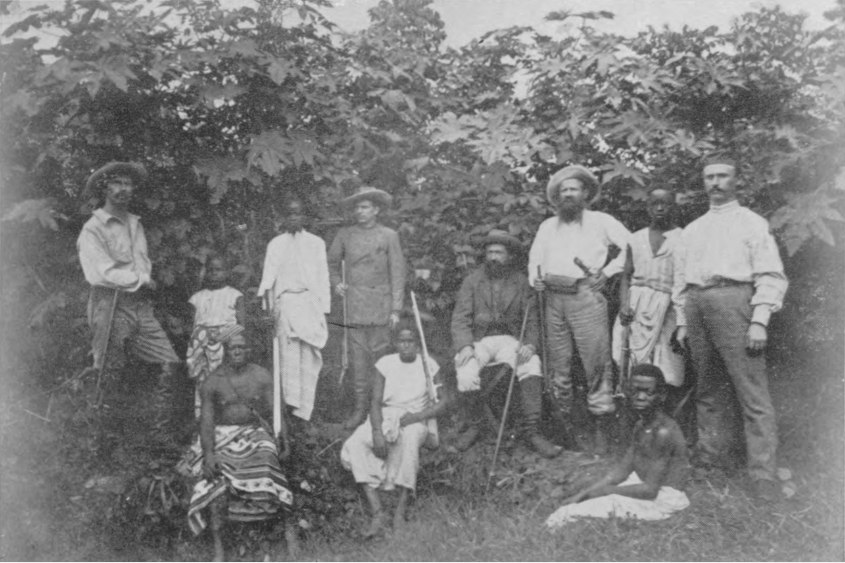
Members of the Deutschen Gesellschaft zur Erforschung Äquatorial Afrikas (1876). Left to right (Europeans in hats): Eduard Pechuël-Loesche, Otto Lindner, Paul Güssfeldt, Major von Mechow, Julius Falkenstein (explorer)

Friedrich Wilhelm Alexander von Mechow (9 December 1831 in Lauban – 14 March 1904 in Jugenheim) was a Prussian explorer of Africa, and a naturalist. Von Mechow was a specialty collector of phanerogams, particularly in Angola. He held the rank of major in the Prussian Army.

Von Mechow joined the Loango-expedition under Paul Güssfeldt. He undertook a second larger exploration between 1879 and 1882 in Angola, where he explored the middle course of the Kwango River. He collected birds for Jean Cabanis and Anton Reichenow at Museum für Naturkunde in Berlin. Together with the botanist Julius Eduard Teucsz he collected plants between 1879 and 1881 distributing the exsiccata-like duplicate specimen series Flora von West-Afrika (Major Alexander v. Mechow's Expedition).

Several species are named for him including a butterfly (Papilio mechowi), the dusky long-tailed cuckoo (Cercococcyx mechowi), and Mechow's mole-rat (Fukomys mechowii).

Von Mechow is commemorated in the scientific name of a species of African snake, Xenocalamus mechowii, and also Mechowia, a genus of flowering plants from Angola, Zambia and Zaïre, belonging to the family Amaranthaceae.

== Works ==
Mechow: Kartenwerk meiner Kuango-Expedition. 28 Blätter. Berlin

== Additional references ==
- James A Jobling, 2009 Helm Dictionary of Scientific Bird Names ISBN 9781408125014
- Personensuche
