= Gierałtów =

- Village
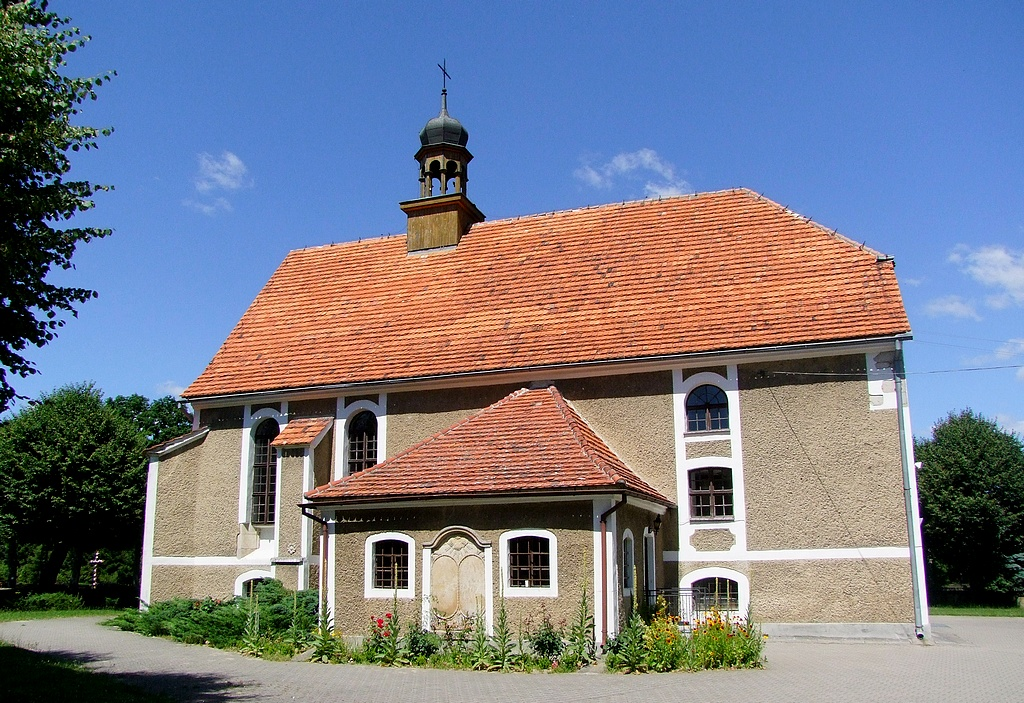
- Church of Saint Anthony

- Location within Poland
- Coordinates: 51°12′11″N 15°18′39″E
- Country: Poland
- Voivodeship: Lower Silesian
- County: Bolesławiec
- Gmina: Nowogrodziec

Population
  - Total: 1,200
- Time zone: UTC+1 (CET)
  - Summer (DST): UTC+2 (CEST)
- Vehicle registration: DBL

Gierałtów [ɡʲɛˈrau̯tuv] (German: Gersdorf am Queis) is a village in the administrative district of Gmina Nowogrodziec, within Bolesławiec County, Lower Silesian Voivodeship, in south-western Poland.

== Transport ==
The village is served by Gierałtów and Gierałtów Wykroty railway stations on the Węgliniec–Lubań railway.
