= Xenocalamus sabiensis =

Scientific classification
- Kingdom: Animalia
- Phylum: Chordata
- Class: Reptilia
- Order: Squamata
- Suborder: Serpentes
- Family: Atractaspididae
- Genus: Xenocalamus
- Species: X. sabiensis

Binomial name
- Xenocalamus sabiensis Broadley, 1971

Species of snake

Xenocalamus sabiensis, or the Sabi quill-snouted snake, is a species of mildly venomous rear-fanged snake in the family Atractaspididae. It is endemic to Africa.

== Geographic range ==
It is found in Mozambique, Republic of South Africa, and Zimbabwe.
