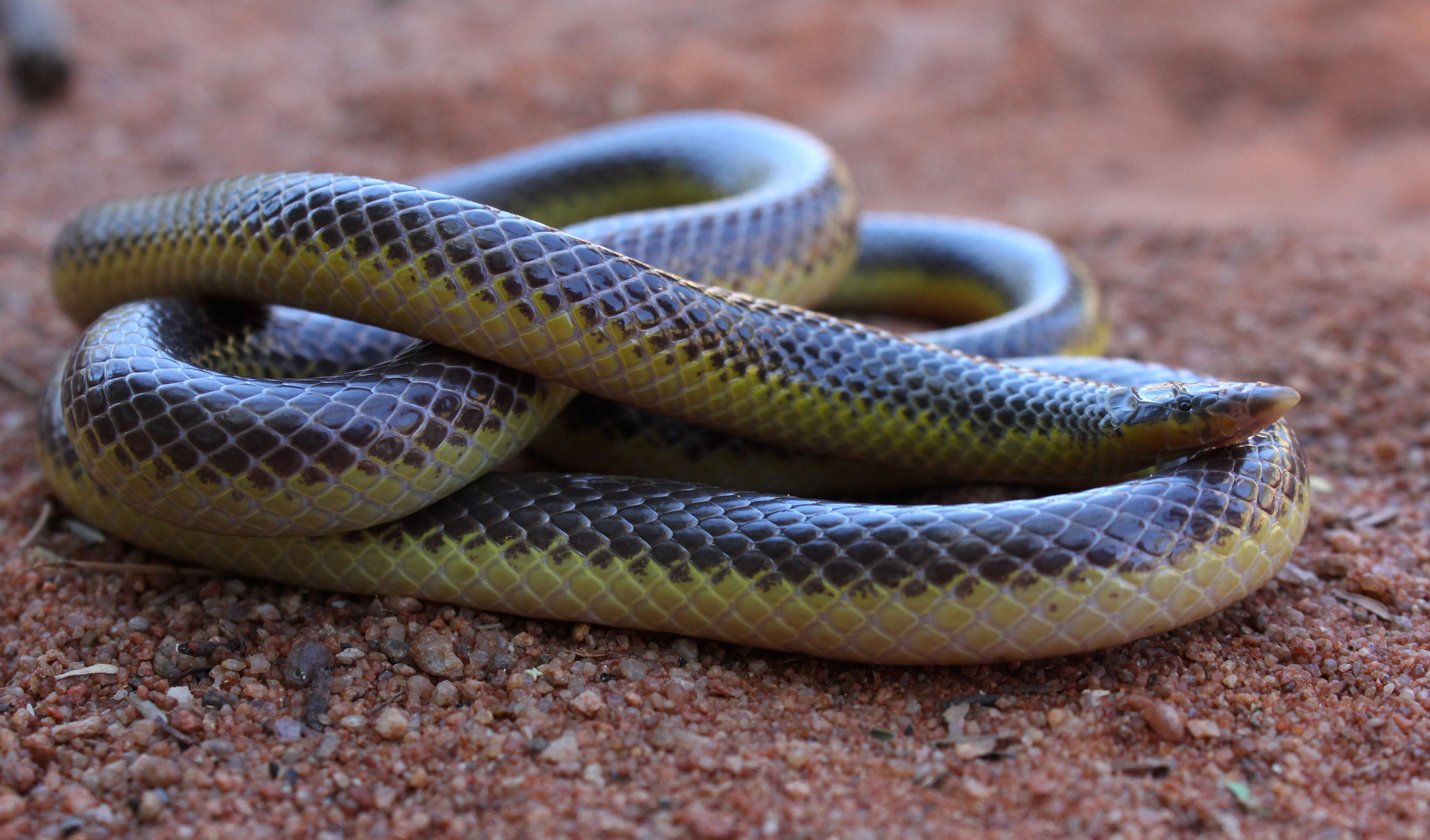
- Xenocalamus bicolor (Slender Quill-snouted Snake)

Scientific classification
- Kingdom: Animalia
- Phylum: Chordata
- Class: Reptilia
- Order: Squamata
- Suborder: Serpentes
- Family: Atractaspididae
- Subfamily: Aparallactinae
- Genus: Xenocalamus; Günther, 1868

= Xenocalamus =

Genus of snakes

Common name: quill-snouted snakes.

Xenocalamus is a genus of rear-fanged mildly venomous snakes in the family Atractaspididae. The genus is endemic to Africa. Five species are recognized as being valid.

== Description (diagnosis) of genus ==
Snakes of the genus Xenocalamus exhibit the following characters:

Maxillary very short, with five teeth gradually increasing in size and followed, after an interspace, by two large grooved fangs situated below the eye. Anterior mandibular teeth slightly larger than the posterior ones. Palate toothless.

Head small, not distinct from neck. Snout pointed, very prominent, very flattened. Rostral very large with obtuse horizontal edge, flat below. Eye minute, with round pupil. Nostril between two nasals, the posterior nasal very large. No loreal. Prefrontals absent (fused with the frontal). No anterior temporal.

Body cylindrical; tail very short, obtuse.

Dorsal scales smooth, without apical pits, arranged in 17 rows. Ventrals rounded; subcaudals in two rows.

== Species ==
Genus Xenocalamus -- 5 species
| Species | Taxon author | Subspecies* | Common name | Geographic range |
| X. bicolor | Günther, 1868 | australis lineatus machadoi maculatus pernasutus | slender quill-snouted snake | Angola, Democratic Republic of the Congo, Namibia, Botswana, Republic of South Africa, Mozambique, Zimbabwe. |
| X. mechowii | W. Peters, 1881 | inornatus | elongate quill-snouted snake | Namibia, Botswana, Zimbabwe, Zambia, Angola, Democratic Republic of the Congo, Congo, |
| X. michelli | L. Müller, 1911 | ———— | Michell's quill-snouted snake | southern Democratic Republic of the Congo. |
| X. sabiensis | Broadley, 1971 | ———— | Sabi quill-snouted snake | Zimbabwe to Mozambique. |
| X. transvaalensis | Methuen, 1919 | ———— | Transvaal quill-snouted snake | North Transvaal and Zululand in Republic of South Africa, southern Mozambique, Botswana. |

*) Not including the nominate subspecies.

== See also ==
- Snakebite.
