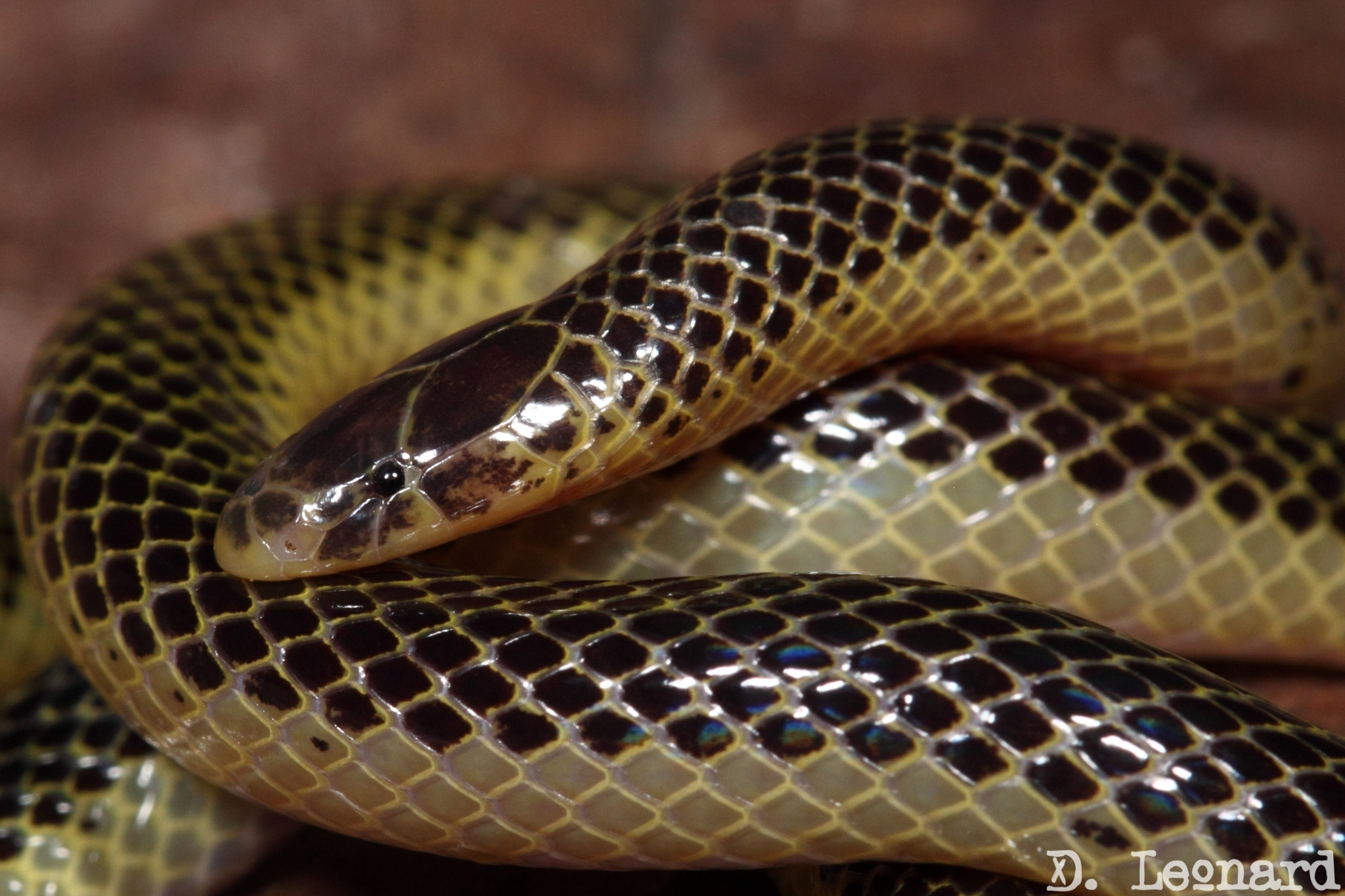
- Photograph by Dylan Leonard

Conservation status
- Least Concern (IUCN 3.1)

Scientific classification
- Kingdom: Animalia
- Phylum: Chordata
- Class: Reptilia
- Order: Squamata
- Suborder: Serpentes
- Family: Atractaspididae
- Genus: Xenocalamus
- Species: X. transvaalensis

Binomial name
- Xenocalamus transvaalensis Methuen, 1919

= Xenocalamus transvaalensis =

Species of snake

Common names: Transvaal quill-snouted snake, Speckled quill-snouted snake

Xenocalamus transvaalensis is a species of mildly venomous rear-fanged snake in the family Atractaspididae. The species is endemic to Africa. There are no subspecies that are recognized as being valid.

== Geographic range ==
X. transvaalensis is found in Botswana, southern Mozambique, Republic of South Africa (former Northern Transvaal and former Zululand), and Zimbabwe.

== Description ==
X. transvaalensis is black dorsally, and white ventrally. Males may attain a total length (including tail) of 37 cm (14 1/2 in); females, 31.5 cm (12 3/8 in).

== Reproduction ==
In summer an adult female X. transvaalensis may lay two elongated eggs, 28 mm x 6 mm (1 1/16 in x 3/16 in).
