= Węgliniec–Lubań railway =

Railway line in Lower Silesia, Poland

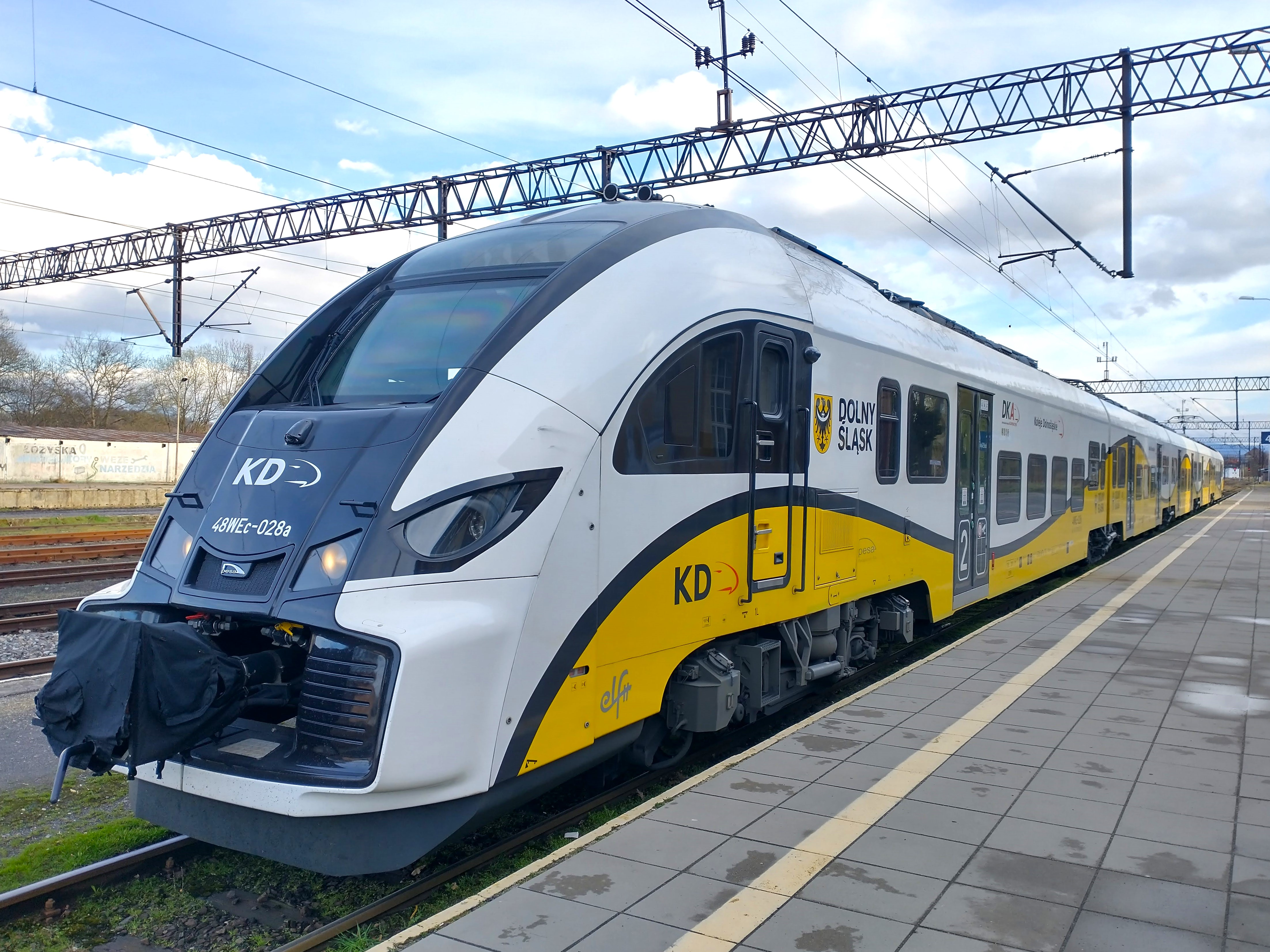
- Lower Silesian Railways 48WEc at Lubań Śląski

Overview
- Line number: PKP 279
- Locale: Lower Silesian Voivodeship, Poland
- Termini: Węgliniec; Lubań Śląski
- Stations: 4

History
- Opened: 1865
- Electrified: 1928, re-electrified in 1986

Technical
- Line length: 22.121 km (13.745 mi)
- Num of tracks: 1
- Track gauge: 1,435 mm (4 ft 8 1/2 in) standard gauge
- Operating speed: 90 km/h (56 mph)

The Węgliniec–Lubań railway is an electrified, single-track railway line connecting Węgliniec railway station in Węgliniec and Lubań Śląski railway station in Lubań in the Lower Silesian Voivodeship of south-western Poland.

== History ==
=== Pre World War II ===
The construction of the line was approved by the Landtag of Prussia on 22 January 1862 with construction beginning on September 1863. The line opened two years later on 20 September 1865, part of the Silesian Mountain Railway. It was often used to transport coal across Lower Silesia.

At the time, the only through station was Gierałtów Wykroty (German: Gersdorf-Waldau). On the same day when the line opened in 1865, the line to Görlitz from Lubań was also opened.

The line was electrified on 3 April 1928. By 1935, ten pairs of multiple-unit trains were in service from Węgliniec. During the summer, express trains operated on the line, running from Szczecin to Hirschberg via Żary, Węgliniec, and Lubań. This service was withdrawn due to the outbreak of World War II.

=== Post World War II ===
Near the end of World War II, the Red Army dismantled the overhead wires of the line, unelectrifying it. This was done under 'World War II reparation claims'.

After World War II, the area came under Polish Administration. As a result, the line was taken over by Polish State Railways. Radogoszcz and Krucze Gniazdo (German: Rabenhorst) railway stations were both closed.

In May 1971, Gierałtów railway station was opened on the line. On 30 May 1986, the line was re-electrified.

On 9 December 2012 the line was closed, due to its extremely poor condition, which resulted in longer travel times. During the closure, trains were on diversion via Zgorzelec. The line was re-opened on 15 December 2013.

== Train services ==
The line is served by regional Lower Silesian Railways route D1, from Wrocław Główny via Legnica and Węgliniec.
