= Mechowia =

Scientific classification
- Kingdom: Plantae
- Clade: Tracheophytes
- Clade: Angiosperms
- Clade: Eudicots
- Order: Caryophyllales
- Family: Amaranthaceae
- Genus: Mechowia; Schinz

Genus of flowering plant

Mechowia is a genus of flowering plants belonging to the family Amaranthaceae. It is also in the Amaranthoideae subfamily.

It is native to Angola, Zambia and Zaïre (or Democratic Republic of the Congo).

The genus name of Mechowia is in honour of Friedrich Wilhelm Alexander von Mechow (1831–1890), a Prussian explorer of Africa, and a naturalist. Von Mechow was a specialty collector of phanerogams, particularly in Angola. He also held the rank of major in the Prussian Army. It was first described and published in H.G.A.Engler & K.A.E.Prantl, Nat. Pflanzenfam. Vol.3 (Issue 1a) on page 110 in 1893.

== Known species ==
According to Kew:

- Mechowia grandiflora Schinz
- Mechowia redactifolia C.C.Towns.
