= Gierałtów railway station =

Railway station in Gierałtów, south-western Poland

Coordinates: 51°11′31″N 15°17′59″E

Gierałtów

General information
- Location: Gierałtów, Lower Silesian Voivodeship; Poland
- Owner: Polskie Koleje Państwowe S.A.
- Lines: Węgliniec–Lubań railway
- Platforms: 1

History
- Opened: May 1970
- Electrified: 30 May 1986

Services
Preceding station	KD	Following station
Gierałtów Wykroty towards Wrocław Główny	D1	Lubań Śląski Terminus
Location

Gierałtów is a railway station on the Węgliniec–Lubań railway in the village of Gierałtów, Bolesławiec County, within the Lower Silesian Voivodeship in south-western Poland.

== Train services ==
The station is a request stop of Lower Silesian Railways services.

The station is served by the following services:

- Regional services (KD) Wrocław - Legnica - Węgliniec - Lubań Sląski

== See also ==
- Węgliniec–Lubań railway
- Gierałtów Wykroty railway station
