= Xenocalamus michelli =

Conservation status
- Least Concern (IUCN 3.1)

Scientific classification
- Kingdom: Animalia
- Phylum: Chordata
- Class: Reptilia
- Order: Squamata
- Suborder: Serpentes
- Family: Atractaspididae
- Genus: Xenocalamus
- Species: X. michelli

Binomial name
- Xenocalamus michelli L. Müller, 1911

Species of snake

Xenocalamus michelli, or Michell's quill-snouted snake, is a species of mildly venomous rear-fanged snake in the family Atractaspididae. The species is endemic to Africa.

== Etymology ==
The specific name, michelli, is in honor of a Captain Michell who collected the holotype.

== Geographic range ==
X. michelli is found in Katanga Province in southern Democratic Republic of the Congo.

== Reproduction ==
X. michelli is oviparous.
