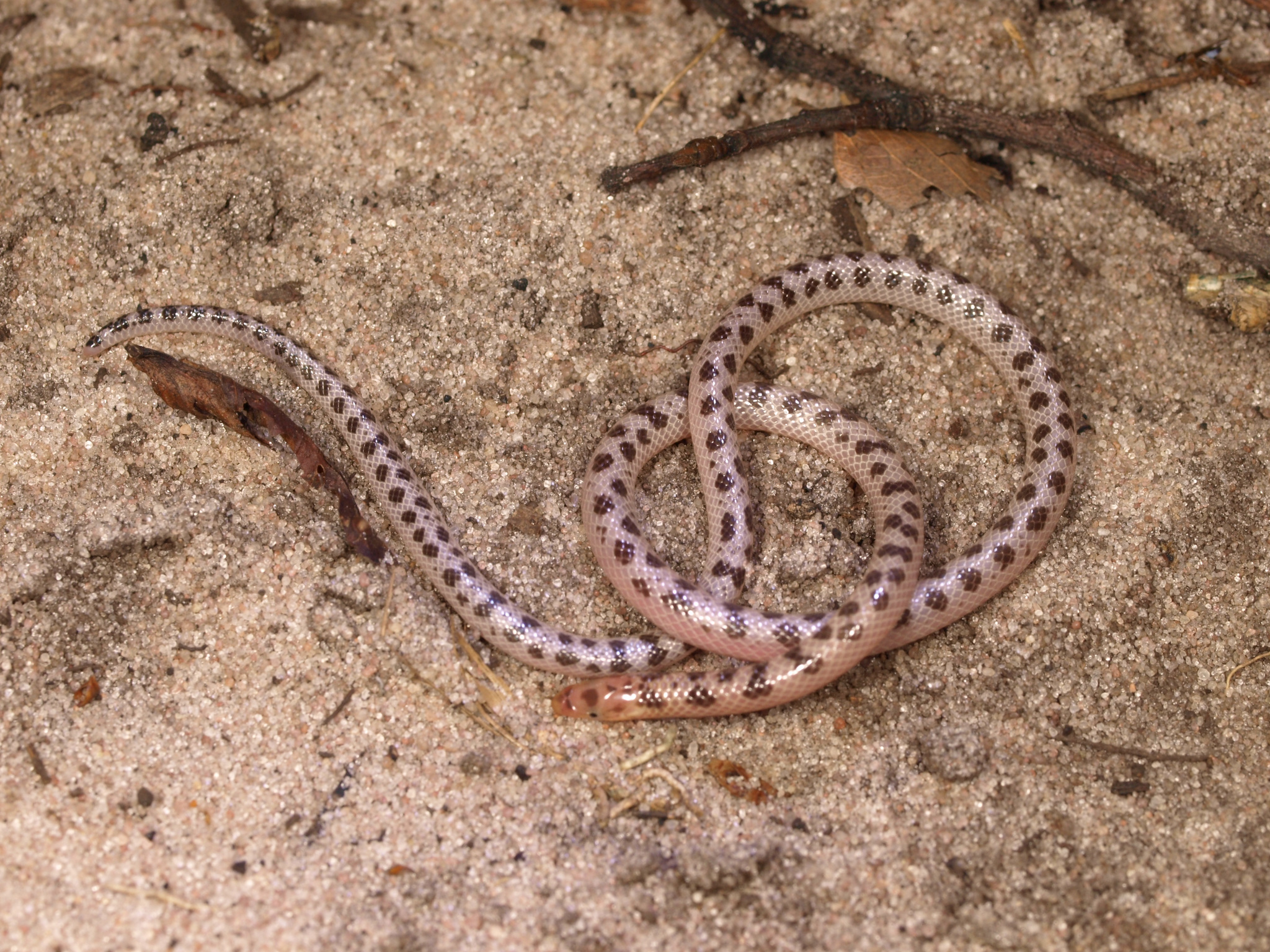

Conservation status
- Least Concern (IUCN 3.1)

Scientific classification
- Kingdom: Animalia
- Phylum: Chordata
- Class: Reptilia
- Order: Squamata
- Suborder: Serpentes
- Family: Atractaspididae
- Genus: Xenocalamus
- Species: X. mechowii

Binomial name
- Xenocalamus mechowii W. Peters, 1881

= Xenocalamus mechowii =

Species of snake

Xenocalamus mechowii, or the elongate quill-snouted snake, is a species of mildly venomous rear-fanged snake in the subfamily Aparallactinae of the family Atractaspididae. The species is endemic to Africa. There are two recognized subspecies.

== Etymology ==
The specific name or epithet, mechowii, is in honor of Friedrich Wilhelm Alexander von Mechow, a Silesian-German explorer of Africa.

== Geographic range ==
Xenocalamus mechowii is found in Angola, Botswana, Republic of the Congo, Democratic Republic of the Congo, Namibia, Zambia, and Zimbabwe.

== Habitat ==
The preferred habitat of Xenocalamus mechowii is savanna on Kalahari sand, at elevations up to 1,000 m (3,300 ft).

== Description ==
Dorsally, Xenocalamus mechowii is yellowish with brown spots, some spots arranged in alternating confluent pairs, others forming crossbands. The upper lip, sides of the body, and venter are unspotted.

A subadult 22.5 cm (8 3/4 in) in total length has a tail 3.5 cm (1 3/8 in) long.

The species exhibits sexual dimorphism. Adult males may attain a snout-to-vent length (SVL) of 58 cm (23 in). Females are larger, and may attain 80 cm (31 in) SVL.

The dorsal scales are smooth, without apical pits, arranged in 17 rows. The ventrals number 229–239. The anal plate is divided, and the subcaudals which number 31–36 are also divided.

The head scalation is the same as Xenocalamus bicolor, except there are no supraoculars and two postoculars.

The snout is very depressed and very prominent.

== Behavior ==
Xenocalamus mechowii is terrestrial and fossorial.

== Diet ==
Xenocalamus mechowii preys on amphisbaenians, which it finds by burrowing.

== Reproduction ==
Xenocalamus mechowii is oviparous. An adult female may lay a clutch of as many as four eggs.

== Subspecies ==
Two subspecies of Xenocalamus mechowii are recognized as being valid, including the nominate race.

- Xenocalamus mechowii inornatus de Witte & Laurent, 1947
- Xenocalamus mechowii mechowii W. Peters, 1881

Intergrades of these two subspecies can be found in North-Western Province, Zambia.
