= Lubań Śląski railway station =

Railway station in Lubań, south-western Poland

Lubań Śląski
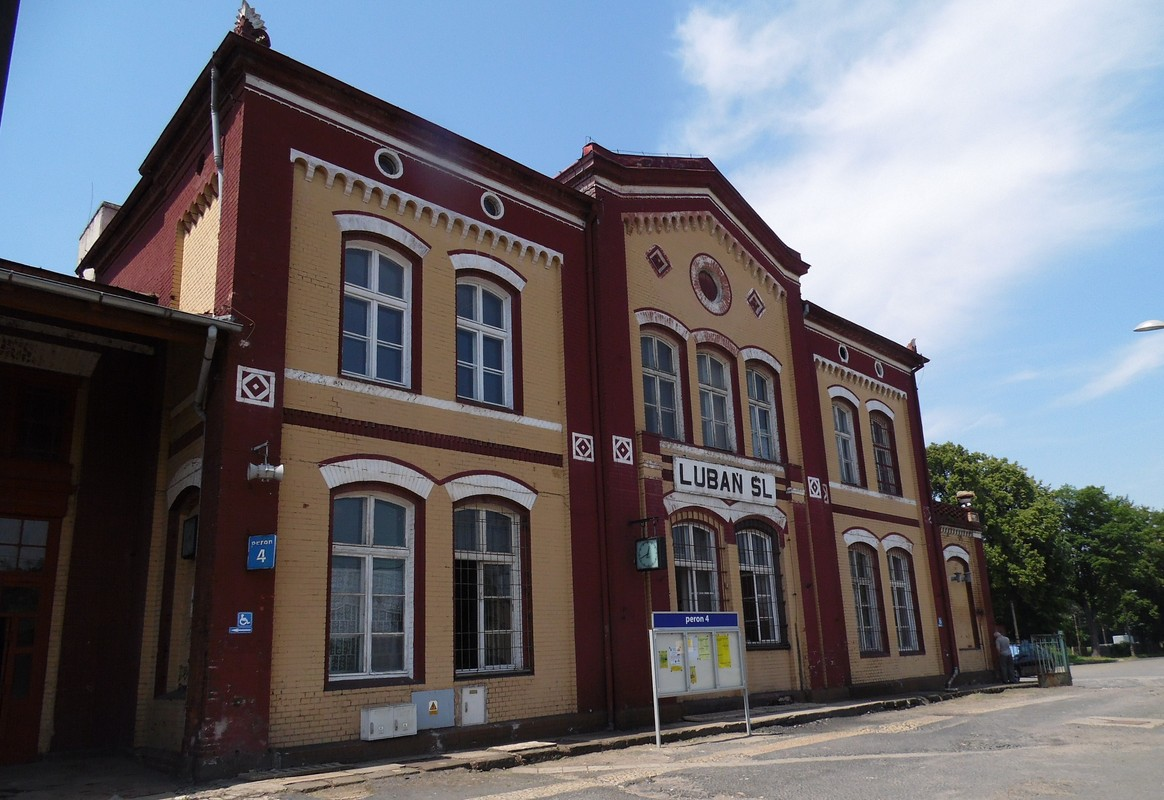
- Station building

General information
- Location: Lubań, Lower Silesian Voivodeship; Poland
- Coordinates: 51°06′42″N 15°17′37″E
- Owner: Polish State Railways
- Operator: Lower Silesian Railways
- Lines: Wrocław Świebodzki–Zgorzelec railway; Węgliniec–Lubań railway; Lubań–Leśna railway (freight only)
- Platforms: 6

Construction
- Architect: Hermann Cuno

History
- Opened: 20 September 1865
- Electrified: 1928, re-electrified in 1986
- Former names: Lauban (before 1945)

Services
Preceding station	KD	Following station
Gierałtów towards Wrocław Główny	D1	Terminus
Preceding station	KD	Following station
Olszyna Lubańska towards Świeradów-Zdrój or Karpacz	D62	Zaręba towards Görlitz
Location
- Location within Poland

Lubań Śląski (German: Lauban) is a railway station in the town of Lubań, within the Lower Silesian Voivodeship, in south-western Poland.

== History ==
=== Pre World War II ===
On 22 January 1862, the Landtag of Prussia approved construction of the Silesian Mountain Railway from Wałbrzych to Węgliniec via Lubań. The city of Görlitz also provided land free of charge to build a direct line to Zgorzelec.

On 13 August 1863, celebrations were held in Lubań and Zgorzelec to mark the beginning of the construction. Construction work began of the Węgliniec–Lubań railway in September of the same year. The first train was tested between Zgorzelec and Lubań on 13 July 1865.

In 1868 a train maintenance depot opened. Electric locomotives were maintained here from 1917. This depot developed into one of the most important depots for the maintenance overhaul of electric locomotives.

The station held its grand opening on 20 September 1865, with the opening of the Węgliniec–Lubań railway and a part of the Wrocław Świebodzki–Zgorzelec railway. The Lubań–Leśna railway opened in 1896.

Electrification of the lines began in the early 1920s. In 1922, the electrification of the Wrocław Świebodzki–Zgorzelec railway to Jelenia Góra was completed, with the electrification to Zgorzelec being completed in 1923. Electrification of the Węgliniec–Lubań railway was completed in 1928.

The town of Lubań including the station and train maintenance depots were severely damaged during World War II.

=== Post World War II ===
After World War II, the area was placed under Polish administration. As a result, Polish State Railways took over the ownership of the station and all lines. The station was renamed to Lubań. The word Śląski (Polish for Silesian) was added for designation.

In 1946, one of the lines of track on the Silesian Mountain Railway was dismantled by the Red Army under 'war reparations'. This made the line a single track. Overhead wires were also dismantled.

Despite the lack of connection to an electrified railway, during the 1970s electric locomotives were still being maintained at the depot. Re-electrification of the Wrocław Świebodzki–Zgorzelec railway to Jelenia Góra was completed on 13 December 1986. The line to Görlitz/Zgorzelec wasn't electrified, and instead was downgraded to a branch line.

In 1991 passenger train services on the Lubań–Leśna railway were withdrawn. As a result, the line is now only used by freight trains. In 2000 the train maintenance depots were abandoned as the owner company ZNTK Lubań filed for bankruptcy. In the following years tracks of the depot were dismantled.

Between 2002 and 2008 services to Görlitz/Zgorzelec were suspended. All trains terminated at Lubań Śląski.

In July 2026 it was announced that the station will undergo a full modernisation which will include the renovation of the station building. The project is set to be completed in the first half of 2028.

== Train services ==
The station is served by the following services:

- Regional services (KD) Wrocław - Legnica - Węgliniec - Lubań Śląski
- Regional services (KD) Karpacz / Świeradów-Zdrój - Gryfów Śląski - Görlitz
