= Otto Lindner =

German engineer and explorer

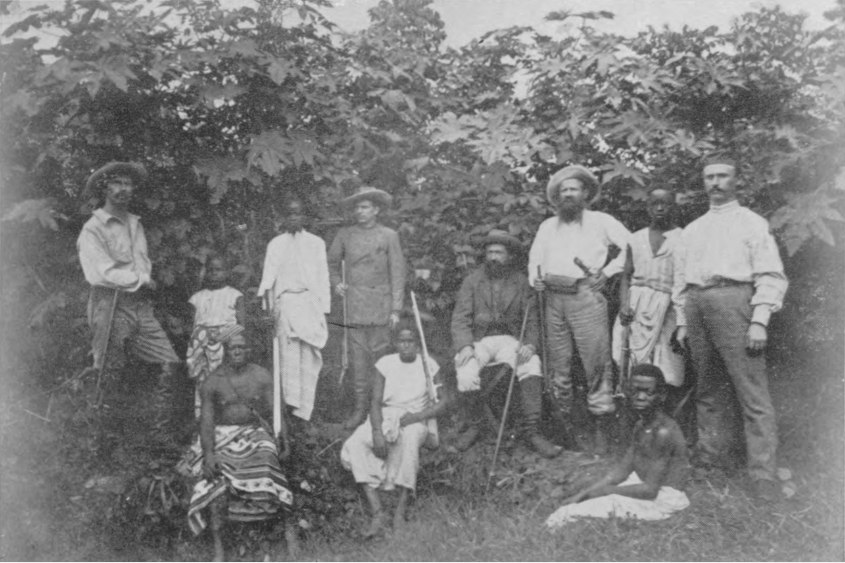
- Members of the Deutschen Gesellschaft zur Erforschung äquatorialAfrika (1876). Left to right (Europeans in hats): Dr Pechuël-Loesche, Otto Lindner, Dr Güssfeldt, Major von Mechow, Dr Falkenstein
- Born: 10 August 1852; Berlin, Prussia
- Died: 16 February 1945 (aged 92); Ypres, Belgium
- Occupations: Engineer, explorer

Otto Lindner (10 August 1852 – 16 February 1945) was a German engineer and explorer.

== Early years ==
Otto Lindner was born on 10 August 1852 in Berlin. His parents were Heinrich Ernst Lindner and Henrietta-Augusta Teubert, both Saxon. He married Marie-Ursule-Eugénie Leclercq. He was trained as an engineering technician in Berlin.

== Loango expedition (1873–1876) ==
As a young man Lindner was part of the "Deutsche Gesellschaft zur Erforschung Aequatorial-Africas” expedition to the Loango region in 1873–1876. He embarked at Liverpool on 1 October 1873 in the company of Dr. Julius Falkenstein. He was employed at the Chinchoxo base in various technical occupations. In June–July 1874 he accompanied the expedition head Dr. Paul Güssfeldt on an exploration of the Kwilu-Niari River. He became seriously ill and returned. On 7 February 1875 while hunting buffalo Lindner was wounded by a gunshot from an unknown African. In early January 1876, Lindner, Dr. Falkenstein and Dr Eduard Pechuël-Loesche, came to the aid of the French mission of the Fathers of the Holy Spirit in Landana. On 5 May 1876 the German scientific mission embarked at Landana without having achieved all its goals.

== Later career ==
Otto Lindner returned to Africa in the service of the Rotterdam-based "Afrikaansche Handelsvereeniging" (African Trade Association). He landed at Banana at the mouth of the Congo River on 16 January 1877. He was in charge of the Ponta da Lenha factory and associated commercial facilities for more than four years. During this period, he came to know Henry Morton Stanley. Lindner left Banana on 10 July 1880 after his contract expired. On 19 August 1880, he joined the Comité d'Études du Haut-Congo (Upper Congo Study Committee), an instrument of King Leopold II of Belgium, and remained in the king´s service until 1 December 1885. On 30 March 1881, Maximilien Strauch wrote to Lindner,

The success of our enterprise depends entirely on the promptness with which we will occupy before all other competitors the most favourable sites for trade and conclude with the native chiefs treaties of friendship which will secure us large territorial concessions and special commercial advantages... It is only when we will have cast on the Upper Congo the basis of important establishments that we may begin the work which will put those establishments in communication with the Atlantic Ocean.

In June 1881, Otto Lindner reached Stanley at Manyanga with a contingent of new recruits from Zanzibar and letters from the last six months. In 1881–82, he was in command of Vivi in the lower Congo region, where Louis-Gustave Amelot stayed for about a year. Leopold named Lindner at different times for recruiting missions he planned in China, Lagos, Liberia and Tana, and for founding a trading and shipping company. From February to July 1886, the Congo Free State employed Lindner on a recruiting mission in Damaraland. Lindner joined the Compagnie du Congo pour le Commerce et l’Industrie (Congo Company for Commerce and Industry) as secretary at the start of 1887. On 19 January 1888, in Schaerbeek he married a French woman, Marie Leclercq. On 7 June 1888, he became a naturalized Belgian citizen.

In 1893, the Compagnie du Chemin de Fer du Congo (Congo Railway Company) sent him to South Africa to buy oxen and wagons made of special wood. In 1900, he undertook a mission in China and Japan for the Compagnie Belge Commerciale, Industrielle et Minière pour l’Extrême-Orient (Belgian Far East Commercial, Industrial and Mining Company). In 1902, the same company sent him on a prospecting mission to the Kouilou-Niari River. On 17 August 1907, Lindner set out from Brussels on a trip to China for the Compagnie Générale des Conduites d’Eau (General Water Pipe Company) of Liège to examine the possibility of sales outlets. Nothing came out of the trip due to the Chinese financial difficulties. His travel diary has survived for his journey from Zhenjiang, near Shanghai, to Chengdu in the province of Sichuan in 1908.

Lindner returned to Belgium in 1909. As a reward for his patriotism, and for improving the Viven-Bessières grenade and developing an aviation bomb, Lindner was granted full citizenship on 2 August 1926. That year he left Ixelles to settle in Ypres and to indulge in hunting and fishing. Lindner died on 16 February 1945 in Ypres.

== Sources ==
- Engels, A. (31 July 1947), "AMELOT (Louis-Gustave)", Biographie Coloniale Belge (in French), vol. I, Inst. roy. colon. belge, pp. 22–24
- Luwel, Marcel (1959), Otto Lindner 1852-1945 Een weinig bekend medewerker van Leopold II in Afrika (PDF) (in French), Koninklijk Museum van Belgisch-Congo te Tervuren
- Luwel, M. (28 November 1984), "LINDNER [Otto)" (PDF), Biographie Coloniale Belge (in French), vol. VII–C, Inst. roy. colon. belge, pp. col.251–280
- Newman, James L. (2004). Imperial Footprints: Henry Morton Stanley's African Journeys. Potomac Books, Inc. ISBN 978-1-57488-597-2.
- Stengers, Jean (1969), "Leopold II et la rivalité franco-anglaise en Afrique, 1882-1884", Revue belge de philologie et d'histoire (in French), 47 (2): 425–479, doi:10.3406/rbph.1969.2770
