= Lubań =

Town in Lower Silesian Voivodeship, Poland

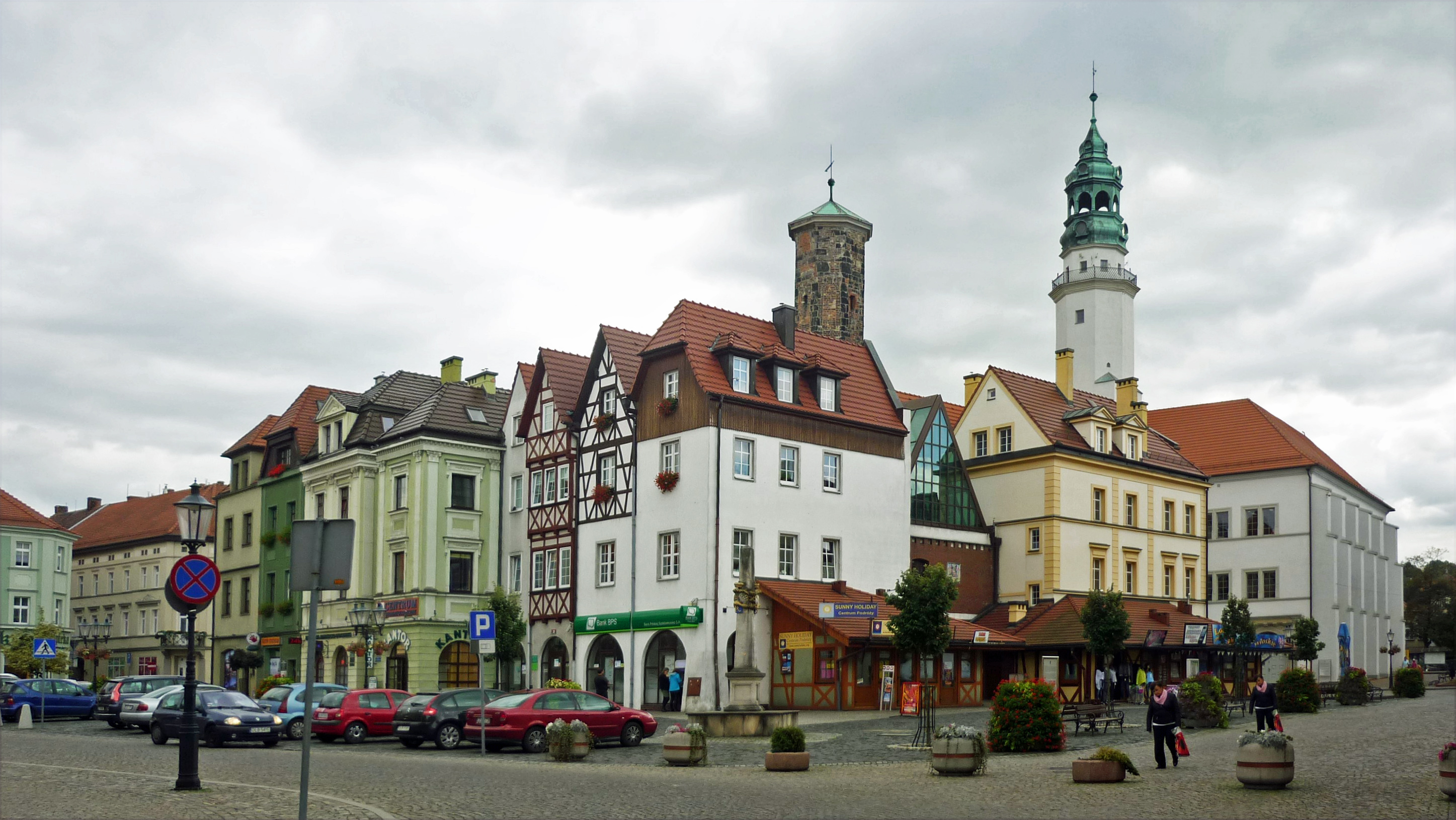
- Old Town

- Flag Coat of arms

- Location within Poland
- Coordinates: 51°07′05″N 15°17′20″E
- Country: Poland
- Voivodeship: Lower Silesian
- County: Lubań
- Gmina: Lubań (urban gmina)

Government
  - Mayor: Grzegorz Wieczorek

Area
  - Total: 16.12 km^{2} (6.22 sq mi)

Population (2019-06-30)
  - Total: 21,345
  - Density: 1,324/km^{2} (3,429/sq mi)
- Time zone: UTC+1 (CET)
  - Summer (DST): UTC+2 (CEST)
- Postal code: 59-800
- Area code: +48 75
- Car plates: DLB
- Website: http://www.luban.pl

Lubań [ˈlubaɲ] (German: Lauban; (Note: formerly also Luban) Czech: Lubáň; Upper Sorbian: Lubań Šlešćina, pronounced [ˈlubanʲ ˈʃlɛʃtʃina]), sometimes called Lubań Śląski (lit. 'Silesian Lubań'); is a town in the Lower Silesian Voivodeship in southwest Poland. It is the administrative seat of Lubań County and also of the smaller Gmina Lubań (although it is not part of the territory of the latter, as the town is a separate urban gmina in its own right).

Founded in the Middle Ages, Lubań is a historic town with a preserved medieval urban layout and heritage sites in a variety of styles, including Gothic, Renaissance and Baroque. For centuries, it prospered from trade, clothmaking and brewing. In recent history, it became known as the location of a major German-operated camp for Allied prisoners of war and civilians during the First World War. Lubań hosts the annual Sudetes Festival of Minerals, one of the largest geology and mineralogy festivals in Europe, and is the location of the Specialised Training Centre of the Border Guard of Poland.

== Geography ==
Situated north of the Jizera Mountains on the western shore of the Kwisa River, Lubań is considered part of the historic Upper Lusatia region, although it was more closely associated with Lower Silesia in the early 14th century and from 1815. It is located about 25 km (16 mi) east of Zgorzelec and about 45 km (28 mi) northwest of Jelenia Góra.

== Etymology ==
There are various hypotheses about the origin of the name. It may derive from the Slavic words luby or lub, or from the name of its founder.

The town was first documented in 1238 as Luban, which is also its former German name. The place name was adopted from an older West Slavic settlement, which is recorded as Aldenluban (German for "old Luban") in 1303. Other German forms recorded in medieval documents are Lauben, Lawben (both from 1336) and Lauban (from 1442). From the beginning of the 16th century, Lauban was the commonly used name of the town. It served as the official name until 1945.

Polish-language publications of the 19th century referred to the town variously as Lubiany (1847), Lubań (1884), and Lubin (1888). When the town passed to Poland after the Second World War, Lubań was determined as the town's official name in 1946.

== History ==
=== Middle Ages ===
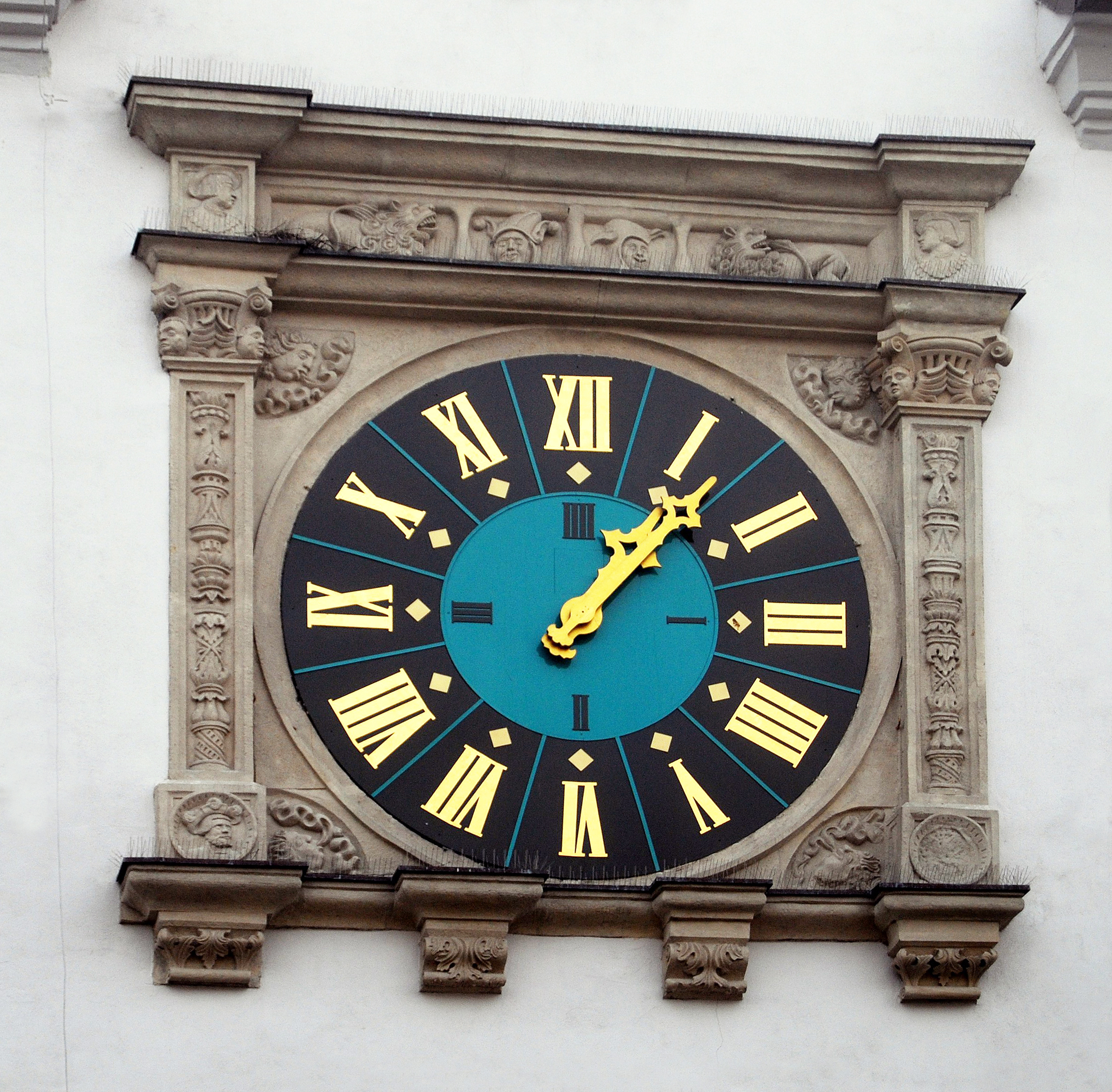
Main clock at the town hall at the market square

The town probably is at the site of a small settlement established by the Bieżuńczanie, a West Slavic tribe of the Elbe Slavic-Sorbian cultural area, in the 9th and 10th century. Bieżuńczanie together with the Sorbian Milceni tribe, with whom they bordered in the west, were subjugated in 990 by the Margraviate of Meissen. From 1002 to 1031, the area was part of Piast-ruled Poland. In 1156, Holy Roman Emperor Frederick Barbarossa vested his ally, the Přemyslid duke Vladislaus II of Bohemia with the territory around Bautzen (Budissin), then called "Milsko", and after the 15th century called "Upper Lusatia".

Luban was granted Magdeburg rights between 1220 and 1230 in the course of the German Ostsiedlung. It was first mentioned in 1238. Like several other town foundings under the rule of the Přemyslid dynasty, owing to its favourable location on the historic Via Regia trade route close to the border with the Duchy of Silesia, Luban expanded rapidly. Since about 1253, Upper Lusatia temporarily had been under the rule of the Ascanian margraves John I and Otto III of Brandenburg. By the end of the 13th century, Luban's first brewery was founded by the Franciscans and cloth production flourished thanks to Flemish settlers. In 1297, a clothiers' uprising took place, which was brutally suppressed. Its two leaders were beheaded at the market square.

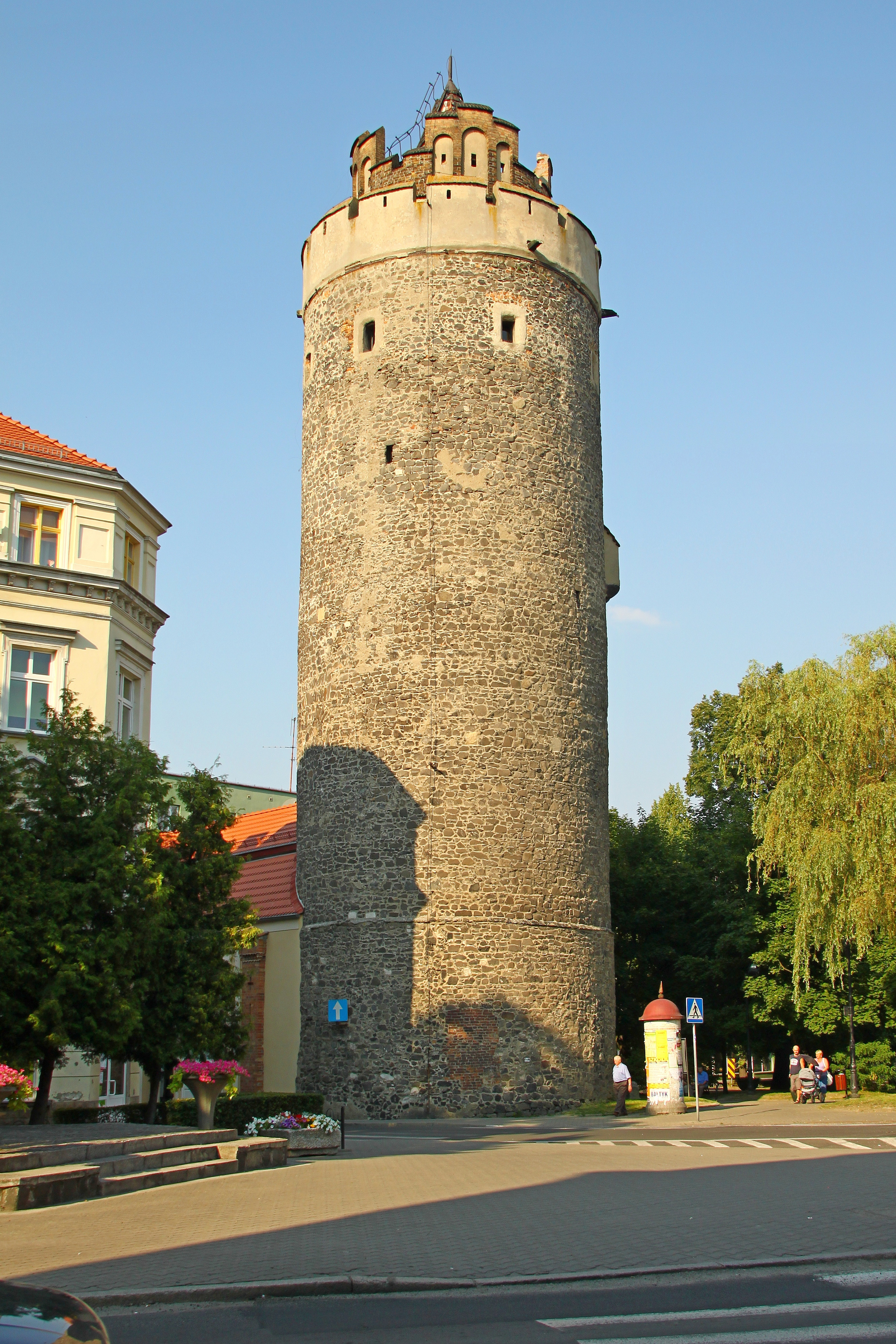
Bracka Tower

In 1319, the town became part of the Duchy of Jawor, the southwesternmost duchy of fragmented Piast-dynasty Poland. Duke Henry I of Jawor built a new town hall, the ruins of which can be seen today (Kramarska Tower). In 1320, he founded a Magdalene monastery in Lubań. He appointed a separate wójt for the town, which to that point administratively was subordinate to the wójt of Zgorzelec. The centre of the medieval town was a square marketplace with perpendicular streets, leading to four gates: Görlitzer Tor (Zgorzelecka) to the west, Brüdertor (Bracka), built in 1318 together with stone curtains by Duke Henry of Jawor, to the south, Nikolaitor (Mikołajska) to the east and Naumburger Tor (Nowogrodziecka) to the north. In the 1340s, the town was approached by False Waldemar, and the residents informed Henry I of this. Henry I then brought reinforcements and, to honor the town's loyalty, awarded it the coat of arms that is still in use today, depicting white crossed keys on a red and black field.

In 1346, the town passed to the Bohemian Crown. That same year, Luban, under the rule of Bohemian king Charles IV of Luxembourg, established the Lusatian League, together with the towns of Budissin (Upper Sorbian: Budyšin), Görlitz (Zhorjelc), Kamenz (Kamjenc), Löbau (Lubij) and Zittau (Žitawa). As a result, Luban obtained significant autonomy. Twice however, in 1427 and 1431, the Hussites completely demolished the town; it was quickly rebuilt. In its history, the town has repeatedly suffered great fires, which often ruined the whole town. Many inhabitants died as a result of plagues. In 1437, Bohemian King Sigismund exempted the town from taxes for 15 years.

In 1469, Luban became part of Hungary. In 1490, it became again part of the Kingdom of Bohemia, now ruled by the Jagiellonian dynasty, and after 1526 by the House of Habsburg. In 1498, Bohemian King Vladislaus II established an annual eight-day fair. The town revived, and bought several villages, especially under the Jagiellonian dynasty. In the 15th and 16th century, brewing prospered, with local beer being popular throughout Lusatia and Silesia, it was even served in the famous Piwnica Świdnicka in Breslau (Wrocław).

=== Modern era ===
In 1525, the Reformation was introduced in Lauban. In 1547, Lauban was subjected to the Upper Lusatian Pönfall, a punitive measure imposed by Ferdinand I in his capacity as King of Bohemia after political disobedience during the Schmalkaldic War, which resulted in the loss of self-governing privileges. In 1628, Bohemian military leader Albrecht von Wallenstein visited the town. With the Peace of Prague (1635), the Habsburg Emperor Ferdinand II in his capacity as Bohemian king passed Lusatia with the town to the Electorate of Saxony. As a result of the Thirty Years' War, the local economy collapsed, and in 1659, 1670 and 1696 the town was hit by fires.

Residents celebrated the election of Augustus II the Strong as king of Poland and the formation of the Polish-Saxon union in 1697. During Augustus II's visit to the town just before his royal coronation, a parade of the town's self-defense troops was held. With the union came prosperity. The town prospered due to linen and cloth production as well as trade in Polish oxen. Augustus II visited the town once again in 1721. The 1733 royal election of his son Augustus III of Poland was celebrated even more grandly, with five parades of municipal self-defense troops taking place. During the Seven Years' War, the Prussian occupiers imposed heavy contributions on the town.

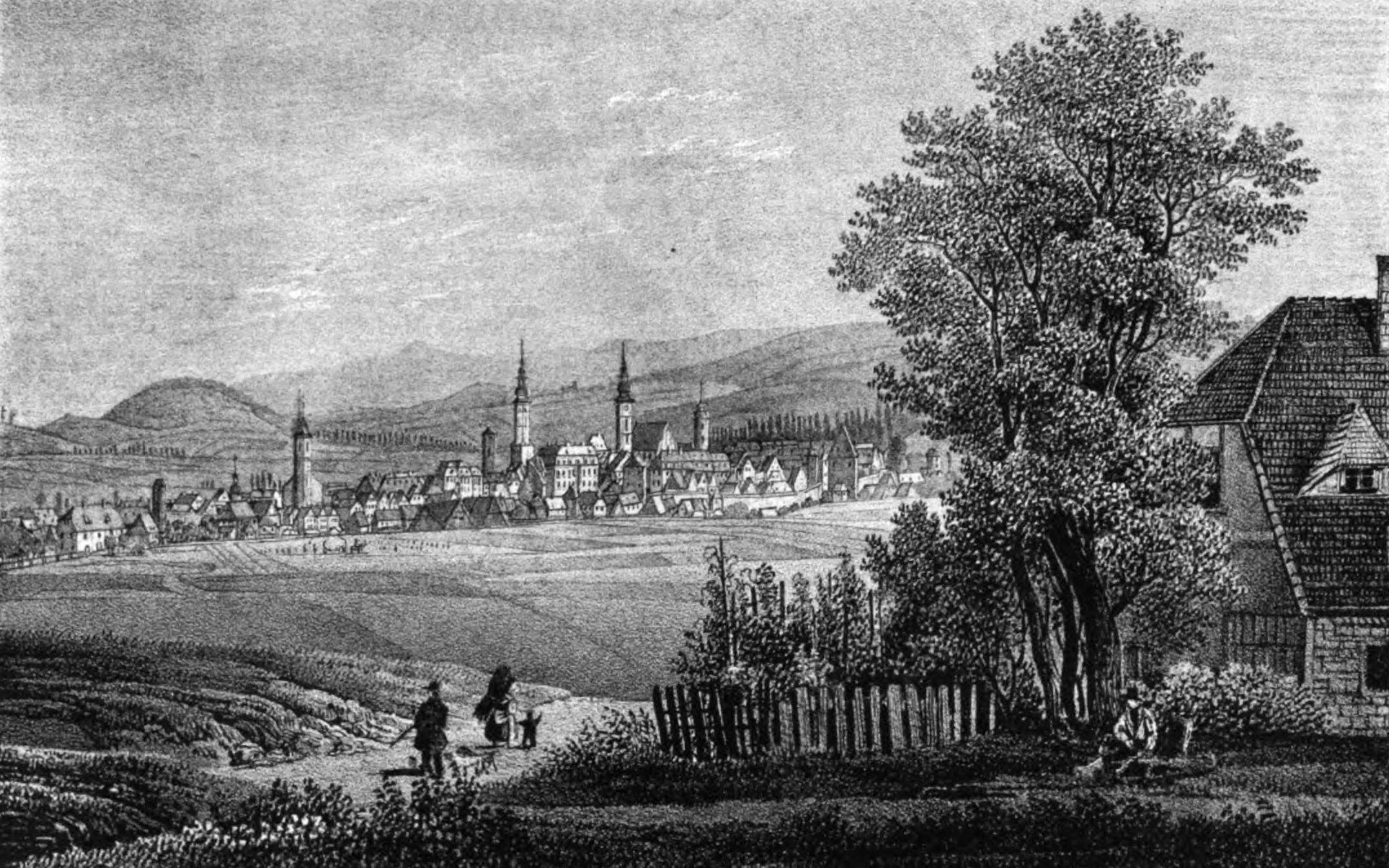
Early 19th-century view of the town

Following the Napoleonic Wars, in 1815 the Lusatian territory around Lauban and Görlitz fell to the Kingdom of Prussia after the Congress of Vienna and was incorporated into the Province of Silesia. Following the unification of Germany in 1871, the town became part of the German Empire.

In 1863, the town's gasworks were opened. Lauban gained railway connections to Görlitz and Hirschberg (Jelenia Góra) in 1865 and 1866. This was followed by the installation of a water distribution system in 1867 and a sewer system in 1870, with electrification beginning in 1894.

=== 20th century ===
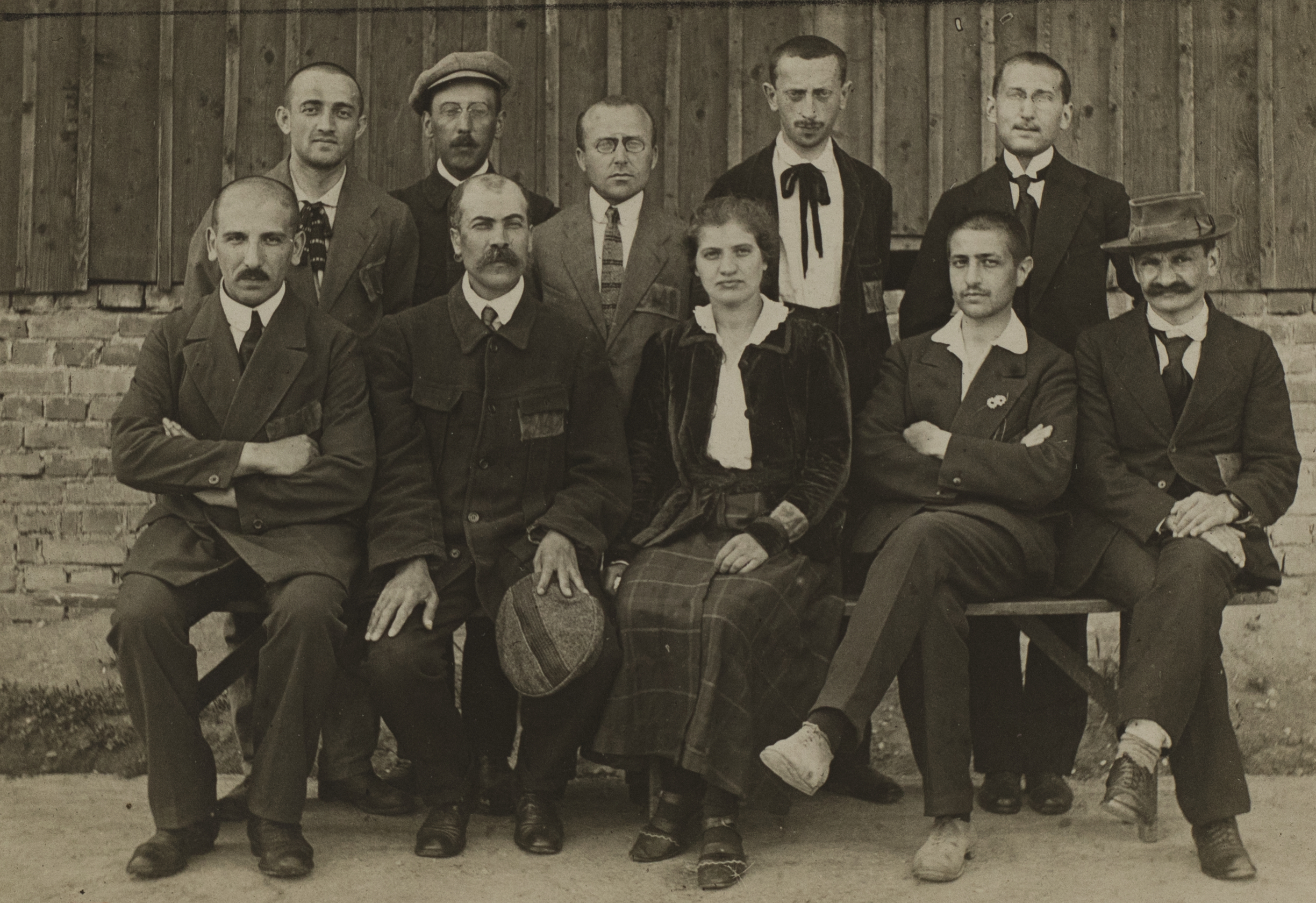
Bund leaders from Warsaw in Lauban detention camp, 1917

During World War I, Lauban was the site of a large prisoner-of-war camp, whose first prisoners, from September 1914, were soldiers of Imperial Russia, including Poles and Georgians conscripted into the Russian army (large parts of Polish and Georgian lands were under Russian rule before regaining independence by both countries in 1918). From 1915, French soldiers as well as political prisoners and common criminals were also imprisoned there. Among political prisoners were many Poles, including members of the underground Polish Military Organisation, National Democracy, Socialists, and members of Bund. The most famous prisoners were Aleksandra Szczerbińska, the future wife of the leader of interwar Poland Józef Piłsudski, and Stanisław Nowodworski, co-founder of the Christian National Party, future Polish Minister of Justice and Mayor of Warsaw. Józef Piłsudski and Aleksandra Piłsudska are today commemorated in Lubań with a memorial stone. The camp had many forced labour subcamps.

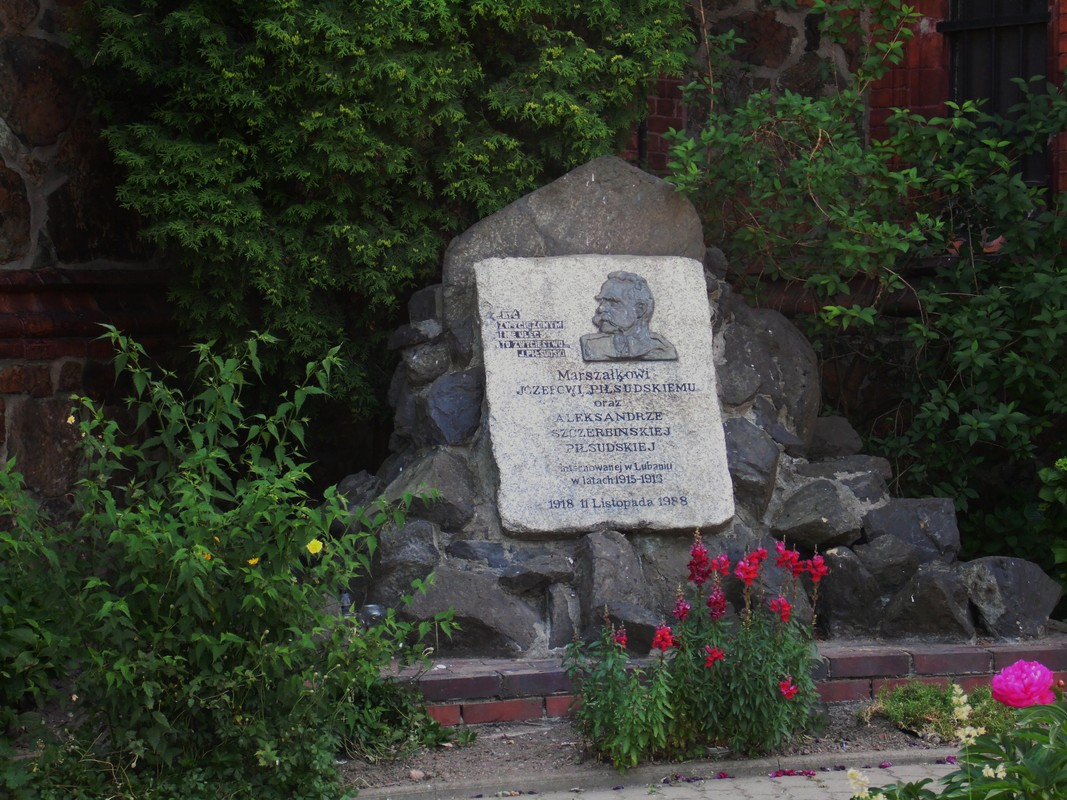
Memorial stone dedicated to Marshal of Poland Józef Piłsudski and his wife Aleksandra Piłsudska

During World War II, the Nazis created numerous forced labor camps in the town, the largest of which was Wohnheimlager GEMA, in which Polish and Russian women were imprisoned. Polish and Russian women were imprisoned also in other camps, as well as Russians, Hungarians, Frenchmen, Latvians and Ukrainians. There were five forced labor subcamps of the Stalag VIII-A prisoner-of-war camp, in which British, Yugoslavian, Soviet, Belgian, Polish and other Allied POWs were imprisoned, and the E231 forced labor subcamp of the Stalag VIII-B/344 POW camp in the present-day district of Księginki.

Lauban was the site of one of the last Nazi German victories in World War II. After it was taken in the Upper Silesian Offensive by the Red Army on 16 February 1945, the Wehrmacht successfully retook the town in a counterattack on 8 March 1945. After the war, the town was placed under the administration of the Polish People's Republic in accordance with the Potsdam Agreement and was renamed to its Polish name Lubań. In 1945–46, the remaining German inhabitants were expelled, also in accordance with the Potsdam Agreement, and the town was repopulated by Poles, including expellees from former eastern Poland, which was annexed by the Soviet Union. In the 1950s, Greeks, refugees of the Greek Civil War, settled in the town and its vicinity.

From 1975 to 1998 it was part of the former Jelenia Góra Voivodeship. Between 1992 and 2004, the Market Square was renovated. Streets were paved and town houses around the Kramarska Tower were rebuilt.

In 2001, the Training Centre for Working Dogs of the Border Guard of Poland was relocated to Lubań, and in 2010, the Specialised Training Centre of the Border Guard of Poland was established in its place.

== Economy ==
There are the following workplaces in Lubań:

- Przedsiębiorstwo Energetyki Cieplnej (PEC Lubań Sp. z o.o.)
- Agromet ZEHS Lubań
- Imakon Sp. z o.o.
- „IMKA" Dr. Schumacher Sp. z o.o.
- Chromex Sp. z o.o.
- Automatec Sp. z o.o.

There are also the following notable companies:

- Lubańskie Przedsiębiorstwo Wodociągów i Kanalizacji Sp. z o.o. Lubań
- Lubańskie Towarzystwo Budownictwa Społecznego Sp. z o.o. Lubań
- Przedsiębiorstwo Energetyki Cieplnej Sp. z o.o. Lubań
- Zakład Gospodarki i Usług Komunalnych Sp. z o.o. Lubań

In terms of entertainment and consumption, the town offers clubs, restaurants, swimming pools, a cinema and a small modern shopping centre.

== Culture ==
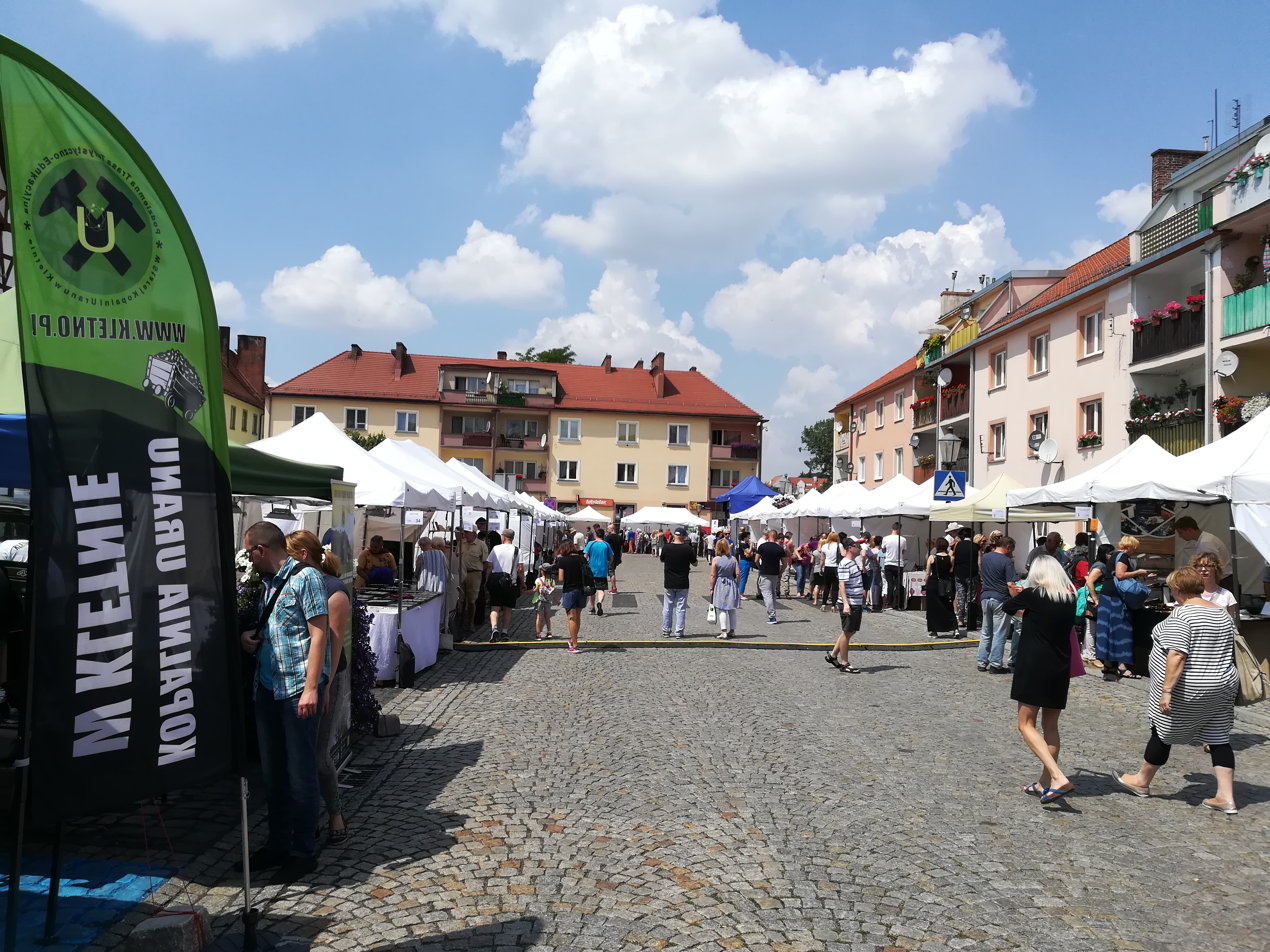
Sudetes Festival of Minerals in Lubań in 2018

Lubań is the hub of culture in the Lubań Municipality. The town has a cultural centre (Dom Kultury). There is also a regional museum.

Lubań is a stop on the Polish sections of the Way of St. James pilgrimage route.

== Education ==
Lubań has five kindergartens, five primary schools, and three secondary schools.

The Adam Mickiewicz Post-Primary School Complex (Zespół Szkół Ponadpodstawowych im. Adama Mickiewicza w Lubaniu) is ranked amongst the best secondary schools in the entire Lower Silesian Voivodeship.

== Health care ==
Lubań has a hospital, the Lucjan Kopeć Lusatian Medical Centre (Łużyckie Centrum Medyczne im. Lucjana Kopcia).

== Transport ==
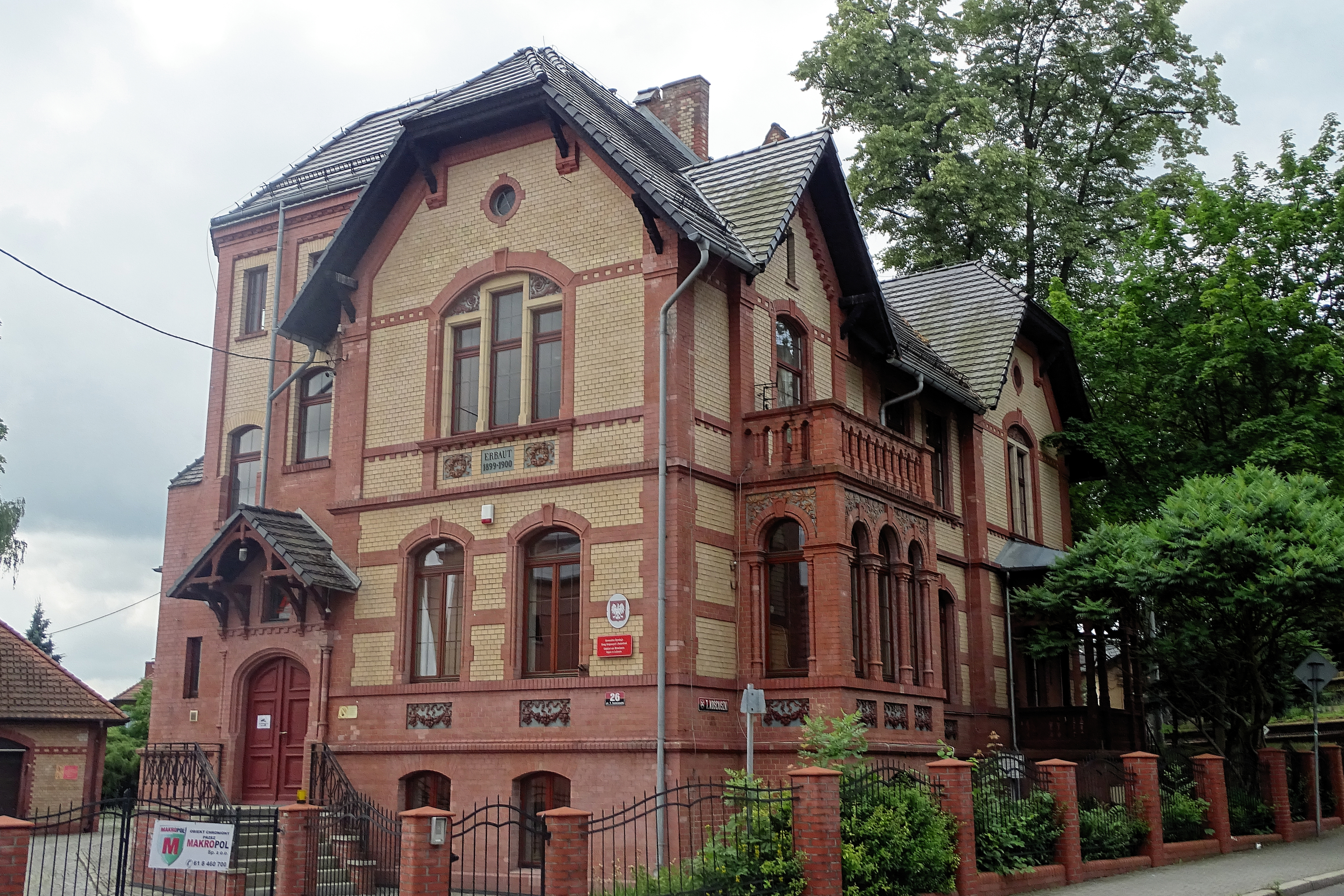
Seat of the local branch of the General Directorate for National Roads and Motorways

=== Rail ===
The town is served by Lubań Śląski railway station. It is operated by Lower Silesian Railways with regional services to Zgorzelec, Görlitz, Jelenia Góra, and Wrocław (via Węgliniec).

=== Road ===
The Polish national road 30, and Voivodeship roads 296, 357, 393 pass through the town. A public transport system has served the town since 2011.

== Sights ==
Historic sights of Lubań (examples)

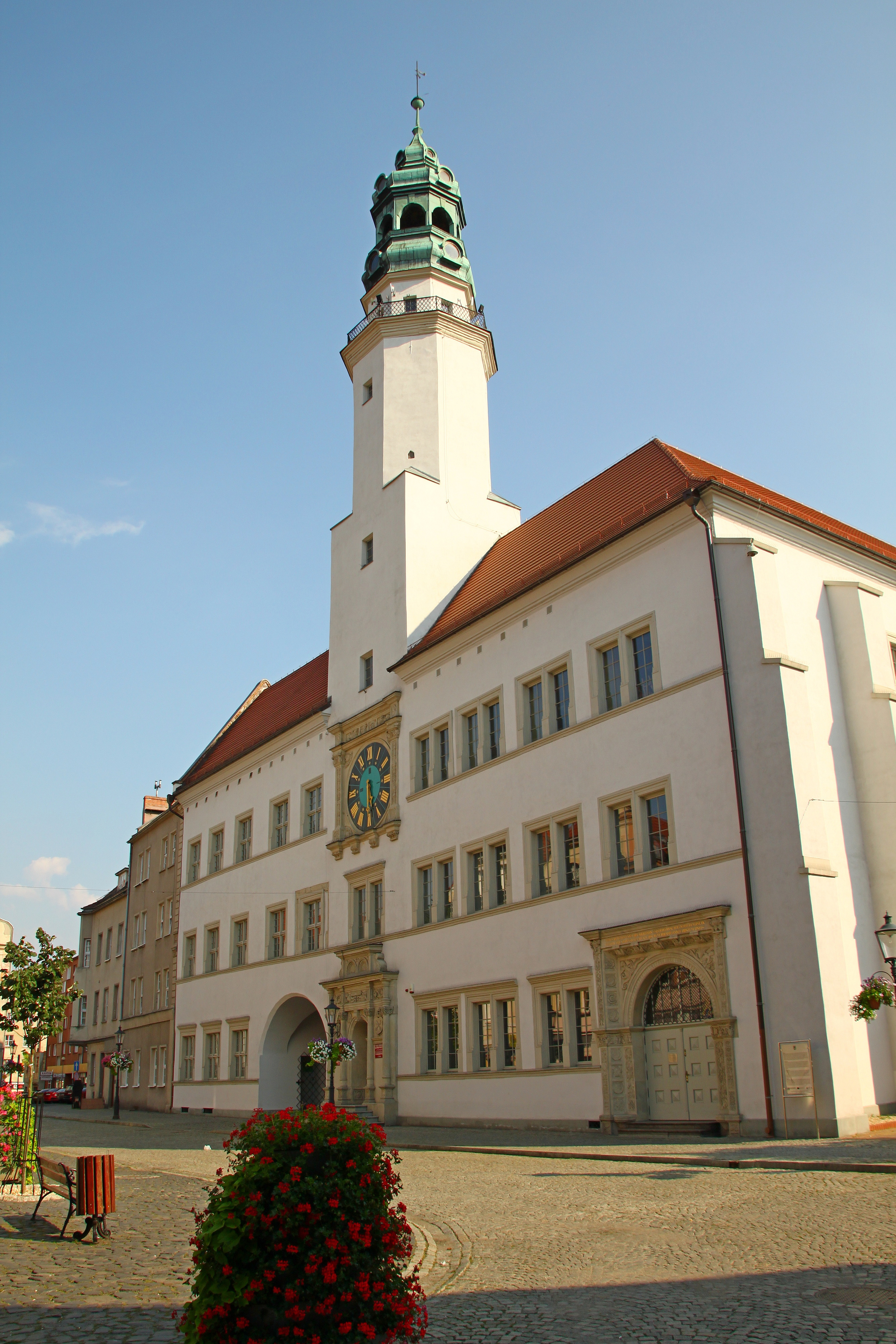
Town hall

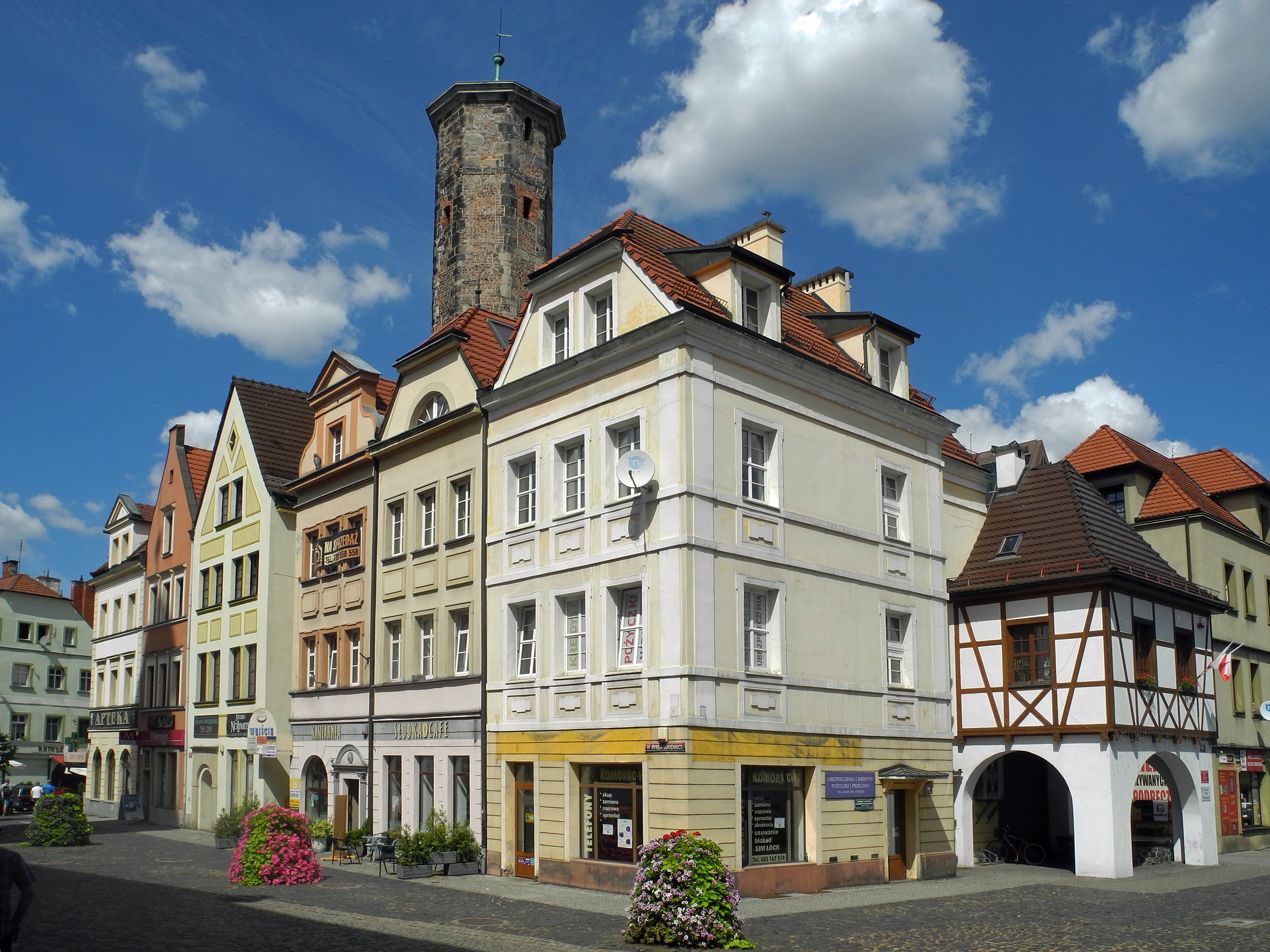
Market Square with Kramarska Tower

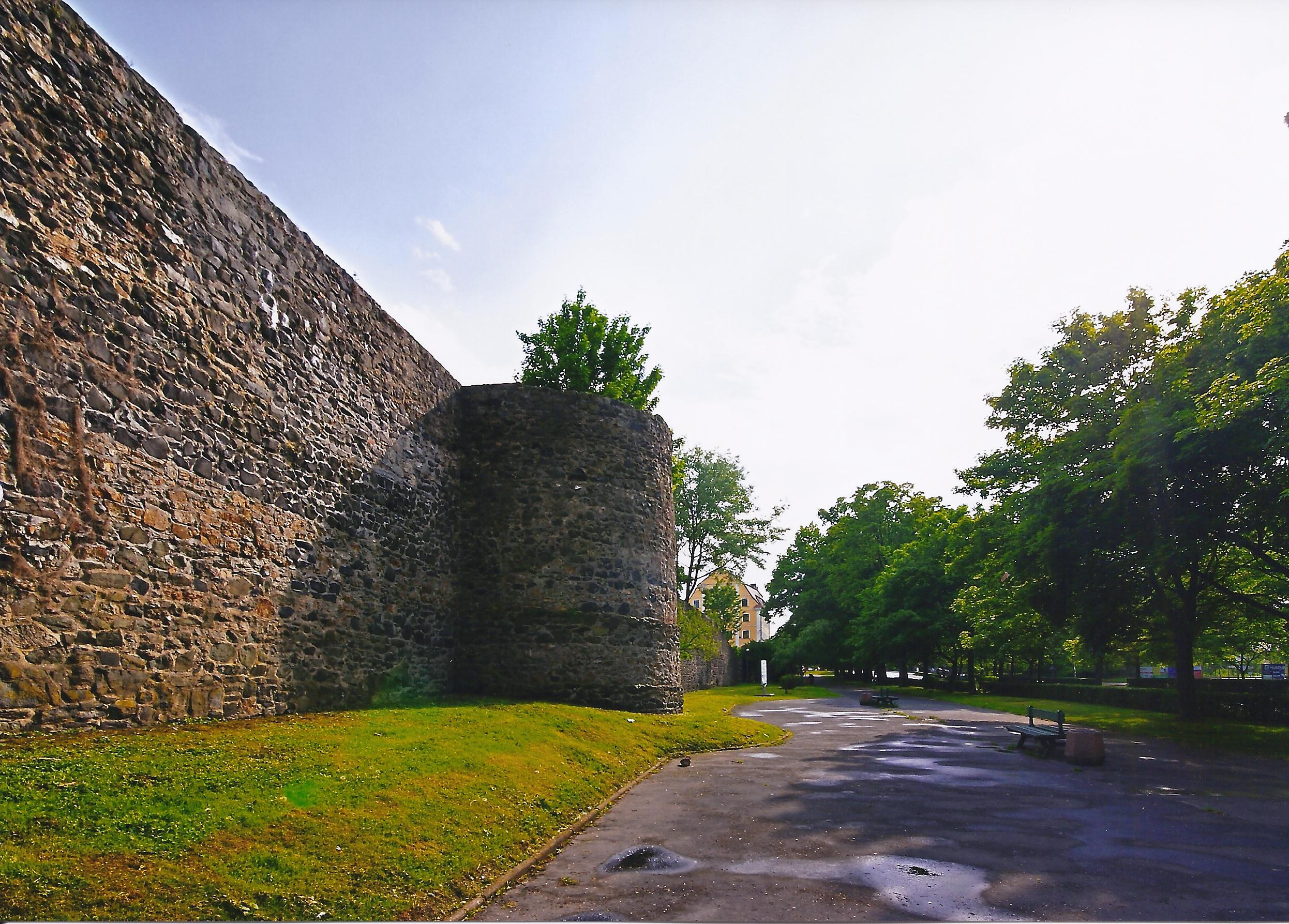
Medieval defensive walls

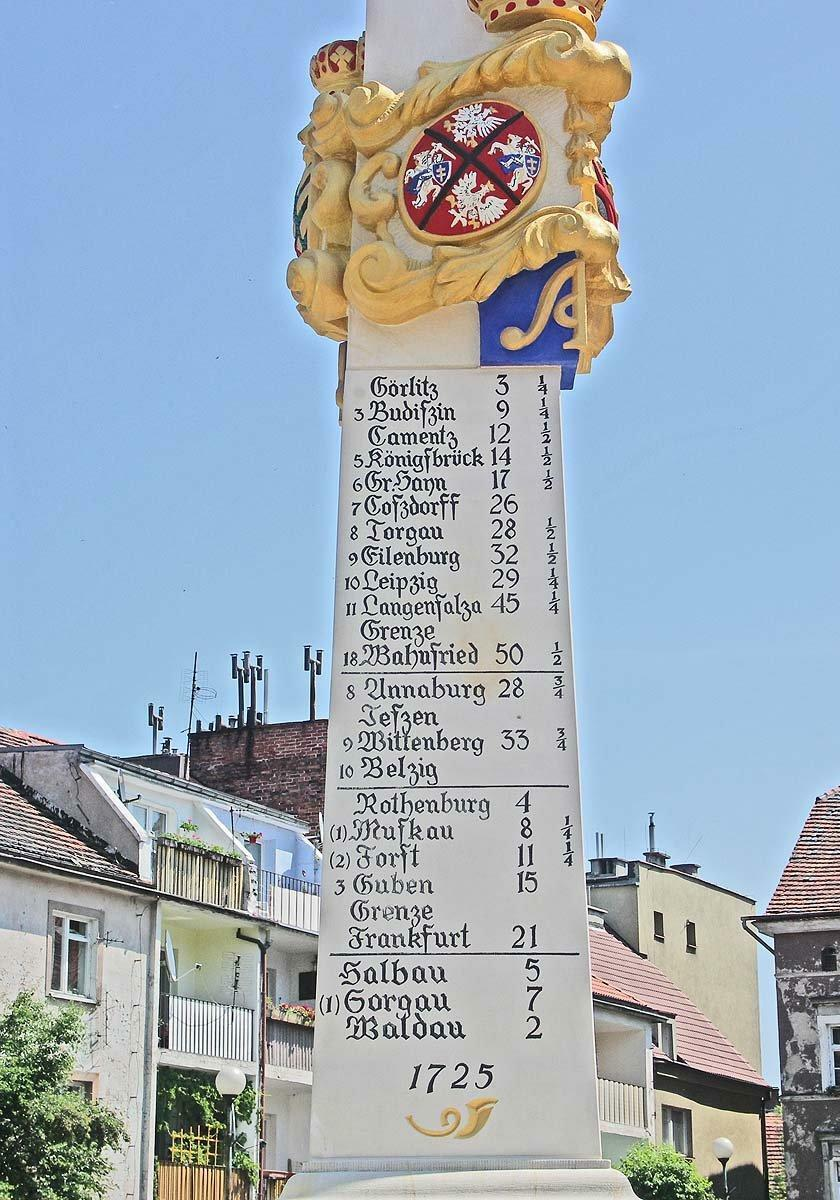
Polish–Saxon post milestone

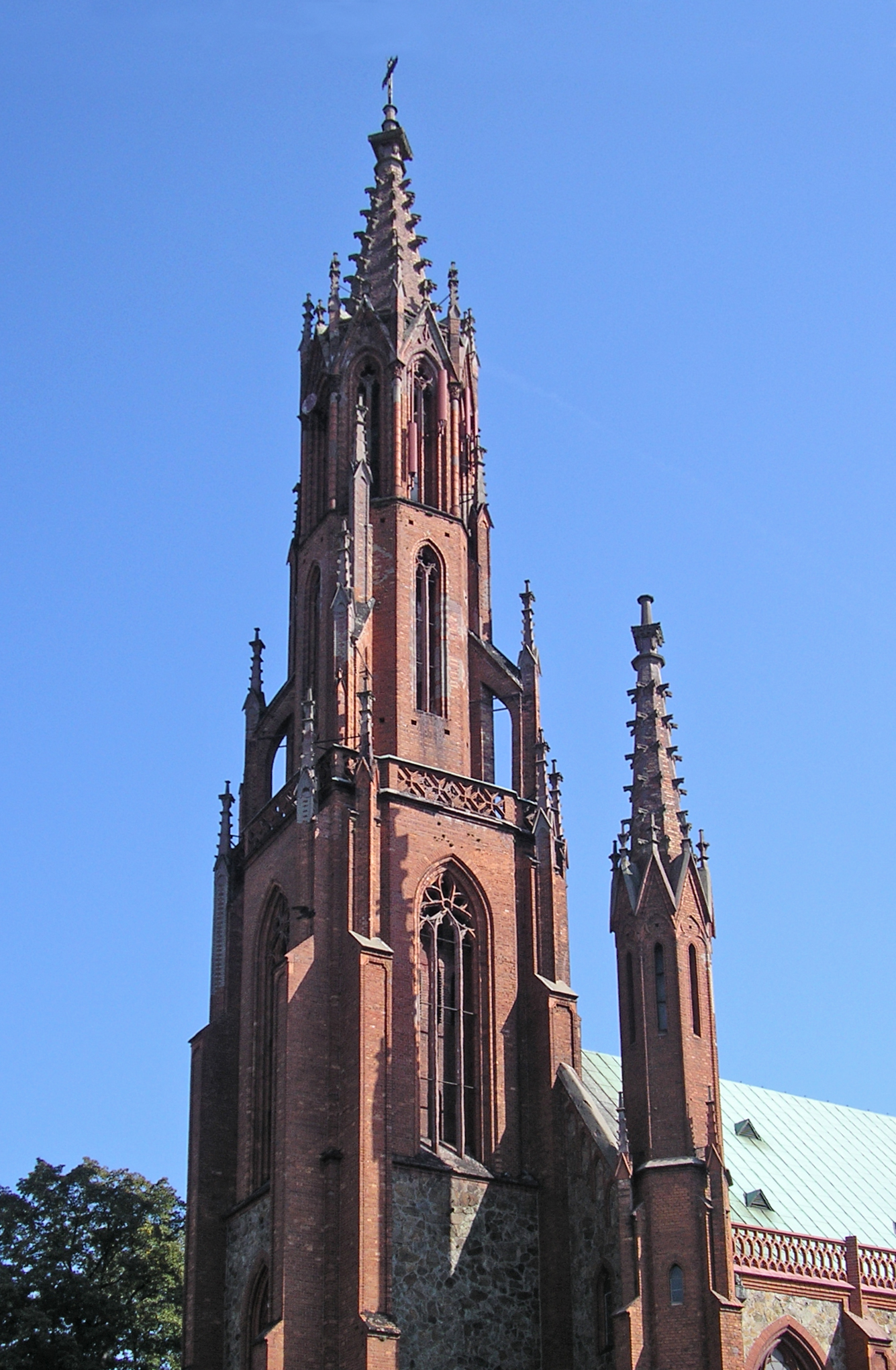
Holy Trinity church

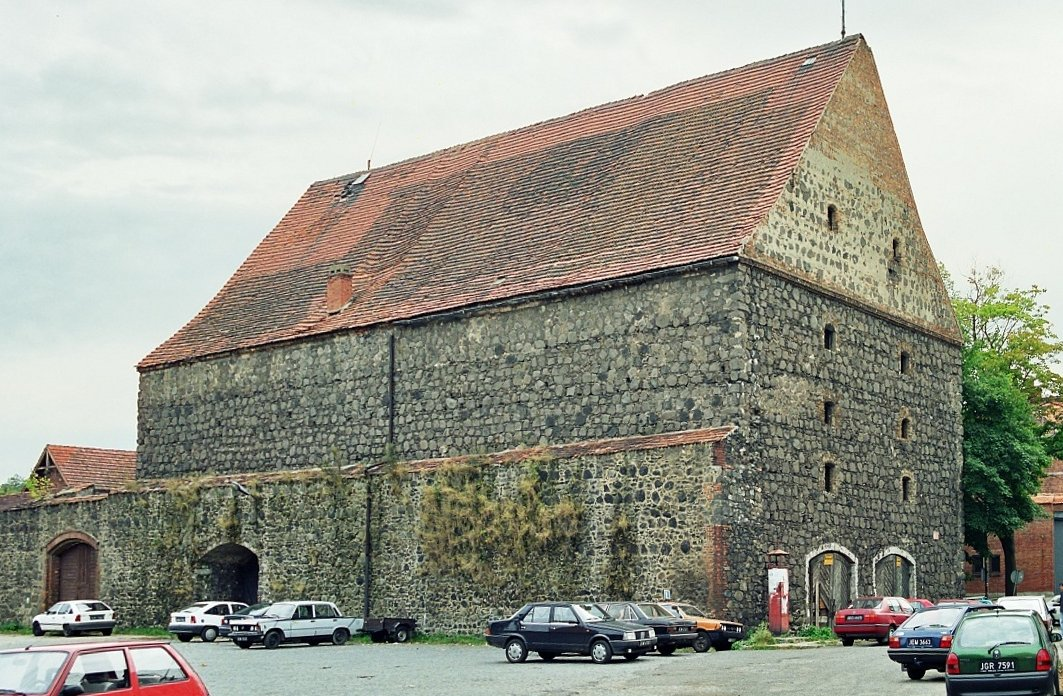
Salt House

Points of interest in Lubań include:

- Kramarska Tower – remains of the 13th-century Gothic town hall
- Stone curtains (1318), made from basalt from a local quarry. Behind the curtains were situated four main gates: Nowogrodziecka, Mikołajska, Bracka and Zgorzelecka
- Bracka Donjon, built in 1318 by Duke Henry I of Jawor
- Trynitarska Tower (1320 r.) on Wrocławska street, a remnant of Holy Trinity Church
- Salt House or Cereal House (Polish: Dom Solny/Dom Zbożowy) from 1539, a building made of basalt
- Town hall, built 1539–1543, in a Renaissance style, housing the Regional Museum (Muzeum Regionalne)
- Polish–Saxon post milestone from 1725 at the Market Square
- House under the Ship (Polish: Dom pod Okrętem) (1715), the house of the Kirchoff family, now a tax office
- Park on Kamienna Góra hill (14 hectares). Contains evidence of an extinct Tertiary volcano, such as basalt columns or "volcanic bombs"; also has a wood with exotic trees: Liriodendron tulipifera, Pinus pinea, Pinus nigra. Kamienna Góra also has an amphitheatre and a castle-style residence, which was built in 1824 and rebuilt in 1909, offering views of the Sudetes mountains (including Śnieżka, the highest peak).
- A memorial stone dedicated to the Marshal of Poland Józef Piłsudski and his wife Aleksandra Piłsudska
- Gothic Revival Holy Trinity church
- Building of the former Latin school, built 1588–1591, now housing municipal offices
- Monastery of Sisters of St. Mary Magdalene of Penitence

== Notable people ==
- Adriana Achcińska, football player
- Helmut Bakaitis, actor
- Jakob Bartsch, astronomer
- Martin Behm, Lutheran pastor, writer
- Albert Brux, Wehrmacht officer
- Karl Hanke, NSDAP-Politician
- Angelika Jakubowska, model
- Heinz Kessler, general, politician
- Jacek Dewódzki, musician
- Agnieszka Stanuch, slalom canoer
- Axel Ullrich, cancer researcher
- Friedrich Wilhelm Alexander von Mechow, explorer of Africa
- Zuzanna Efimienko, volleyball player

== Twin towns – sister cities ==
Lubań is twinned with:

- Kamenz, Germany
- Kolín, Czech Republic
- Königsbrück, Germany
- Löbau, Germany
- Prienai, Lithuania
