= List of viperine species and subspecies =

This is a list of all genera, species and subspecies of the subfamily Viperinae, otherwise referred to as viperines, true vipers, pitless vipers or Old World vipers. It follows the taxonomy of McDiarmid et al. (1999) and ITIS.

- Atheris, Bush vipers
  - Atheris acuminata
  - Atheris anisolepis
  - Atheris barbouri, Uzungwe mountain bush viper
  - Atheris broadleyi
  - Atheris ceratophora, Horned bush viper
  - Atheris chlorechis, Western bush viper
  - Atheris desaixi, Mount Kenya bush viper
  - Atheris hetfieldi
  - Atheris hirsuta, Tai hairy bush viper
  - Atheris hispida, Bristly bush viper
  - Atheris katangensis, Katanga mountain bush viper
  - Atheris mabuensis, Mount Mabu forest viper
  - Atheris matildae, Matilda's horned viper
  - Atheris mongoensis
  - Atheris nitschei, Great Lakes bush viper
  - Atheris rungweensis, Rungwe tree viper
  - Atheris squamigera, Rough-scaled bush viper
  - Atheris subocularis
- Bitis, Puff adders
  - Bitis albanica, Albany adder
  - Bitis arietans, Common puff adder
    - Bitis arietans arietans, Common puff adder
    - Bitis arietans somalica, Somali puff adder
  - Bitis armata, Southern adder
  - Bitis atropos, Mountain adder
  - Bitis caudalis, Horned adder
  - Bitis cornuta, Many-horned adder
  - Bitis gabonica, Gaboon viper (3003 Viper)
    - Bitis gabonica, East African gaboon viper
  - Bitis harenna
  - Bitis heraldica, Angolan adder
  - Bitis inornata, Plain mountain adder
  - Bitis nasicornis, Rhinoceros viper
  - Bitis parviocula, Ethiopian viper
  - Bitis peringueyi, Peringuey's desert adder
  - Bitis rhinoceros, West African gaboon viper
  - Bitis rubida, Red adder
  - Bitis schneideri, Namaqua dwarf adder
  - Bitis worthingtoni, Kenyan horned viper
  - Bitis xeropaga, Desert mountain adder
- Causus, night adders
  - Causus bilineatus, lined night adder, two-striped night adder
  - Causus defilippii, snouted night adder
  - Causus lichtensteinii, forest night adder
  - Causus maculatus, forest rhombic night adder, West African night adder
  - Causus rasmusseni
  - Causus resimus, green night adder
  - Causus rhombeatus, rhombic night adder
- Cerastes, Horned vipers
  - Cerastes boehmeii Tunesian horned viper
  - Cerastes cerastes, Saharan horned viper
  - Cerastes gasperettii, Arabian horned viper
  - Cerastes vipera, Sahara sand viper
- Daboia
  - Daboia mauritanica, Moorish viper
  - Daboia palaestinae, Palestine viper
  - Daboia russelii, Russell's viper
  - Daboia siamensis, Eastern Russell's viper
- Echis, Saw-scaled vipers
  - Echis borkini
  - Echis carinatus, Saw-scaled viper
    - Echis carinatus astolae, Astola saw-scaled viper
    - Echis carinatus carinatus, South Indian saw-scaled viper
    - Echis carinatus multisquamatus, Central Asian saw-scaled viper
    - Echis carinatus sinhaleyus, Sri Lankan saw-scaled viper
    - Echis carinatus sochureki, Sochurek's saw-scaled viper
  - Echis coloratus, Painted saw-scaled viper
  - Echis hughesi, Hughes' saw-scaled viper
  - Echis jogeri, Joger's saw-scaled viper
  - Echis khosatzkii
  - Echis leucogaster, White-bellied saw-scaled viper
  - Echis megalocephalus, Cherlin's saw-scaled viper
  - Echis ocellatus, West African saw-scaled viper
  - Echis omanensis, Oman saw-scaled viper
  - Echis pyramidum, Egyptian saw-scaled viper
    - Echis pyramidum aliaborri, Red carpet viper
    - Echis pyramidum leakeyi, Kenyan carpet viper
    - Echis pyramidum pyramidum, Egyptian saw-scaled viper
  - Echis romani
- Eristicophis, McMahon's desert viper
  - Eristicophis macmahonii, McMahon's desert viper
- Macrovipera, Large Palearctic vipers
  - Macrovipera lebetina, Blunt-nosed viper
    - Macrovipera lebetina cernovi
    - Macrovipera lebetina lebetina, Blunt-nosed viper
    - Macrovipera lebetina obtusa, West-Asian blunt-nosed viper
    - Macrovipera lebetina transmediterranea
    - Macrovipera lebetina turanica, Turan blunt-nosed viper
  - Macrovipera razii
  - Macrovipera schweizeri, Milos viper
  - Montatheris hindii, Montane viper
- Montivipera
  - Montivipera albizona, Central Turkish mountain viper
  - Montivipera bornmuelleri, Lebanon viper (Endangered)
  - Montivipera bulgardaghica, Mount Bulgar viper
  - Montivipera kuhrangica, Kuhrang mountain viper
  - Montivipera latifii, Latifi's viper
  - Montivipera raddei, Rock viper
    - Montivipera raddei albicornuta, Iranian mountain viper
    - Montivipera raddei kurdistanica , Kurdistan viper
  - Montivipera wagneri, Ocellated mountain viper
  - Montivipera xanthina, Rock viper
- Proatheris, Lowland swamp viper
  - Proatheris superciliaris, Lowland swamp viper
- Pseudocerastes
  - Pseudocerastes fieldi, Field's horned viper
  - Pseudocerastes persicus, Persian horned viper
  - Pseudocerastes urarachnoides, Iranian spider viper
- Vipera, Palearctic vipers
  - Vipera altaica , Kazachstan viper
  - Vipera ammodytes, Sand viper
    - Vipera ammodytes ammodytes, Western sand viper
    - Vipera ammodytes gregorwallneri
    - Vipera ammodytes meridionalis, Eastern sand viper
    - Vipera ammodytes montandoni, Transdanubian sand viper
  - Vipera anatolica , Anatolian viper (critically endangered)
  - Vipera aspis, Asp viper
    - Vipera aspis aspis, European asp
    - Vipera aspis atra, Black asp
    - Vipera aspis francisciredi, Central Italian asp
    - Vipera aspis hugyi, Southern Italian asp
    - Vipera aspis zinnikeri, Gascony asp
  - Vipera barani, Baran's adder
  - Vipera berus, common viper, adder
    - Vipera berus berus, Common European adder
    - Vipera berus bosniensis, Balkan cross adder
    - Vipera berus sachalinensis, Sakhalin Island adder
  - Vipera darevskii, Darevsky's viper
  - Vipera dinniki, Dinnik's viper
  - Vipera ebneri , Iranian Mountain steppe viper
  - Vipera eriwanensis, Armenian steppe viper
  - Vipera graeca, Greek meadow viper
  - Vipera kaznakovi, Caucasus viper
  - Vipera latastei, Lataste's viper
    - Vipera latastei gaditana
    - Vipera latastei latastei, Lataste's viper
  - Vipera lotievi, Caucasian meadow viper
  - Vipera magnifica, Magnificent viper
  - Vipera monticola, Atlas mountain viper
  - Vipera nikolskii, Nikolski's viper
  - Vipera olguni
  - Vipera orlovi, Orlov's viper (critically Endangered)
  - Vipera pontica, Pontic adder, Black sea viper
  - Vipera renardi, Steppe viper
    - Vipera renardi renardi
    - Vipera renardi parursini
  - Vipera renardi tienshanica, Kasackstan steppe viper
  - Vipera seoanei, Baskian viper
    - Vipera seoanei cantabrica
    - Vipera seoanei seoanei, Baskian viper
  - Vipera shemakhensis
  - Vipera transcaucasiana, Transcaucasian longnose viper
  - Vipera ursinii, Meadow vipers
    - Vipera ursinii macrops, Albanian meadow viper
    - Vipera ursinii moldavica, Romanian meadow viper
    - Vipera ursinii rakosiensis, Hungarian meadow viper
    - Vipera ursinii wettsteini, Provence meadow viper
    - Vipera ursinii ursini , Italian meadow viper
  - Vipera walser, Piemont viper
