= Wildlife of the Democratic Republic of the Congo =

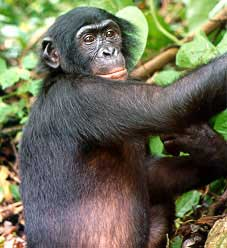
The Democratic Republic of the Congo is the only country in the world in which bonobos are found in the wild.

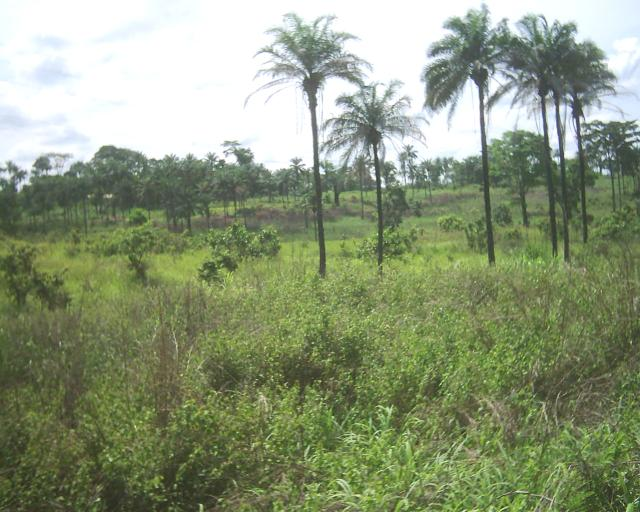
Bas-Congo landscape

The wildlife of the Democratic Republic of the Congo includes its flora and fauna, comprising a large biodiversity in rainforests, seasonally flooded forests and grasslands.

The country is considered one of the 17 megadiverse nations, and is one of the most flora rich countries on the African continent. Its rainforests harbour many rare and endemic species, such as the chimpanzee and the bonobo. It is home for more than 10,000 types of plants, 600 timber species, as well as 1,000 bird species, 280 reptile species, and 400 mammal species, including the forest elephant, gorilla, forest buffalo, bongo, and okapi. Many of these wildlife species are threatened animals such as large lowland gorillas and chimpanzees.

Five of the country's national parks are listed as World Heritage Sites: the Garumba, Kahuzi-Biega, Salonga and Virunga National Parks, and Okapi Wildlife Reserve. All five sites are listed by UNESCO as World Heritage In Danger.

Several environmental issues in the DRC threaten wildlife, including overhunting for bushmeat, deforestation, mining and armed conflict. The civil war and resultant poor economic conditions have endangered much of the country's biodiversity. Many park wardens were either killed or could not afford to continue their work.

== Fauna ==
The ecoregion is home to the endangered western lowland gorilla (Gorilla gorilla gorilla), the endangered eastern lowland gorilla (Gorilla berengei graueri), the endangered mountain gorilla (gorilla beringei beringei), African forest elephant (Loxodonta cyclotis), and okapi (Okapia johnstoni).

Animals native to the Democratic Republic of the Congo:

- Aardvark
- African brush-tailed porcupine
- African buffalo
- African bullfrog
- African civet
- African clawed frog
- African dwarf frog
- African golden cat
- African helmeted turtle
- African leopard
- African manatee
- African palm civet
- African rock python
- African soft-furred rat
- African softshell turtle
- African striped weasel
- African tree toad
- Allen's swamp monkey
- Angola colobus
- Aubry's flapshell turtle
- Ball python
- Banded mongoose
- Banded water cobra
- Bili ape
- Black-and-white colobus
- Black-collared lovebird
- Black mamba
- Black-necked spitting cobra
- Blue duiker
- Blue-headed wood dove
- Blue monkey
- Bohor reedbuck
- Bongo
- Bonobo
- Bushpig
- Cape bushbuck
- Cape hyrax
- Central African oyan
- Chameleon
- Chimpanzee
- Common agama
- Common duiker
- Common egg eater
- Common eland
- Congo peafowl
- Congo water cobra
- Crocodile
  - Dwarf crocodile
  - Nile crocodile
  - Central African slender-snouted crocodile
- De Brazza's monkey
- Egyptian fruit bat
- African forest elephant
- Western gorilla
- Gaboon viper
- Gallagher's free-tailed bat
- Giant eland
- Giant forest hog
- Giant otter shrew
- Goliath beetle
- Grant's zebra
- Greater cane rat
- Greater kudu
- Great Lakes bush viper
- Green bush viper
- Green mamba
- Grey parrot
- Handsome spurfowl
- Hartebeest
- Hedgehog leaf-toed gecko
- Hippopotamus
- Honey badger
- Jameson's mamba
- Johnston's chameleon
- Katanga Mountain bush viper
- Kob
- Kordofan giraffe
- Leopard tortoise
- Lesser flamingo
- Lichtenstein's hartebeest
- Lion
- Many-banded snake
- Marabou stork
- Marsh mongoose
- Monitor lizard
  - Angolan white-throated monitor
  - Nile monitor
  - Savannah monitor
- Moustached monkey
- Northern white rhinoceros
- Okapi
- Olive baboon
- Oribi
- Pangolin
  - Giant pangolin
  - Long-tailed pangolin
  - Tree pangolin
- Patas monkey
- Puff adder
- Puku
- Red river hog
- Roan antelope
- Rock hyrax
- Rough-scaled bush viper
- Sable antelope
- Serval
- Side-striped jackal
- Sitatunga
- Southern reedbuck
- Spectral pygmy chameleon
- Spotted hyena
- Strange-horned chameleon
- Stuhlmann's golden mole
- Topi
- Tropical spiny agama
- Trumpeter hornbill
- Upemba lechwe
- Upemba mud turtle
- Warthog
- Waterbuck
- Yellow-backed duiker

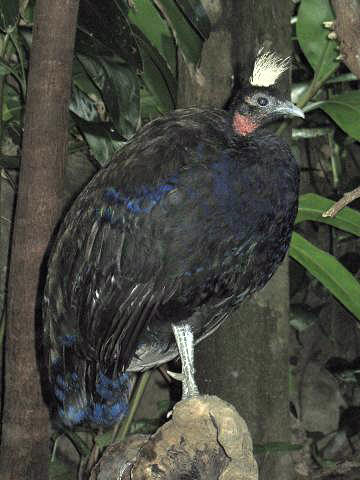
Congo peafowl

=== Ants ===
There are 803 species of ant confirmed in the DRC, including the highly invasive ant Pheidole megacephala which originates from the country.

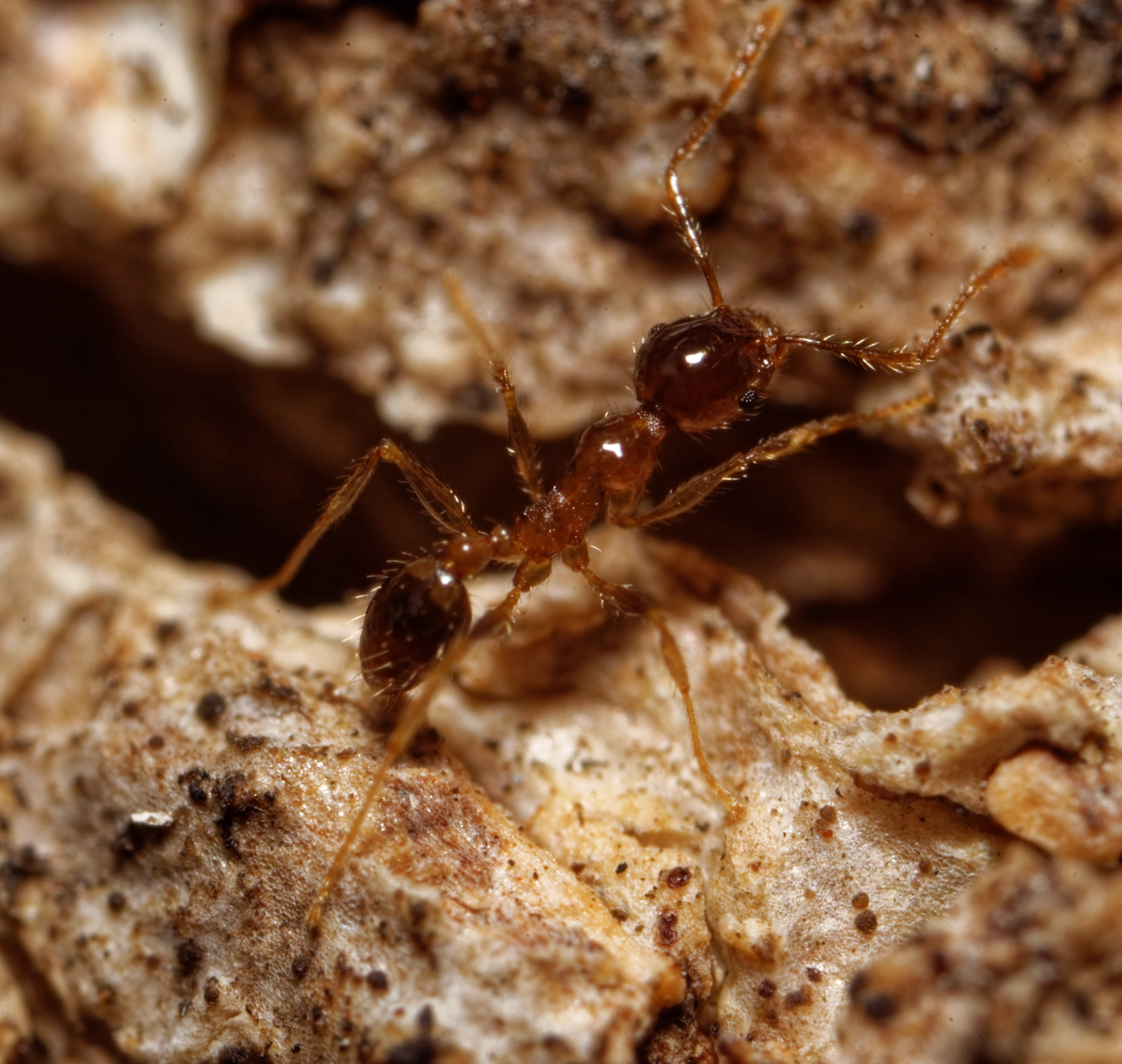
A Pheidole megacephala minor worker, a species of ant native to the DRC.

== See also ==
- Centre National d'Appui au Développement et à la Participation populaire
- Acapoeta tanganicae
- Labeo simpsoni
