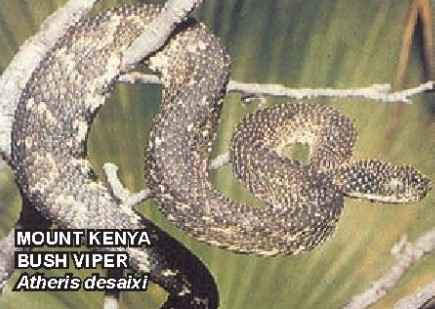

Conservation status
- Endangered (IUCN 3.1)
- CITES Appendix II (CITES)

Scientific classification
- Kingdom: Animalia
- Phylum: Chordata
- Class: Reptilia
- Order: Squamata
- Suborder: Serpentes
- Family: Viperidae
- Genus: Atheris
- Species: A. desaixi

Binomial name
- Atheris desaixi Ashe, 1968

= Atheris desaixi =

Species of snake

Atheris desaixi, commonly known as the Mount Kenya bush viper, Ashe's bush viper, or Desaix's bush viper, is a venomous species of viper endemic to Kenya, where only two isolated populations are known. It is known for its striking black and yellow coloration. No subspecies are currently recognized.

== Etymology ==
This species, A. desaixi, is named in honor of Frank DeSaix, an American Peace Corps volunteer who collected the first specimen.

== Description ==
Adults of A. desaixi average 40–60 cm (about 16-24 inches) in total length (including tail), with a maximum total length of 70 cm (28 in). Newborns measure 17–22 cm (6.5–8.5 in) in total length. In Ashe's original 1968 description, adults were reported to grow to an average 49–68 cm (about 19-27 inches) total length, with a head and body length of 43–59 cm (17–23 in) and a tail length of 6–9 cm (2.4–3.5 in).

The eyes are set well forward in the head and are surrounded by 14–17 scales. Interorbital scales number 8–11. The eye is separated from the nasal by two to three scales and from the supralabials by two. Upper labials: 10–12. Sublabials: 11–14. The rostral scale is not as wide as it is long, while its upper margin is highest at the center. The rostral is also accompanied by an even number of suprarostrals. The superciliary scales above the eyes are not enlarged (as opposed to A. ceratophora). The nasal scale is round and single, or partially divided.

Midbody, the dorsal scale rows number 24–31. The dorsal scales are short and heavily keeled. However, on the upper dorsals the keels terminate before the end of each scale. On the lower dorsals, the keels are serrated (like in Echis). The ventral scale count is 160–174. In females the subcaudals number 41–54. One male specimen had 53 subcaudals.

The color pattern consists of a greenish-black to charcoal-black ground color, while each scale is tipped with yellow or yellowish-green, giving the animal a speckled appearance. Some scales have more of this color to them and form a series of loops along the sides of the body. These loops may fuse into zigzag patterns posteriorly, fading again on the tail. Anteriorly, the venter is yellow or yellowish, fading towards a purplish-black towards the rear and under the tail, except for the tip that is blotched with yellow. Juveniles are mainly yellow with a white tipped tail. This darkens as they grow until they reach the adult color phase at a total length of about 30 cm (12 in).

== Distribution and habitat ==
There are two isolated populations of A. desaixi in Kenya: one in the forests at Chuka, south-eastern Mount Kenya, and the other near Igembe in the northern Nyambeni range. The type locality is listed as "near Chuka, Lat. 0° 20' S, Long. 37° 35' E, in rain forest at an altitude of c. 1,600 meters [5,200 feet]", Kenya.

The original specimens, for which field notes were taken, were found in dense rain forest at 1,600 m (5,200 ft), collected in clearings and along pathways in the dense foliage about 2 m (6.6 ft) above the ground. The conditions were very humid and all specimens were collected within a 1.6 km (0.99 mi) radius. In this environment, their coloration offers them an excellent camouflage, making them very difficult to spot.

== Behavior ==
Little is known of the behavior of A. desaixi. It is obviously arboreal, moving slowly and deliberately among the branches of its habitat as other Atheris species do, but it is unknown when daily peak activity occurs. In captivity, it is just as willing to accept food during the day as at night.

When captured, it will strike readily and struggle vigorously in the hand. It may also perform a characteristic, stridulating threat display, in which counterlooped coils and the lower serrated, keeled scales are rubbed against one another to produce a loud hissing noise. However, captive specimens soon calm down and this behavior is lost.

=== Feeding ===
A. desaixi is reported to be an opportunist, preying on amphibians, rodents and small birds.

=== Reproduction ===
A gravid female specimen of A. desaixi found in the Nyambeni range is reported to have given birth to 13 offspring in the month of August. Newborns measured 17–21 cm (6.7–8.3 in) in total length.

== Interactions with humans ==
=== Conservation status ===
As of 2019, the species A. desaixi is listed as endangered on the IUCN Red List of Threatened Species. The species is listed in Appendix II of CITES meaning international trade is regulated through the CITES permit system.

=== Snakebites ===
The Kenyan who collected the first specimens was bitten by an adult, with a single fang penetrating his right index finger. There was significant swelling and pain. A tourniquet was applied and an unknown antivenin was administered, after which the patient made a full recovery. It is doubtful, however, that the antivenin made any difference in this case, for no antivenin is known to be effective. Nevertheless, since these snakes are relatively large (for Atheris) and their venom is known to contain powerful anticoagulants, a bite should be taken seriously. Poor coagulation may even require blood transfusions.
