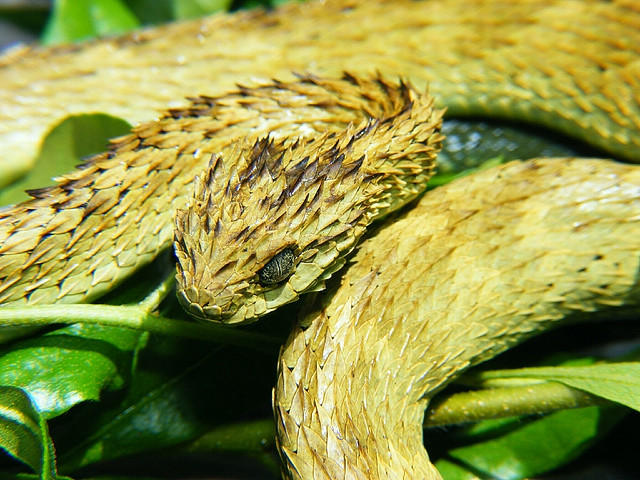
- Atheris hispida

Scientific classification
- Kingdom: Animalia
- Phylum: Chordata
- Class: Reptilia
- Order: Squamata
- Suborder: Serpentes
- Family: Viperidae
- Subfamily: Viperinae
- Genus: Atheris; Cope, 1862

Synonyms
- Chloroechis Bonaparte, 1849; Atheris Cope, 1862; Poecilostolus Günther, 1863

= Atheris =

Atheris Temporal range: Miocene–present 15–0 Ma

Genus of venomous vipers of tropical Africa

Atheris is a genus of venomous snakes, commonly known as bush vipers, in the subfamily Viperinae of the family Viperidae. Species of the genus are found only in tropical subsaharan Africa (excluding southern Africa), and many species have isolated and fragmented geographic distributions due to their confinement to rain forests. Like all other vipers, they are venomous. In an example of convergent evolution, they show many similarities to the arboreal pit vipers of Asia and South America. As of 2026, 18 species are recognized as being valid.

== Description ==
Atheris species are relatively small in size, with adults ranging in total length (tail included) from 55 cm (22 in) for Atheris katangensis to a maximum of 78 cm (31 in) for Atheris squamigera.

All species have a broad, triangular head that is distinct from the neck. The canthus is also distinct, and the snout is broad. The crown is covered with small imbricate or smooth scales, none of which is enlarged. The eyes are relatively large with elliptical pupils. The eyes are separated from the supralabials by 1–3 scale rows and from the nasal by 2–3 scales.

The body is slender, tapering, and slightly laterally compressed. The dorsal scales are overlapping, strongly keeled and have apical pits. These are smaller laterally than middorsally. At midbody there are 14–36 rows of dorsal scales. There are 133–175 rounded ventral scales. The subcaudal scales are single and number 38–67. The tail is strongly prehensile and can support the body while suspended from a branch or a twig.

Members of this genus come in a wide variety of colors and patterns, often within a single species. Atheris ceratophora and A. squamigera are particularly variable.

== Geographic distribution ==
Atheris species inhabit rainforest regions and forests, mostly in remote areas far from human activity. They are found in tropical subsaharan Africa, excluding southern Africa. Some species have only isolated populations, surviving in small sections of ancient rainforest. They once had a much wider distribution but are now declining.

== Conservation status ==
Some species of Atheris are threatened by habitat destruction. A major cause of illness and mortality in both caged and wild bush viper snakes is snake fungal disease.

== Behavior ==
All species of Atheris have extreme aggressive tendencies. They are arboreal, although they can sometimes be found on or near the ground.

== Diet ==
Atheris species prey upon a variety of small amphibians, lizards, rodents, birds, and even other snakes. Some species or populations may specialize in eating frogs, but most have been described as opportunistic feeders. Prey is typically ambushed from a hanging position, held until it has succumbed to the venom, and then swallowed.

== Reproduction ==
All Atheris species are ovoviviparous. Mating takes place in October and November, and the females give birth to live young in March and April.

== In captivity ==
Atheris squamigera is reported to do very well in captivity, needing only arboreal access and having no particular temperature requirements. Captive specimens take mice and small birds. However, there have been reports of cannibalism. Food may be refused during the African winter months of July and August.

== Venom ==
Limited understanding exists about Atheris venoms, except that they are strongly hemotoxic, causing pain, swelling, and blood clotting problems. Until recently, their venoms had often been regarded as less toxic than that of many other species, perhaps because bites are uncommon, but this turned out not to be the case. There are now a number of reports of bites that have led to severe hemorrhaging. A case of a bite from A. nitschei caused local tissue injury, hemolysis, thrombocytopenia, hypofibrinoginemia, coagulopathy, and increased elevation in D-dimer. Envenomation cases from A. chlorechis and A. squamigera have shown similar symptoms. One case was fatal. Atheris-specific antivenom does not exist, and antivenom meant for bites from other species seems to have little effect, although Echis antivenom has been reported to have been of some help in a case of A. squamigera envenomation. Symptomatic treatment is all that can be administered due to the absence of an Atheris-specific antivenom.

== Species ==
Image	Species	Taxon author	Subsp.*	Common name	Geographic range
	A. acuminata	Broadley, 1998	0	Acuminate bush viper	Western Uganda
	A. anisolepis	Mocquard, 1887	0	Mayombe bush viper	West central Africa: Gabon, Congo, west DR Congo, north Angola
	A. barbouri	(Loveridge, 1930)	0	Barbour's short-headed viper, Uzungwe Mountain bush viper	The Udzungwa and Ukinga mountains in southern Tanzania
	A. broadleyi	D. Lawson, 1999	0	Broadley's bush viper	Cameroon, Central African Republic, Nigeria, Congo
	A. ceratophora	F. Werner, 1895	0	Usambara eyelash viper	The Usambara and Uzungwe Mountains in Tanzania
	A. chlorechis^{T}	(Pel, 1851)	0	West African bush viper	West Africa including Guinea-Bissau, Guinea, Sierra Leone, Liberia, Ivory Coast, Ghana, Togo, Benin, isolated locations in Nigeria, Cameroon, Equatorial Guinea, and Gabon
	A. desaixi	Ashe, 1968	0	Mount Kenya bush viper, Ashe's bush viper	Two isolated populations in Kenya: in the forests at Chuka, south-eastern Mount Kenya, and Igembe in the northern Nyambeni range
	A. hetfieldi	Ceríaco, Marques & Bauer, 2020	0	Hetfield’s bush viper	Bioko island, Equatorial Guinea
	A. hirsuta	R. Ernst & Rödel, 2002	0	Tai hairy bush viper	Ivory Coast
	A. hispida	Laurent, 1955	0	African hairy bush viper	Central Africa: DR Congo, south-west Uganda, west Kenya
	A. katangensis	de Witte, 1953	0	Katanga mountain bush viper	Restricted to Upemba National Park, Shaba Province in eastern DR Congo
	A. mabuensis	Branch & Bayliss, 2009	0	Mount Mabu forest viper	Mount Mabu and Mount Namuli, northern Mozambique
	A. matildae	Menegon, Davenport & Howell, 2011	0	Matilda's horned viper	south west Tanzania
	A. mongoensis	Collet & J.-F. Trape, 2020	0	Mongo hairy bush viper	Democratic Republic of Congo
	A. nitschei	Tornier, 1902	0	Great Lakes bush viper	Central Africa from east DR Congo, Uganda and west Tanzania southward to north Malawi and north Zambia.
	A. rungweensis	Bogert, 1940	0	Mt. Rungwe bush viper	southwestern Tanzania, northeastern Zambia, northern Malawi
	A. squamigera	(Hallowell, 1856)	0	Variable bush viper	West and central Africa: Ivory Coast and Ghana, eastward through southern Nigeria to Cameroon, southern Central African Republic, Gabon, Congo, DR Congo, northern Angola, Uganda, Tanzania (Rumanika Game Reserve), western Kenya, and Bioko Island
	A. subocularis	Fischer, 1888	0		Cameroon

- (Not including the nominate subspecies
  ^{T}) Type species

== Taxonomy ==
Until recently, the following species, both of which are terrestrial, were also included in the genus Atheris.

- Montatheris hindii (Boulenger, 1910) – montane viper
- Proatheris superciliaris (W. Peters, 1855) – lowland viper

Together with Atheris, these three genera are sometimes referred to as the tribe Atherini.
