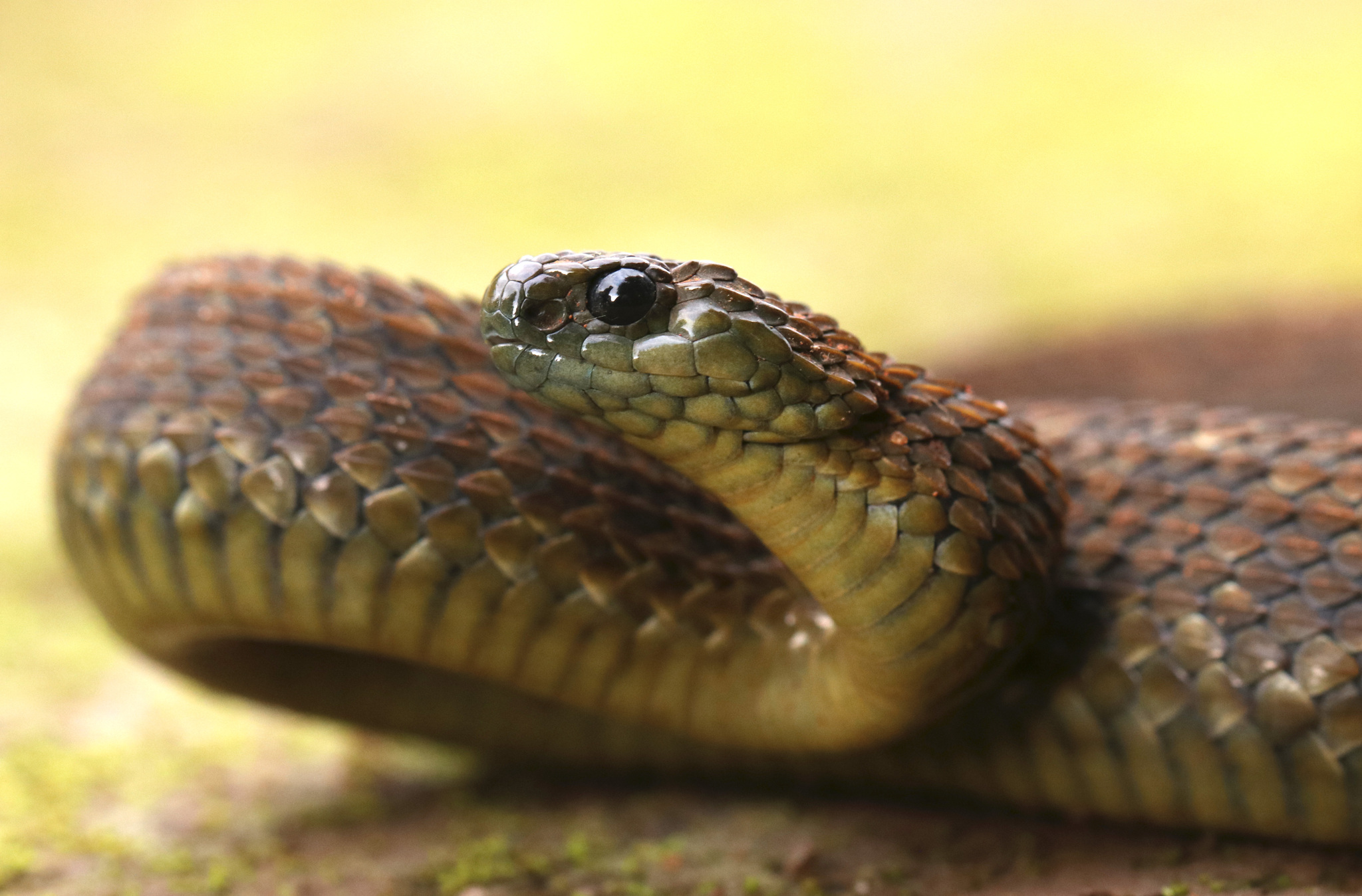

Conservation status
- Vulnerable (IUCN 3.1)

Scientific classification
- Kingdom: Animalia
- Phylum: Chordata
- Class: Reptilia
- Order: Squamata
- Suborder: Serpentes
- Family: Viperidae
- Subfamily: Viperinae
- Genus: Atheris
- Species: A. barbouri

Binomial name
- Atheris barbouri Loveridge, 1930
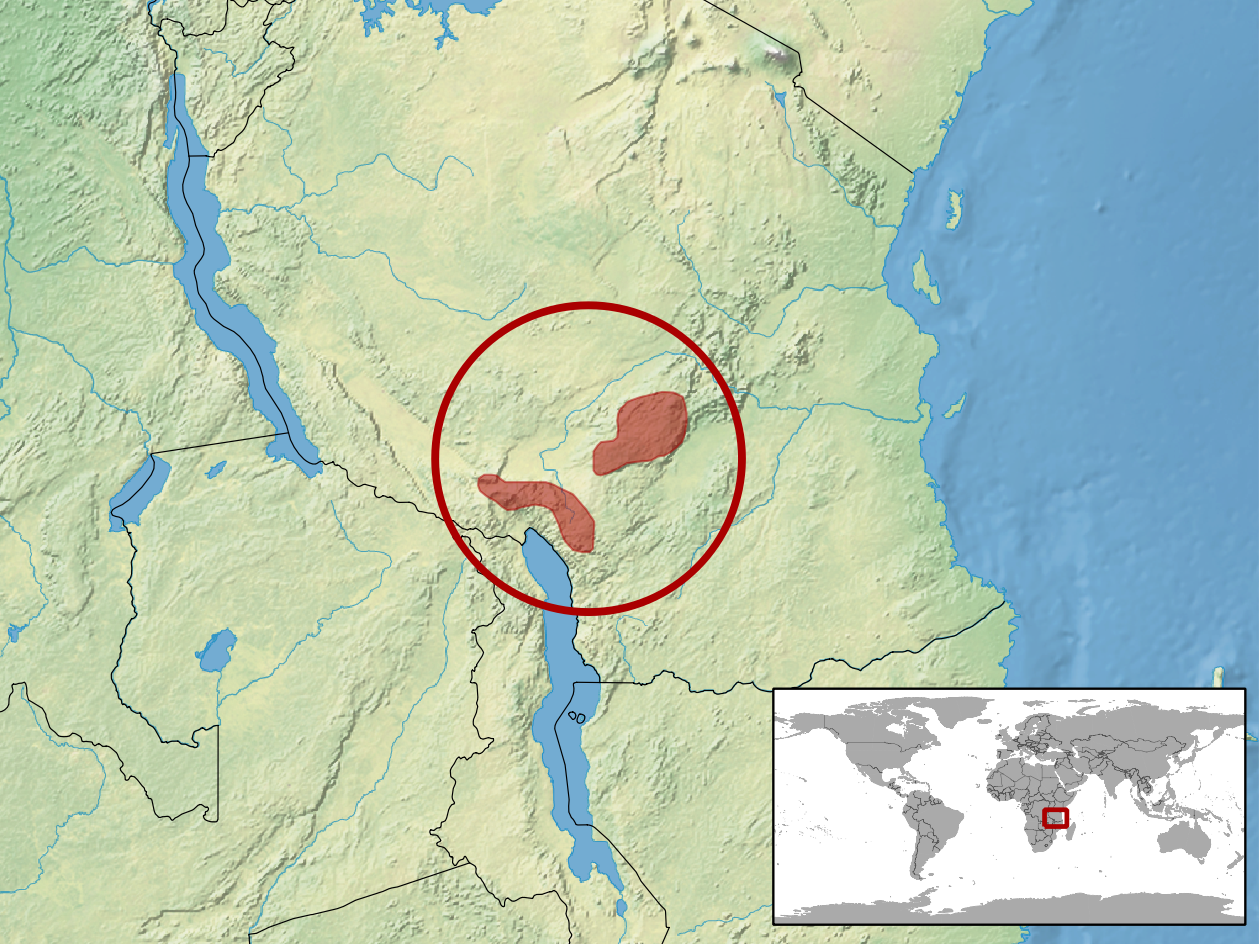

Synonyms
- Atheris barbouri Loveridge, 1930; Adenorhinos barbouri — Marx & Rabb, 1965; Adenorhinus [barbouri ] — Dowling & Duellman, 1978; Atheris barbouri — Menegon et al., 2011

= Atheris barbouri =

Species of snake

Atheris barbouri is a small and rare species of terrestrial viper, a venomous snake in the subfamily Viperinae of the family Viperidae. The species is endemic to the Uzungwe and Ukinga mountains of south-central Tanzania in Africa. No subspecies are recognized as being valid.

== Etymology ==
The specific name, barbouri, is in honor of American herpetologist Thomas Barbour.

== Common names ==
Common names for Atheris barbouri include Uzungwe viper, Barbour's viper, worm-eating viper, Barbour's short-headed viper, and Uzungwe mountain bush viper.

== Taxonomy ==
Atheris barbouri was originally described in 1930 as a member of the genus Atheris (bush vipers). In 1978, it was assigned to the genus Adenorhinos by Dowling & Duellman. It differs morphologically from the Atheris group, but recent research by Lenk et al. (2001) suggests that it is closely related to the sympatric species, Atheris ceratophora. It was returned to the genus Atheris by Menegon et al. in 2011. Future research will show whether A. barbouri should be moved back to Adenorhinus, or that Atheris ceratophora and A. barbouri should form a separate clade.

Atheris barbouri is similar to Montatheris hindii and Proatheris superciliaris, which are also both terrestrial species from monotypic genera, as well as previous members of the Atheris group.

== Description ==
Atheris barbouri is a small species reaching only 40 cm (16 in) in total length (tail included). The head is broad, triangular and distinct from the neck. The snout is short and rounded. The head is covered with small, strongly keeled, imbricate scales. The eyes are prominent, about 1.5 times larger than the distance to the mouth. The nostril is in an extreme forward position and is part of a single nasal scale that touches the preocular scale.

The body is moderately slender, while the tail is relatively short, shorter than other species in the genus Atheris, and not prehensile. The dorsal scales are arranged in 20–23 rows at midbody, and are strongly keeled, except for those in the outermost rows, which are smooth. Ventral scales number 116–122 and are rounded. Subcaudals are 19–23 and are single (undivided). The anal plate is single.

The color pattern consists of a brown to blackish brown ground color with a pair of zigzag stripes that run dorsolaterally from the back of the head to the end of the tail. These stripes may form an irregular chain of darker rhombic blotches down the back. The tail may have a faint, black checkering. The belly color is greenish white to olive.

== Geographic distribution ==
The geographic range of Atheris barbouri is extremely limited. It is known only from the Uzungwe and Ukinga mountains of south-central Tanzania.

The type locality is "Dabaga, Uzungwe Mountains, southeast of Iringa, Tanganyika Territory, altitude 6,000 feet (1,800 m)" (= Udzungwe Mountains, Tanzania).

== Habitat ==
A terrestrial species, Atheris barbouri is found in bushes and bamboo undergrowth on mountain slopes at 1,800 m (5,900 ft). It would seem that moist forest habitats are preferred, but it has also been found in gardens of tea farms.

== Behavior ==
Little is known about the behavior of Atheris barbouri. It was first thought to be a burrowing species, but this is not likely as it has no obvious morphological adaptations for even a semifossorial life.

== Diet ==
Atheris barbouri specializes in eating slugs, earthworms, and other soft-bodied invertebrates, and possibly also frogs.

== Reproduction ==
Atheris barbouri is oviparous. In February 1930, three females were collected that each contained 10 eggs. The largest egg measured 1.0 cm × 0.6 cm (0.39 in × 0.24 in).

== Venom ==
No information is available regarding the venom of Atheris barbouri, its composition, its toxicity, or the effects of a bite. No cases of envenomation have been recorded. However, because of the very limited distribution, bites are unlikely to occur.
