= Atheris acuminata =

Conservation status
- Data Deficient (IUCN 3.1)

Scientific classification
- Kingdom: Animalia
- Phylum: Chordata
- Class: Reptilia
- Order: Squamata
- Suborder: Serpentes
- Family: Viperidae
- Genus: Atheris
- Species: A. acuminata

Binomial name
- Atheris acuminata Broadley, 1998

Species of snake

Atheris acuminata, the acuminate bush viper, is an arboreal species of viper found in Western Uganda, closely related to the viper species Atheris hispida. The species gets the name 'acuminate' and 'acuminata' from the long dorsal scales on the back of its head and the front half of its body, which present as long hollow curves which thin to a sharp point. As with all vipers, A. acuminata is venomous.

== Description ==
Atheris acuminata is distinguished from A. hispida by its pentagonal rostral shield with its two large suprarostrals (of which the A. hispida has three), its enlarged frontal shield, its five interorbitals (of which the A. hispida has 6–10), six supralabials (of which A. hispida has 7-10) and its acuminate spines which go down to its midbody (while A. hispida only has them on its head and neck).

Aside from distinguishing it from A. hispida, A. acuminata has 3 internasals, 10 maximum transverse head scales, 11 or 12 circumorbital scales, no interoculabials, 1 interocunasal, 7 or 8 infralabials and 1 pair of sublinguals.

== Reproduction ==
Atheris acuminata is ovoviviparous.

== Distribution ==
Atheris acuminata is found in the trees of a forest near Nsere Lodge within Kyambura Game Reserve, Ankole District, Western Uganda
