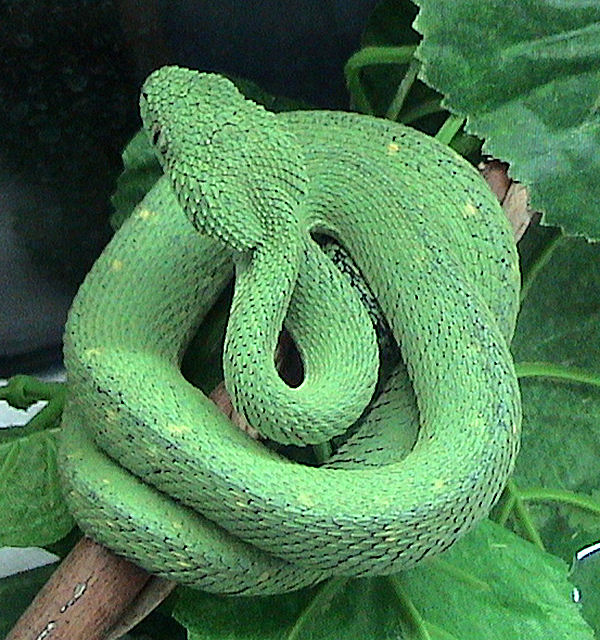

Conservation status
- Least Concern (IUCN 3.1)

Scientific classification
- Kingdom: Animalia
- Phylum: Chordata
- Class: Reptilia
- Order: Squamata
- Suborder: Serpentes
- Family: Viperidae
- Genus: Atheris
- Species: A. chlorechis

Binomial name
- Atheris chlorechis (Pel, 1851)

Synonyms
- Vipera chlorechis Pel, 1851; Vipera chloroechis Schlegel, 1855; Vipera (Echis) chloroechis — Jan, 1859; Tox[icoa]. chloroëchis — Cope, 1860; Vipera chloroechis — Cope, 1862; E[chis]. chlorechis — Jan, 1863; Atheris polylepis W. Peters, 1864; Atheris chloroëchis — W. Peters, 1864; Atheris proximus Rochebrune, 1885; Atheris chlorechis Boulenger, 1896; Atheris chloraechis Cansdale, 1961; Atheris chlorechis — Broadley, 1996

= Atheris chlorechis =

Species of snake

Common names: western bush viper, West African leaf viper, more.

Atheris chlorechis is a viper species found only in the forests of West Africa. No subspecies are currently recognized. It is the type species of its genus. Like all other vipers, it is a venomous species. Atheris chlorechis venom can lead to major systemic envenoming, shock, blood loss due to coagulopathy, and renal failure. There is no antivenom.

== Description ==
Adults average 50 cm (20 inches) in total length (body + tail), with a maximum total length of 70 cm (28 in). The tail is relatively long. The body is relatively slender, with 25–36 midbody rows of dorsal scales. These are heavily keeled, with the keels ending in a swelling at the end of each scale.

Adults have a uniform light green ground color, overlaid with a series of faint yellow, roughly paired spots running dorsally along the length of the body and about 2.5 cm (about 1 in) apart. The belly is pale green in color. Newborns are tan-brown in color, but this changes to a yellow-green hue with irregular dark spots within 24 hours. This second color phase has been described as the reverse of that of the adults and is only seen in individuals less than 25 cm (9.8 in) in total length.

== Common names ==
Western bush viper, West African leaf viper, West African tree viper.

== Geographic range ==
Atheris chlorechis is found in West Africa from Sierra Leone through Guinea, Liberia, Ivory Coast, and Ghana to southern Togo. Records from Nigeria, Cameroon, and Gabon are considered erroneous.

The type locality is listed as "Boutre, Ghana".

== Habitat ==
Found in forests, in dense foliage about 1–2 m (about 3–6 ft) above the ground.

== Feeding ==
Said to feed on rodents, lizards and tree frogs.

== Reproduction ==
Gives birth to 6–9 young in March to April. Newborns are 131–151 mm (about 5–6 inches) in total length.
