= Atheris matildae =

Scientific classification
- Kingdom: Animalia
- Phylum: Chordata
- Class: Reptilia
- Order: Squamata
- Suborder: Serpentes
- Family: Viperidae
- Genus: Atheris
- Species: A. matildae

Binomial name
- Atheris matildae Menegon, Davenport & Howell, 2011

Species of snake

Atheris matildae, also known as Matilda's horned viper, is a species of arboreal forest viper endemic to Tanzania.

== Discovery ==
It was discovered in the Southern Highlands of Tanzania during a 2010–2011 biological survey. The exact location of the viper is unspecified, to protect it from being collected for the illegal pet trade. The snake was described as a new species on December 6, 2011, in a study published in the journal, Zootaxa. A captive breeding colony has already been established by the authors of the study.

== Behavior ==
The species is most likely a nocturnal ambush predator, waiting by streams to ambush frogs.

== Description ==
It resembles Atheris ceratophora, the Usambara bush viper. Atheris matildae is easily distinguished from all its congeners except for the A. ceratophora since they both have two to three enlarged hornlike structures above their eyes. A. matildae measures 64.3 centimetres (25.3 in) in total length, making it larger than A. ceratophora (the largest size ever recorded for A. ceratophora is 51.0 cm).

== Conservation status ==
Matilda's horned viper occupies only a small area further threatened by logging and charcoal production.

== Origin of name ==
Atheris matildae was named after Matilda, the daughter of Tim Davenport, the director of the Wildlife Conservation Society in Tanzania and a member of the three-person team to have discovered the snake.
