= Atheris broadleyi =

- Atheris broadleyi in Cameroon

Conservation status
- Least Concern (IUCN 3.1)

Scientific classification
- Kingdom: Animalia
- Phylum: Chordata
- Class: Reptilia
- Order: Squamata
- Suborder: Serpentes
- Family: Viperidae
- Genus: Atheris
- Species: A. broadleyi

Binomial name
- Atheris broadleyi D. Lawson, 1999

Species of snakes

Atheris broadleyi, also known commonly as Broadley's bush viper, is an arboreal species of venomous snake in the subfamily Viperinae of the family Viperidae. The species is native to Cameroon, the Central African Republic, the Republic of the Congo, and possibly Nigeria. (Note: Presence in Nigeria requires confirmation.)

== Etymology ==
Atheris broadleyi is named in honour of the late Donald G. Broadley, an African herpetologist.

== Description ==
Atheris broadleyi is a medium-sized, rough scaled viper with varying colours and patterns. It has been thought of as a colour morph of Atheris squamigera on multiple occasions and is very similar in appearance.

== Venom ==
The venom of Broadley's bush viper is mainly hemotoxic.

== Reproduction ==
Atheris broadleyi is ovoviviparous.

== Geographic distribution ==
Atheris broadleyi is widely distributed in Cameroon, and its range extends into the Central African Republic and the Republic of the Congo. Its presence in Nigeria requires confirmation. Records from Gabon are considered erroneous.

The type locality of Atheris broadleyi is in the vicinity of Lipondji village, East Province, Cameroon.

== Behaviour ==
Atheris broadleyi is most often nocturnal, but has been known to bask in the sun. Similarly, it is most often arboreal, but has been known to hunt near and on the ground.
