= Swamp adder =

Swamp adder may refer to:

- Proatheris superciliaris, a small viper found in East Africa
- a fictional Indian venomous snake in Arthur Conan Doyle's "The Adventure of the Speckled Band"
