= Viperini =

Viperini is a taxonomic synonym that may refer to:

- Viperidae, the family of snakes known as vipers
- Viperinae, the subfamily of vipers known as true vipers
