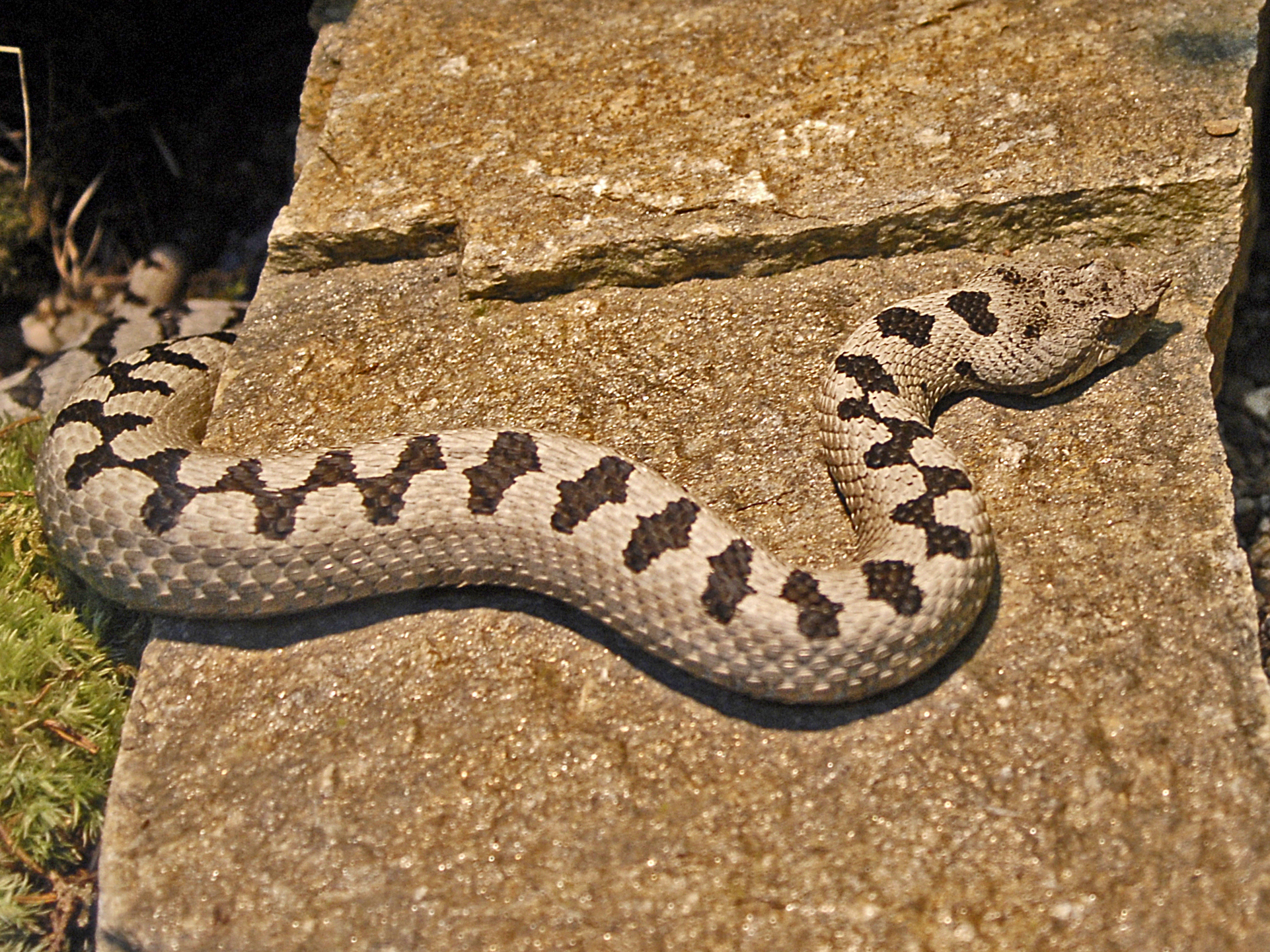

Conservation status
- Near Threatened (IUCN 3.1)

Scientific classification
- Kingdom: Animalia
- Phylum: Chordata
- Class: Reptilia
- Order: Squamata
- Suborder: Serpentes
- Family: Viperidae
- Genus: Vipera
- Species: V. transcaucasiana

Binomial name
- Vipera transcaucasiana Boulenger, 1913

Synonyms
- Vipera ammodytes var. transcaucasiana Boulenger, 1913; Vipera ammodytes transversovirgata Zarevskij, 1915; V[ipera]. a[mmodytes]. transcaucasiana — Bruno, 1985; [Vipera ammodytes] transcaucasiana — Golay et al., 1993; [Vipera ammodytes] transcaucasiana — Herprint Internatl., 1994

= Vipera transcaucasiana =

Species of snake

Common names: Transcaucasian sand viper, Armenian sand viper.

Vipera transcaucasiana is a venomous viper species (regarded by some as a subspecies) endemic to parts of Georgia and northern Turkish Anatolia.

== Description ==
It grows to a maximum total length (body + tail) of 75 cm (30 in), but is usually not so large.

On the head, the rostral scale is wider than it is long, supporting a rostral appendage or "horn" covered with 9–17 scales arranged in 3 (rarely 2 or 4) transverse rows. On the dorsum, there are two large supraoculars of which the posterior extends beyond the posterior margin of the eye. The rest of the head is covered with small, irregular scales that are either smooth or weakly keeled. There are 7 interocular scale rows. The frontal and parietal plates are usually absent. The nostril is located within a single, large, concave nasal scale that is rarely divided. The nasal is separated from the rostral by a single nasorostral scale. The temporal scales are either smooth or weakly keeled. There are 11–12 circumorbital scales, while two rows separate the eye from the supralabials. There are 9–10 supralabials, of which the 4th and 5th are the largest.

Midbody there are 21 rows of strongly keeled dorsal scales, while those bordering the ventrals are either smooth or only weakly keeled. There are 148–160 ventrals, and 32–40 paired subcaudal scales. The anal plate is single.

The color pattern consists of a light gray, ash gray, silver gray, pale gray, or grayish white ground color, overlaid with a dorsal pattern of narrow transverse bands. The top of the head and the nasal "horn" do not have any irregular dark markings, except for a weak V-marking on the back of the head. The iris is golden or coppery. Juveniles have a similar color pattern.

== Geographic range ==
It is confined to sections of Georgia and northern Turkish Anatolia, according to Nilson et al. (1988). Contrary to some publications, this subspecies does not occur in Armenia, Azerbaijan or Iran.

== Taxonomy ==
Some elevate V. a. transcaucasiana to species level based on genetic distances that are larger than other full species, such as between V. aspis and V. latastei (Herrmann et al. 1987, 1992).
