= Vipera berus sachalinensis =

Scientific classification
- Kingdom: Animalia
- Phylum: Chordata
- Class: Reptilia
- Order: Squamata
- Suborder: Serpentes
- Family: Viperidae
- Genus: Vipera
- Species: V. berus
- Subspecies: V. b. sachalinensis

Trinomial name
- Vipera berus sachalinensis Zarevskij, 1917

Synonyms
- Vipera berus sachalinensis Zarevskij, 1917; Vipera sachalinensis — Mertens, 1934; Vipera (Vipera) berus sachalinensis — Obst, 1983

Subspecies of snake

Vipera berus sachalinensis (Sakhalin Island adder a.k.a. Sakhalin adder) is a viper subspecies endemic to Asia. Like all other vipers, it is venomous.

== Geographic range ==
It is found in the Russian Far East (Amur), China (Jilin), North Korea, and on Sakhalin Island.

According to Schwarz (1936), the type locality is "Sachalin" (= Sakhalin Island, Russia).

== Taxonomy ==
McDiarmid et al. (1999) follow Golay et al. (1993) and recognize V. b. sachalinensis as a subspecies of V. berus. However, it has been considered a full species in recent literature.
