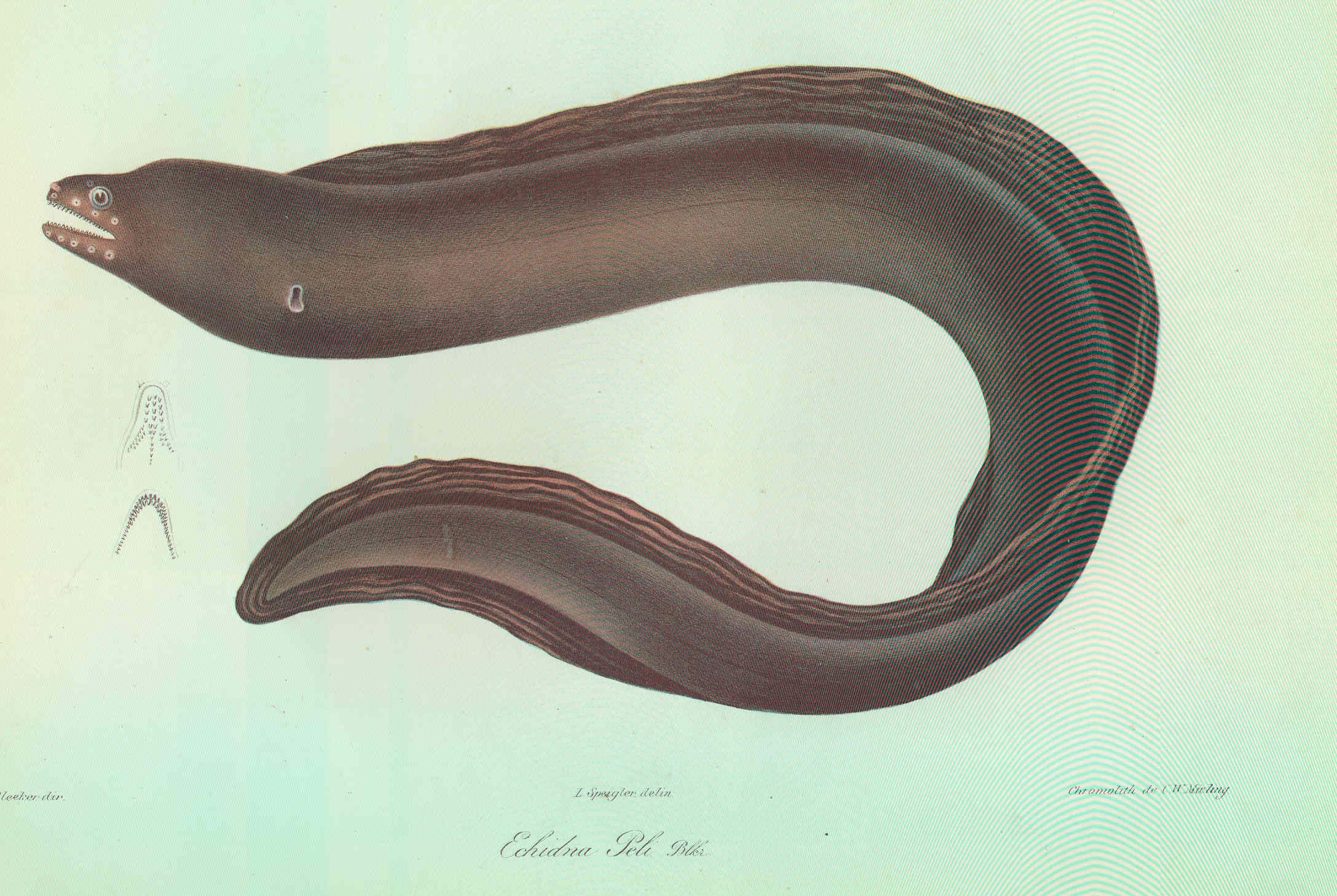

Conservation status
- Least Concern (IUCN 3.1)

Scientific classification
- Kingdom: Animalia
- Phylum: Chordata
- Class: Actinopterygii
- Order: Anguilliformes
- Family: Muraenidae
- Genus: Echidna
- Species: E. peli

Binomial name
- Echidna peli (Kaup, 1856)

= Echidna peli =

Species of fish

Echidna peli is a moray eel found in the eastern Atlantic Ocean. It was first named by Johann Jakob Kaup in 1856, and is commonly known as the pebbletooth moray.

The fish is named in honor of Hendrik Severinus Pel (1818-1876) the Dutch Governor of the Gold Coast which is now Ghana, who sent the type specimen to the Rijksmuseum van Natuurlijke Historie in Leiden, Netherlands.
