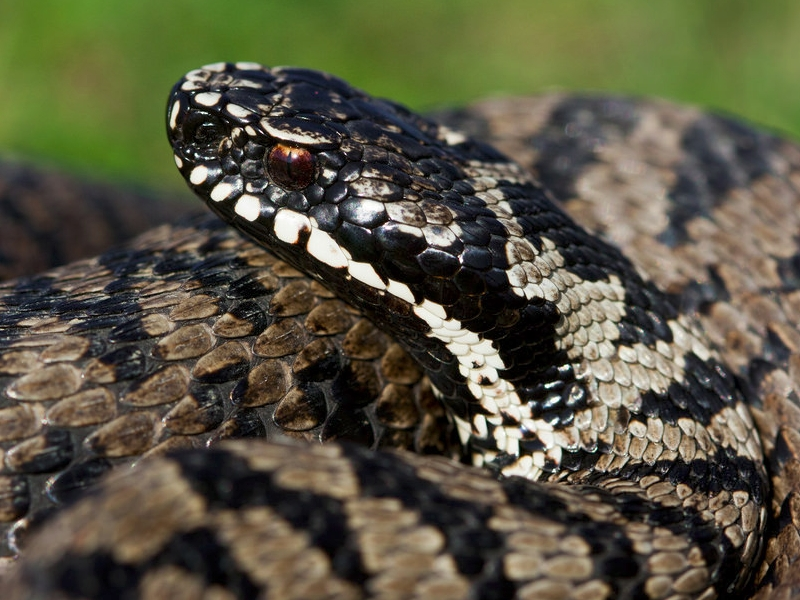

Scientific classification
- Kingdom: Animalia
- Phylum: Chordata
- Class: Reptilia
- Order: Squamata
- Suborder: Serpentes
- Family: Viperidae
- Genus: Vipera
- Species: V. berus
- Subspecies: V. b. bosniensis

Trinomial name
- Vipera berus bosniensis Boettger, 1889

Synonyms
- List: Vipera berus var. bosniensis Boettger In Mojsisovics, 1889; Vipera berus var. pseudaspis Schreiber, 1912; Vipera coronis coronis A.F. Reuss, 1927; Vipera coronis leopardina A.F. Reuss, 1927 (nomen nudum); Vipera coronis nigroides A.F. Reuss, 1927 (nomen nudum); Vipera coronis zamenoides A.F. Reuss, 1927 (nomen nudum); V[ipera]. (Mesocoronis) coronis — A.F. Reuss, 1927; Mesocoronis coronis — A.F. Reuss, 1927; V[ipera]. (Mesocoronis) coronis coronis — A.F. Reuss, 1927; V[ipera]. (Mesocoronis) coronis leopardina — A.F. Reuss, 1927; V[ipera]. (Mesocoronis) coronis nigroides — A.F. Reuss, 1927; [Vipera (Mesocoronis)] coronis zamenoides — A.F. Reuss, 1927; [Vipera] aspoides A.F. Reuss, 1927 (nomen nudum); Vipera (Mesocoronis) aspoides — A.F. Reuss, 1927; Vipera (Mesocoronis) aspoides annulata A.F. Reuss, 1927; [Vipera] eimeri A.F. Reuss, 1927 (nomen nudum); Vipera (Mesocoronis) eimeri — A.F. Reuss, 1927; Vipera rudolphoides A.F. Reuss, 1927 (nomen nudum); Vipera (Mesocoronis) rudolphoides — A.F. Reuss, 1927; V[ipera]. (Mesocoronis) hybr. kochi A.F. Reuss, 1927; Vipera (Mesocoronis) bosnensis [sic] — F. Werner, 1930 (ex errore); Mesocoronis aspoides — A.F. Reuss, 1930; Mesocoronis bosniensis atrobosniensis A.F. Reuss, 1930; Mesocoronis coronis nigroides — A.F. Reuss, 1930; Mesocoronis coronis ornata A.F. Reuss, 1930 (nomen nudum); Mesocoronis rudolphoides — A.F. Reuss, 1935; Mesocoponis [sic] rudolphoides — A.F. Reuss, 1935 (ex errore); V[ipera]. berus bosniensis — Schwarz, 1935; Vipera (Mesocoronis) nigroides — Schwarz, 1936; Mesocoronis pseudaspoides A.F. Reuss, 1937; Vipera (Vipera) berus bosniensis — Obst, 1983

= Vipera berus bosniensis =

Subspecies of snake

Vipera berus bosniensis, the Balkan cross adder or Bosnian viper, is a venomous subspecies of viper endemic to the Balkan Peninsula.

== Geographic range ==
It is only found within the Balkan Peninsula, particularly the Herzegovina region of Bosnia and Herzegovina, hence its common name.

== Taxonomy ==
McDiarmid et al. (1999) follow Golay et al. (1993) and recognize V. b. bosniensis as a subspecies of V. berus. However, it has been considered a full species in recent literature.
