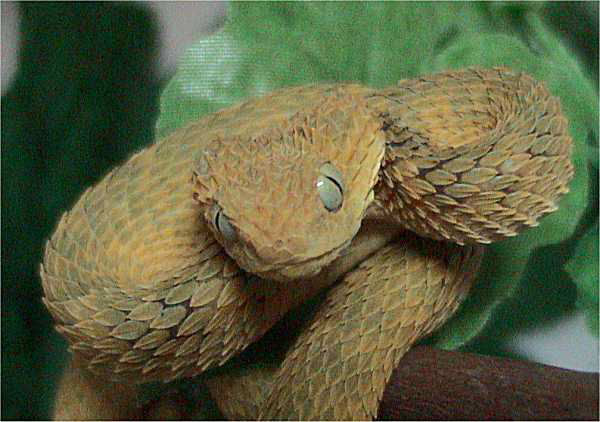

Conservation status
- Least Concern (IUCN 3.1)

Scientific classification
- Kingdom: Animalia
- Phylum: Chordata
- Class: Reptilia
- Order: Squamata
- Suborder: Serpentes
- Family: Viperidae
- Genus: Atheris
- Species: A. squamigera

Binomial name
- Atheris squamigera (Hallowell, 1856)

Synonyms
- Echis squamigera Hallowell, 1856; Toxicoa squamigera — Cope, 1860; Atheris squamatus Cope, 1862; Toxicoa squamata — Cope, 1862; Echis squamata — Cope, 1862; Poecilostolus burtonii Günther, 1863; Atheris burtonii — Günther, 1863; Atheris squamigera — W. Peters, 1864; Atheris Lucani Rochebrune, 1885; Atheris subocularis Fischer, 1888; Atheris squamiger — Boulenger, 1896; Atheris squamigera — Bogert, 1940; Atheris squamigera squamigera — Laurent, 1956; Atheris squamigera robusta Laurent, 1956; Atheris squamiger squamiger — Klemmer, 1963; Atheris squamiger — Hughes & Barry, 1969; Atheris squamiger robustus — Golay et al. 1993; Atheris squamigera — Broadley, 1996

= Atheris squamigera =

Species of snake

Atheris squamigera (common names: green bush viper, variable bush viper, leaf viper, Hallowell's green tree viper, and others) is a venomous viper species endemic to west and central Africa. No subspecies are currently recognized.

== Description ==
Atheris squamigera grows to an average total length (body + tail) of 46 to 60 cm (18 to 24 in), with a maximum total length that sometimes exceeds 78 cm (31 in). Females are usually larger than males.

The head is broad and flat, distinct from the neck. The mouth has a very large gape. The head is thickly covered with keeled, imbricate scales. The rostral scale is not visible from above. A very small scale just above the rostral is flanked by very large scales on either side. The nostrils are lateral. The eye and the nasal are separated by 2 scales. Across the top of the head, there are 7 to 9 interorbital scales. There are 10 to 18 circumorbital scales. There are 2 (rarely 1 or more than 2) rows of scales that separate the eyes from the labials. There are 9 to 12 supralabials and 9 to 12 sublabials. Of the latter, the anterior 2 or 3 touch the chin shields, of which there is only one small pair. The gular scales are keeled.

Midbody there are 15 to 23 rows of dorsal scales, 11 to 17 posteriorly. There are 152 to 175 ventral scales and 45 to 67 undivided subcaudals. It is possible that there is a variation in morphometric characters related to habitat:

	Southern forests	Northern grasslands
Midbody dorsal scale rows	17	21
Ventral scales	171	168
Subcaudal scales	52	58

The coloration is the same in some populations, but variable in others. The dorsal color varies from sage green or light green to green, dark green, bluish, olive or dark olive brown. Rare specimens may be found that are yellow, reddish or slate gray. The scales have light-colored keels and sometimes yellow tips that form a series of 30 or more light crossbands or chevrons. On the tail, there are 10 to 19 chevrons: not always clearly defined, but usually present. The ventral edge of the dorsum has light spots in pairs. An interstitial black color is visible only when the skin is stretched. The belly is yellow or dull to pale olive; it may be uniform in color, or heavily mottled with blackish spots. The throat is sometimes yellow. The tail has a conspicuous ivory white tip, 7 to 12 mm long, extending back over 10 subcaudals.

Neonates have a dark, olive coloration with wavy bars, paler olive or yellowish olive with fine dark olive margins, bars at 5 mm (0.20 in) intervals, and a belly that is paler greenish olive. The adult color pattern develops within 3 to 4 months.

== Reproduction in the wild ==
In the wild Atheris squamigeras begin reproducing once they reach sexual maturity at 42 months for females, and at 24 months for males respectively. Reproduction takes place once annually, most often during the wet season. A. squamigera is viviparous, and a single successful pairing can produce up to 19 neonates, although the average is 7–9. The female A. squamigera carries her young internally during a gestation period of two months. Following birth, the neonates are abandoned by the mother as they are born venomous and entirely self sufficient.

== Diet and hunting ==
The diet of Atheris squamigera consists primarily of small mammals, although cases of cannibalism within the species have been documented.

A. squamigera is a nocturnal hunter and its coloring allows it to blend in with its environment and ambush the small prey it feeds on. It is equipped with two front hollow fangs through which it injects its prey with hemotoxic venom rendering it defenseless.

== Common names ==
Common names for Atheris squamigera include green bush viper, variable bush viper, leaf viper, common bush viper, bush viper, tree viper, Hallowell's green tree viper, and Yété in Mongo. Keepers and breeders of captive specimens commonly refer to the species simply as a "Squam."

== Geographic range ==
Atheris squamigera is found in the forest habitats of West and central Africa: from Ghana eastward to western Kenya and Tanzania, south to northern Angola and Bioko Island.

The type locality is given as "Near the river Gaboon, Guinea" [Gabon].

A. squamigera is the most well distributed species of the Atheris genus. Scientists believe that the current pattern of dispersal of the Atheris species, including that of the A. squamigera, may have been influenced by a combination of past climatic events, geological activities, the shifting of tectonic plates over millions of years, as well as stochastic dispersal.

== Habitat ==
Atheris squamigera inhabits mostly rainforest, preferring relatively low and thick flowering bushes.

== Breeding in captivity ==
Atheris squamigera requires a very high level of humidity to breed. In one case, males and females were kept separate from January to the end of November. Two females became gravid (with one observed mating). Each produced eight young: a smaller percentage were yellow (possible recessive gene), most being green. In each brood, there was also one nonviable green specimen. Some of the neonates fed readily on frogs, while the others had to be force-fed pinkie mice. All fed independently after a few months.

== Venom ==
Bites from Atheris squamigera have resulted in at least one report of severe hematological complications as well as two deaths. Although no specific antivenom is made for the genus Atheris, antivenom for the genus Echis has been shown to be partially effective in neutralizing Atheris venom.

== Taxonomy ==
A number of subspecies of Atheris squamigera may be encountered in literature. These include:

- Atheris squamigera squamigera (Hallowell, 1856), found in Ghana to Cameroon, DR Congo, Uganda, western Kenya and Angola.
- Atheris squamigera robusta Laurent, 1956, from the Ituri Forest in Province Orientale (DR Congo). It is sometimes described as growing larger, having a lower subcaudal count and only a single row of scales between the eye and the upper labials.
- Atheris squamigera anisolepis Mocquard, 1887, (see A. anisolepis).

Furthermore, specimens from Dimonika and Menengue in Congo are sometimes treated as a separate species: A. laeviceps. It has been distinguished as having a group of small scales on top of the head, a row of scales that separates the suboculars and the upper labials, as well as a yellow coloration.
