= Atheris hetfieldi =

Scientific classification
- Kingdom: Animalia
- Phylum: Chordata
- Class: Reptilia
- Order: Squamata
- Suborder: Serpentes
- Family: Viperidae
- Genus: Atheris
- Species: A. hetfieldi

Binomial name
- Atheris hetfieldi Ceríaco, Marques, & Bauer, 2020

Species of snake

Atheris hetfieldi, or Hetfield's bush viper, is a species of viper found in Bioko Island. The species gets its name in honour of James A. Hetfield, the vocalist and guitarist from Metallica as the authors were fans of the band from a young age and naming a species after a celebrity helps to raise awareness for biodiversity.

== Description ==
In comparison to most other Atheris species, A. hetfieldi lacks "horns" above its eyes, has 1 or 2 rows of scales between the eyes and supralabials, lacks lanceolate or acuminate scales on the top of its head, lacks markings on the top or sides of its head, has 153 ventral scales, has 47 to 50 undivided subcaudals, has 4 irregularly sized suprarostrals, has 3 scales between the eye and the nasal, has 19 or 20 interrictals, has 23 to 25 midbody scale rows, has 10 interorbitals and has a brown-green dorsal coloration with large, dark transverse markings.

A. hetfieldi can grow to a known maximum of 52 cm (20 in).

== Distribution ==
Specifically, A. hetfieldi has been found on Moka road in Bioko Island, and it is the only snake considered endemic there.
