= Albany adder =

Conservation status
- Endangered (IUCN 3.1)

Scientific classification
- Kingdom: Animalia
- Phylum: Chordata
- Class: Reptilia
- Order: Squamata
- Suborder: Serpentes
- Family: Viperidae
- Genus: Bitis
- Species: B. albanica

Binomial name
- Bitis albanica Hewitt, 1937

Synonyms
- Bitis cornuta albanica — Branch, 1999; Vipera armata A. Smith, 1826

Species of snake

The Albany adder (Bitis albanica) is a viper species. It was previously considered a subspecies of Bitis cornuta. Its range is restricted to eastern and southern Cape Province in South Africa. Like all vipers, it is venomous.

It is extremely rare, and had been thought potentially extinct until four live specimens and one road kill were found in late 2016 or early 2017. Only 12 individuals have been identified since the species was discovered in 1937.

== Description ==
This subspecies does not have the "horns" that are characteristic of the nominate race, B. c. cornuta, although it does have prominent bumps over the eyes. The coloration is brown to reddish brown, and they may also lack the distinctive pattern of the typical form.

This is a small adder. Maximum recorded snout to vent length (SVL) for males is 27 cm (11 in); maximum recorded SVL for females is 22.5 cm (8.9 in).

== Taxonomy ==
Branch (1999) elevated B. c. albanica to species level: Bitis albanica.

It is commonly known as the Albany adder, eastern hornsman adder, or eastern many-horned adder.

== Distribution and habitat ==
It is found in Eastern and southern Cape Province in South Africa. They are also found in succulent thickets in the Algoa Bay area of the Eastern Cape, occurring between 50 and 500 m above sea level.

The type locality is listed as "The Dene (Port Elizabeth), Addo, and from dry scrub districts near Grahamstown such as Brak Kloof, farm Springvale, and Kleinpoort near Committees ... Eastern Cape Province, South Africa."
