= Hendrik Severinus Pel =

Dutch zoologist and administrator

- Born: 30 August 1818; Leiden, Netherlands
- Died: 11 January 1876 (aged 57); Leiden, Netherlands
- Scientific career
- Fields: Zoology
- Workplaces: Rijksmuseum van Natuurlijke Historie

Hendrik Severinus Pel (30 August 1818 – 11 January 1876) was a Dutch zoologist and colonial administrator on the Dutch Gold Coast.

== Biography ==
Hendrik Pel was born in Leiden to warehouse keeper Isaac Pel and Adriana Lammerina Hunink. On 1 January 1832, at age 13, Hendrik Pel was appointed élève at the Rijksmuseum van Natuurlijke Historie and educated as a taxidermist. Pel had an adventurous nature and inquired with his superiors about the possibility to be sent abroad as a collector of specimens. The museum's director Coenraad Jacob Temminck saw in Pel an excellent candidate for the position of collector on the Dutch Gold Coast; Temminck had already sent the medical officer A.J. Baierlein to the Gold Coast in 1822 to collect specimens, but he died soon after his arrival, and later attempts to have the officers of medicine on the Gold Coast send specimens to the Netherlands failed due to their unfamiliarity with taxidermy.

Temminck tried to persuade the government to attach Pel to Jan Verveer's 1838 expedition sent to the Gold Coast to "quell the Ahanta insurrection," but his request was denied, as due to the previous failures the government had grown wary with sending taxidermists to the Gold Coast. In 1840, Temminck eventually convinced the government by suggesting to send Pel as an ordinary colonial administrator to the Coast with the instruction to collect specimens in his spare time. Pel was installed as assistant on the Coast of Guinea by royal decree of 28 June 1840.

After arriving in Elmina in December 1840, Pel was appointed commandant of Fort Orange in Sekondi on 13 April 1841. This was followed on 4 January 1842 by an appointment as head of the recruitment depot for soldiers of the Netherlands East Indies Army in Kumasi, relieving Jacob Huydecoper. Both Temminck and Pel himself had actively lobbied for Pel to get this appointment, as that would mean the only opportunity for Pel to gather specimens in the Gold Coast interior. Pel was recalled to Elmina on 7 February 1842, however, as the government stopped the recruitment of soldiers due to British objections. Pel had not been able to gather specimens, but did publish an account of his journey to Kumasi.

On 8 March 1842, Pel was appointed commandant of Fort Batenstein in Butre. At this post, he was also responsible for the oversight of the Dutch mining enterprise in Dabokrom. It is in Butre and Dabokrom that Pel was able to gather most specimens of his career on the Gold Coast. In January 1844, Pel was promoted to resident of Fort Crèvecoeur in Accra, which he found less interesting for taxidermy. On 25 February 1845, Pel was appointed to bookkeeper, fiscal, secretary and cashier ad interim in Elmina, and on 3 September 1847 he was again sent to Fort Batenstein in Butre, but now as resident. He would stay there until he was granted European leave in late 1850.

For almost the entire year of 1851, Pel was back in the Netherlands, working on an article about hunting on the Gold Coast and four zoological publications. In January 1852, Pel resumed his duties in the colonial administration of the Gold Coast as bookkeeper, fiscal, secretary and cashier, an office he had earlier occupied in an ad interim position. This office made Pel second-in-command of the colony, but also prevented him from devoting much time to taxidermy. Pel moved back to the Netherlands in March 1855 and was honourably discharged from his duties by royal decree of 1 September 1855.

== Scientific contributions ==
In his article about hunting on the Gold Coast, Hendrik Pel was the first zoologist to describe the West African bush viper or Atheris chlorechis. Of much higher significance for the scientific community were the books and articles written by others about the specimens Pel sent to the Netherlands. Temminck published Esquisses zoologiques sur la Côte de Guinee (1853) about the specimens of mammals sent by Pel, and the German ornithologist Gustav Hartlaub published two articles and a book based in large part on Pel's bird specimens. Pel's fish specimens were studied by ichthyologist Pieter Bleeker, Pel's snake specimens were studied by herpetologist Hermann Schlegel, and Pel's Crustacea specimens were the subject of Jan Adrianus Herklots's dissertation.

== Taxon named in his honor ==
- Pel's fishing owl, Scotopelia peli
- Pel's pouched bat Saccolaimus peli and
- Pel's flying squirrel Anomalurus pelii are named after Hendrik Pel.
- The scientific name of the bristle-nosed barbet, Gymnobucco peli, is also after Pel.
- The moray eel Echidna peli (Kaup, 1856) is named after him.

== Personal life ==
Hendrik Pel married Elisabeth Margaretha van Romburg in Leiden on 24 July 1867.

== Publications ==
- Aanteekeningen gehouden op eene reis van St. George Delmina naar Comassie, hoofdstad van het Ashantijnsche Rijk, en gedurende een kort verblijf aldaar: medegedeeld van wege het bestuur van 's Rijks-Museum van Natuurlijke historie te Leiden (1842)
- Over de jagt aan de Goudkust, volgens eene tienjarige eigene ondervinding (1851)
- Over eene nieuwe soort van Polynemus: Polynemus macronemus (1851)
- Over Colobus Verus (1851)
- Over bos Brachyceros: met twee afbeeldingen van den Schedel dezer soort (1852)
- Verklaring eener afbeelding van Stenops Potto (1852)
