= Atheris mabuensis =

Conservation status
- Endangered (IUCN 3.1)

Scientific classification
- Kingdom: Animalia
- Phylum: Chordata
- Class: Reptilia
- Order: Squamata
- Suborder: Serpentes
- Family: Viperidae
- Genus: Atheris
- Species: A. mabuensis

Binomial name
- Atheris mabuensis Branch & Bayliss, 2009

Species of snake

Atheris mabuensis, the Mount Mabu forest viper, is a species of venomous snake in the family Viperidae. The species is endemic to Mozambique.

== Discovery ==
During his second reconnaissance visit to Mount Mabu (23–26 January 2006) Dr. Julian Bayliss found a very young forest viper in leaf litter on the floor of closed-canopy wet forest on Mount Mabu at approximately 1,000 m (3,300 ft). On examination in the Port Elizabeth Museum (BayWorld, acronym PEM) herpetological collection by Prof. Bill Branch, the specimen was identified as a member of the genus Atheris, which had never previously been recorded from Mozambique and which, moreover, represented a substantial southern range extension for the genus.
