= Atheris mongoensis =

Scientific classification
- Kingdom: Animalia
- Phylum: Chordata
- Class: Reptilia
- Order: Squamata
- Suborder: Serpentes
- Family: Viperidae
- Genus: Atheris
- Species: A. mongoensis

Binomial name
- Atheris mongoensis Collet & Trape, 2020

Species of snake

Atheris mongoensis, also known as Yété in Mongo, Vipère arboricole mongo in French or Mongo Hairy Bush Viper in English, is a species of viper found in Bioko Island. The species gets its name in reference to the ancient Mongo Kingdom which occupied the Mbandaka region, which the species comes from.

== Description ==
Atheris mongoensis is distinct from other Atheris species by its long lanceolate and erect scales on the top of its head and above its eyes which have a small knob at their ends, its combination of entire, divided and narrow lanceolate tail scales, its 19-21 dorsal scales, its 141-152 ventral scales, its 43-55 subcaudal scale rows, its three suprarostrals, its two scales between its nasal and eye and the two rows of scales between its eye and its supralabials present in females, one row of which is absent in males.

== Distribution ==
Specifically, Atheris mongoensis is found in the areas surrounding the Mbandaka region by the Congo River in the Democratic Republic of the Congo.
