= Atheris subocularis =

Conservation status
- Data Deficient (IUCN 3.1)

Scientific classification
- Kingdom: Animalia
- Phylum: Chordata
- Class: Reptilia
- Order: Squamata
- Suborder: Serpentes
- Family: Viperidae
- Genus: Atheris
- Species: A. subocularis

Binomial name
- Atheris subocularis Fischer, 1888

Species of snake

Atheris subocularis is a species of snake in the family Viperidae. It is endemic to Cameroon.
