= Atheris katangensis =

Conservation status
- Near Threatened (IUCN 3.1)

Scientific classification
- Kingdom: Animalia
- Phylum: Chordata
- Class: Reptilia
- Order: Squamata
- Suborder: Serpentes
- Family: Viperidae
- Genus: Atheris
- Species: A. katangensis

Binomial name
- Atheris katangensis de Witte, 1953

Species of snake

Atheris katangensis, also known as the Katanga Mountain bush viper and other common names, is a species of venomous snake in the subfamily Viperinae of the family Viperidae. The species is native to the eastern Democratic Republic of the Congo and Zambia. There are no subspecies that are recognized as being valid.

== Description ==
Atheris katangensis attains a maximum total length (tail included) of only 40 cm (16 in), making it the second smallest member of the genus Atheris.

The head is flat, triangular, distinct from the neck, and covered with small keeled scales. The snout is rounded. Midbody there are 24–31 rows of dorsal scales. The tail is short. Males and females have 45–59 and 38–42 subcaudal scales respectively.

The color pattern consists of a purple-brown or yellow-brown ground color, overlaid with paired dorsolateral lines of a contrasting shade. These lines may break into a zigzag pattern and run from head to tail. The belly is yellowish, as is the tip of the tail.

== Common names ==
Atheris katangensis is also known as the Shaba bush viper, Katanga Mountain bush viper, Upemba bush viper, Katanga bush viper, and the Katanga tree viper.

== Geographic range ==
Atheris katangensis is found in the Upemba National Park, Katanga Province (Shaba Province) in the eastern Democratic Republic of the Congo and in Zambia.

The type locality given is "Mubale-Munte (région du confluent), sous-affluent de la rive droite de la Lufira [alt. 1480], Park National de l'Upemba".

== Habitat ==
The habitat of Atheris katangensis consists of gallery forest along rivers at altitudes between 1,200 and 1,500 meters (about 4,000–5,000 ft).

== Behavior ==
Atheris katangensis is arboreal.

== Reproduction ==
Atheris katangensis is ovoviviparous.
