= Atheris hirsuta =

Conservation status
- Data Deficient (IUCN 3.1)

Scientific classification
- Kingdom: Animalia
- Phylum: Chordata
- Class: Reptilia
- Order: Squamata
- Suborder: Serpentes
- Family: Viperidae
- Genus: Atheris
- Species: A. hirsuta

Binomial name
- Atheris hirsuta Ernst & Rödel, 2002
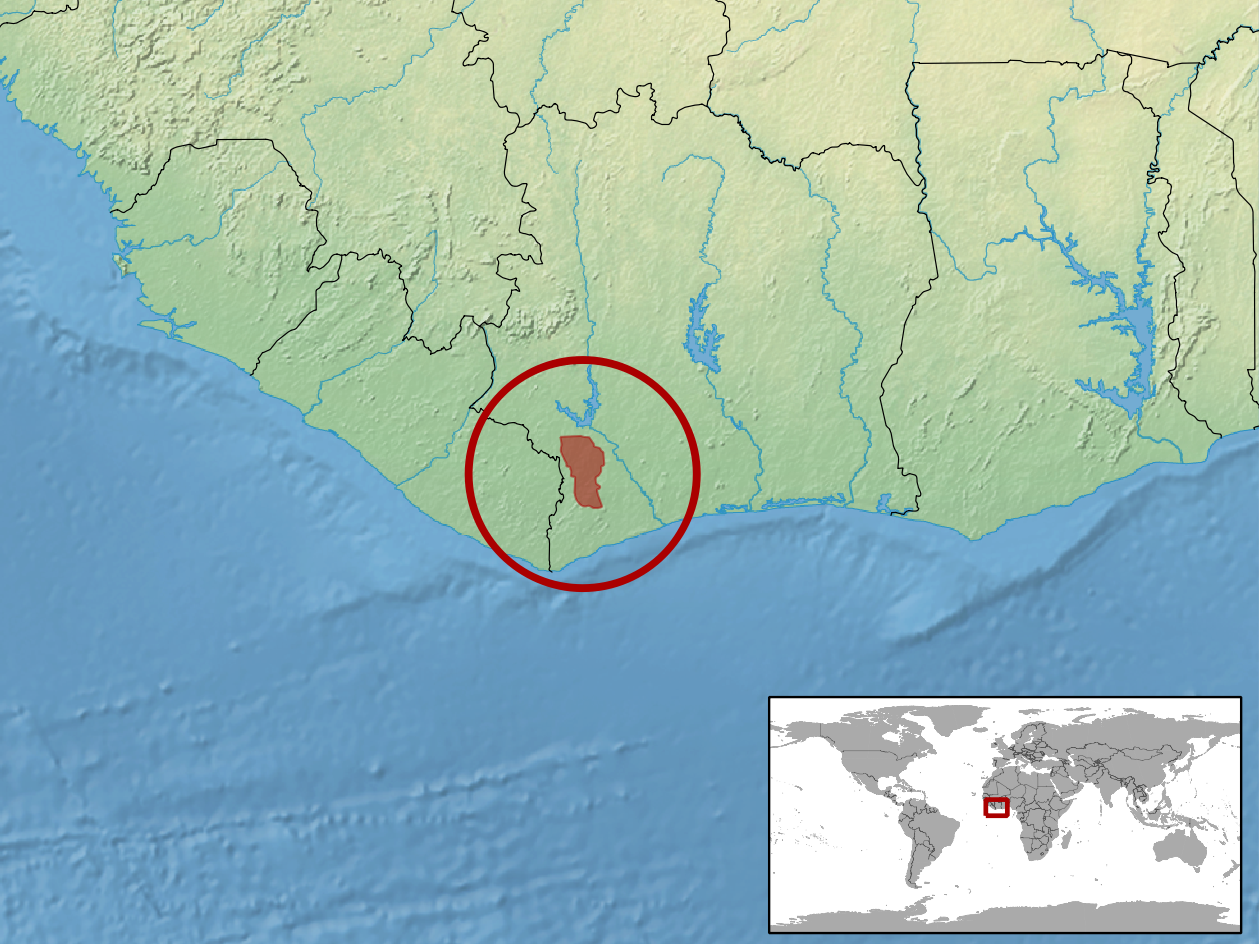

Species of snake

Atheris hirsuta, commonly known as the Tai hairy bush viper, is a species of venomous bush viper that is endemic to the Tai National Park in southwestern Ivory Coast.
