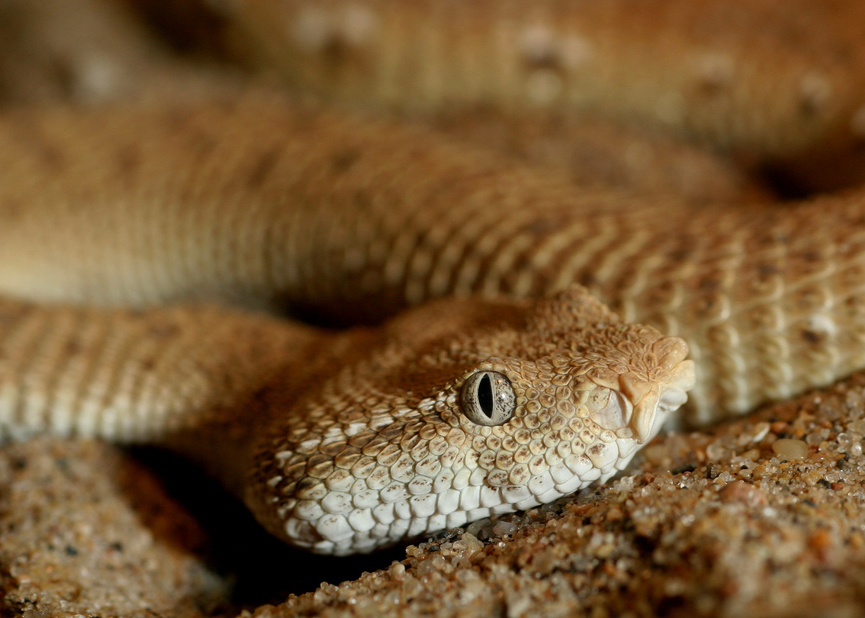
- Eristicophis macmahonii

Scientific classification
- Kingdom: Animalia
- Phylum: Chordata
- Class: Reptilia
- Order: Squamata
- Suborder: Serpentes
- Family: Viperidae
- Subfamily: Viperinae
- Genus: Eristicophis; Alcock & Finn, 1897
- Species: E. macmahonii

Binomial name
- Eristicophis macmahonii Alcock & Finn, 1897

Synonyms
- Eristicophis Alcock & Finn, 1897; Eristicophis — Wall, 1906; Eristicophis Macmahonii Alcock & Finn, 1897; Eristicophis macmahonii — Wall, 1906; Eristicophis macmahoni — Wall, 1925; Pseudocerastes latirostris Guibé, 1957; Pseudocerastes mcmahoni — Anderson, 1963; Eristicophis mcmahoni — Leviton, 1968; Eristophis macmohoni — Khole, 1991; Eristicophis macmahoni — Golay et al., 1993

= Eristicophis =

Genus of reptile

Eristicophis is a monotypic genus created for the viper species, Eristicophis macmahonii, which is endemic to the desert region of Balochistan near the borders of Iran, Pakistan, and Afghanistan. Common names for the species include McMahon's viper, Asian sand viper, leaf-nosed viper, and whiskered viper. Like all other vipers, it is venomous. No subspecies are recognized as being valid.

== Etymology ==
The specific name, macmahonii (or macmahoni), is in honor of the British diplomat Arthur Henry McMahon.

== Description ==
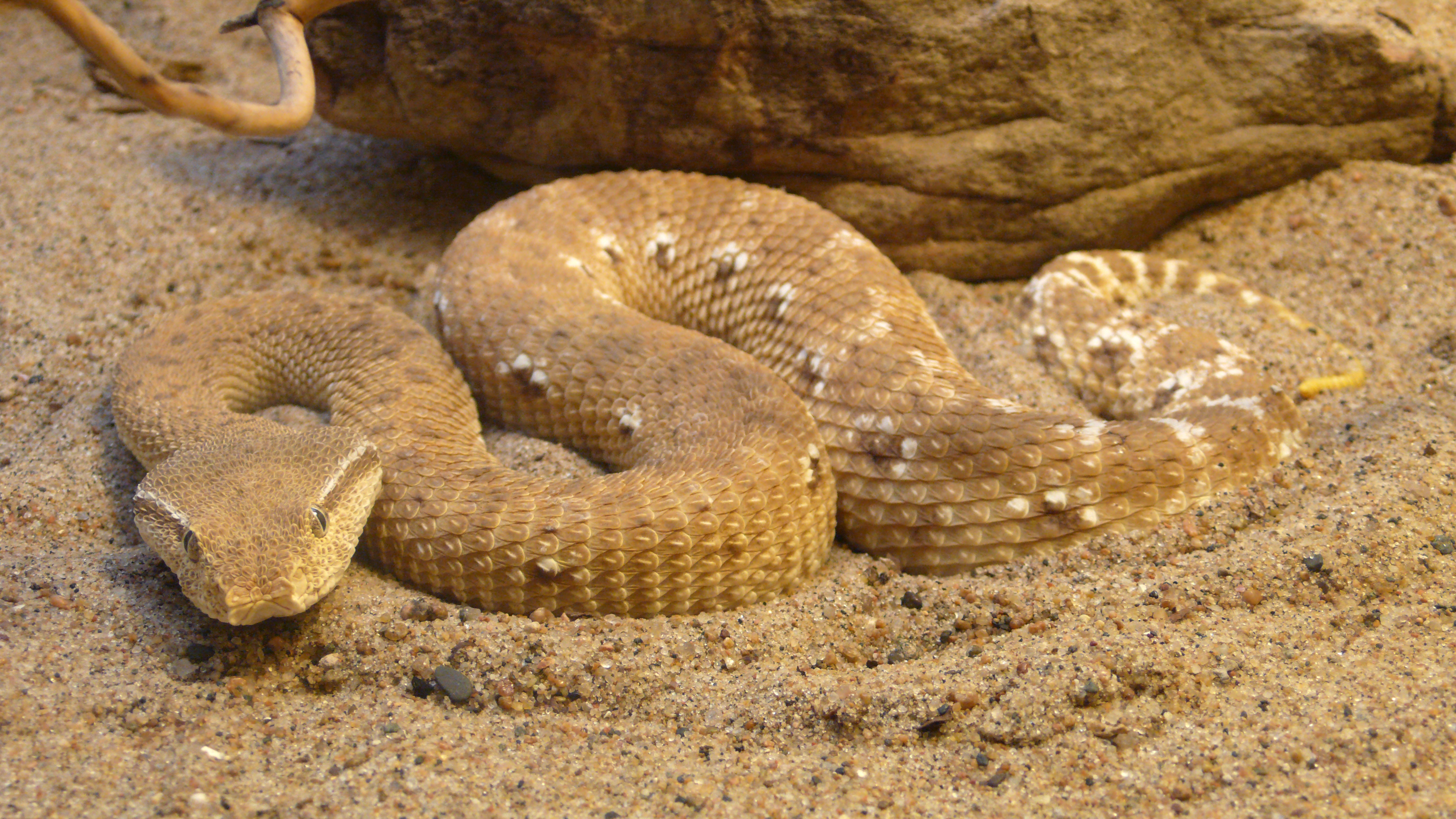
E. macmahonii

Eristicophis macmahonii is a relatively small species, growing to a total length (tail included) of less than 1 m (39 in). Males are 22–40 cm (8.7–15.7 in) in total length, the females 28–72 cm (11–28 in).

The head is large, broad, flat, and wedge-shaped. It is also distinct from the neck. The snout is broad and short. The eyes are of a moderate size. The crown of the head is covered with small scales. The nostrils are a pair of small slits. It has a characteristic rostral scale, that is wider than it is high, strongly concave, and bordered above and to the sides by four much enlarged nasorostral scales arranged in a butterfly shape. There are 14–16 supralabials, which are separated from the suboculars by 3–4 rows of small scales. There are 16–19 sublabials. The circumorbital ring consists of 16–25 scales.

The body is dorsoventrally slightly depressed and appears moderately to markedly stout. The tail is short, and prehensile, tapering abruptly behind the vent. The skin feels soft and loose. The dorsal scales are short and keeled, in 23–29 rows at midbody, and arranged in a straight and regular pattern. The ventral scales, numbering 140–144 in males and 142–148 in females, have lateral keels. The subcaudals are without keels: males have 33–36, females 29–31.

The color pattern consists of a reddish to yellowish brown ground color, overlaid dorsolaterally with a regular series of 20–25 dark spots, bordered partly or entirely with white scales. Posteriorly on the body, these spots become more distinct. The white border areas often extend over the back as crossbands. The head has a white stripe that runs from the back of the eye to the angle of the mouth. The top of the head may have scattered dark flecks. The labials and throat are white, as is the belly. The tip of the tail is yellow with distinct crossbands.

== Geographic distribution ==
Eristicophis macmahonii is found only in the desert region of Balochistan near the Iran-Afghanistan-Pakistan border.

The type-locality given is "Amirchah [Amir Cháh on map], 30th March, 3300 feet, Zeh, 1st April, 2500 feet, Drana Koh, 2nd April, Robat I., May, 4300 feet" (3300 ft = 1000 m, 2500 ft. = 760 m, 4300 ft. = 1300 m). Listed as "W. Baluchistan" in the catalogue of the Bombay Natural History Museum, Bombay India. Malcolm Arthur Smith (1943: 497) listed it as the "desert south of Helmand [River], in Baluchistan".

According to Mallow et al. (2003), this species is reported from Pakistan, Afghanistan, eastern and northwestern Baluchistan, southern Iran, and India in the Rajasthan Desert. It is limited to the Dast-i Margo Desert and nearby dune areas, from Seistan in the extreme east of Iran into Afghanistan south of the Helmand River. It also occurs in Baluchistan, between the Chagai Hills and Siahan Range, east to Nushki.

== Habitat ==
Eristicophis macmahonii is associated with (shifting) dune habitats of fine, loose sand. It is not found at elevations above 1,300 m (4,300 ft).

== Behavior ==
Eristicophis macmahonii employs rectilinear and serpentine motion to move around, but will sidewind when moving over loose sand or when alarmed. Occasionally, it climbs into bushes using its prehensile tail. This species is mainly nocturnal, but may also be crepuscular. It is also said to be bad-tempered, hissing very loudly and deeply. It will raise the front part of its body off the ground in a loop and strike aggressively.

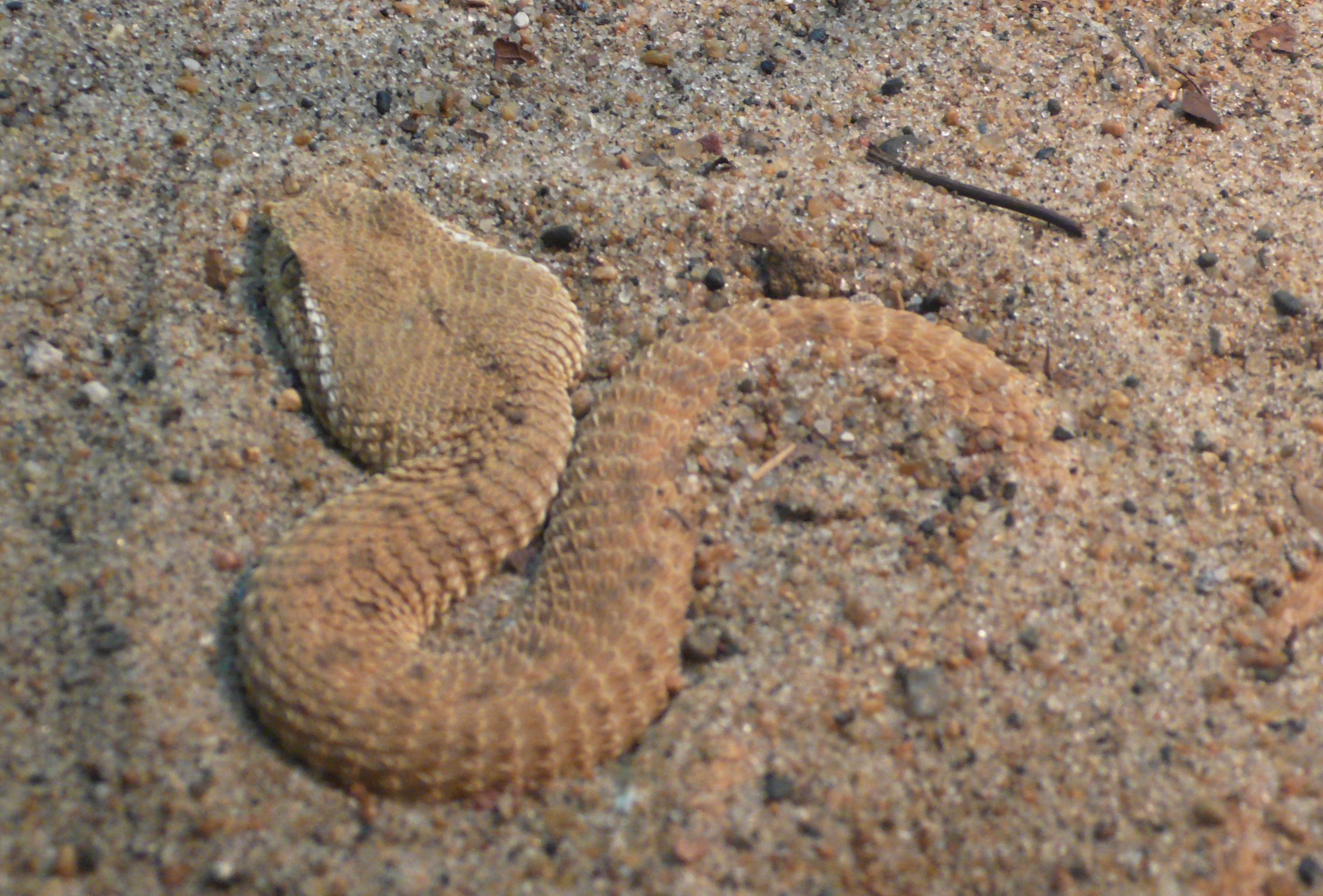
E. macmahonii buried in sand.

Eristicophis macmahoni can appear to sink down into the sand using a rocking or peristaltic motion. Following this, it will usually shake and rotate its head along the longitudinal axis to cover its head, leaving only its snout and eyes free of sand. It is thought that the enlarged nasorostral scales keep sand from entering the nostrils.

== Diet ==
Eristicophis macmahonii preys upon small lizards, small rodents, and sometimes birds. Mice are held in the mouth until dead, or nearly so.

== Reproduction ==
The species Eristicophis macmahonii is oviparous, laying up to a dozen eggs. These hatch after 6–8 weeks, with each hatchling being about 6 inches (15 cm) in total length.

== Venom ==
Relatively few data are available regarding the venom of Eristicophis macmahonii, but it is regarded as a potentially dangerous species by the United States Navy (1991) with venom similar to that of snakes of the genus Echis. However, a protein in its venom called eristostatin has been reported to help in the fight against melanoma.
