= Atheris anisolepis =

Conservation status
- Least Concern (IUCN 3.1)

Scientific classification
- Kingdom: Animalia
- Phylum: Chordata
- Class: Reptilia
- Order: Squamata
- Suborder: Serpentes
- Family: Viperidae
- Genus: Atheris
- Species: A. anisolepis

Binomial name
- Atheris anisolepis Mocquard, 1887

Synonyms
- Atheris squamigera anisolepis — Bogert, 1940

Species of snake

Atheris anisolepis, otherwise known as the Mayombe bush-viper, is a species of viper endemic to west-central Africa. No subspecies are currently recognized. The Atheris anisolepis is very similar to the Atheris squamigera but it is differentiated by the complete row of scales between the supralabial scales and the ocular scales as well as having enlarged, smooth, and/or weekly keeled scales. However, this differentiation does not always apply and may not always be accurate.

== Distribution ==
Atheris anisolepis is found in southern Gabon, southern Congo, and western Democratic Republic of Congo. It might be present in northern Angola, but was not listed as present by Marques and colleagues (2018).

== Habitat ==
Atheris anisolepis is an arboreal snake that is found in drier areas of shrub and woodland-savanna at elevations below 400 m (1,300 ft).
