= Montatheris =

- Montatheris hindii in Kenya

Scientific classification
- Kingdom: Animalia
- Phylum: Chordata
- Class: Reptilia
- Order: Squamata
- Suborder: Serpentes
- Family: Viperidae
- Subfamily: Viperinae
- Genus: Montatheris; Broadley, 1996
- Species: M. hindii

Binomial name
- Montatheris hindii (Boulenger, 1910)

Synonyms
- Genus synonymy: Vipera Laurenti, 1768 (part); Bitis Gray, 1842 (part); Atheris Cope, 1862 (part); Hindius A.F.T. Reuss, 1939 (nomen nudum); Montatheris Broadley, 1996; Species synonymy: Vipera hindii Boulenger, 1910; V[ipera]. hindei — Schwarz, 1936; Hindius hindii — A.F.T. Reuss, 1939 (nomen nudum); Bitis hindii — Kramer, 1961; Atheris hindii — Marx & Rabb, 1965; Montatheris hindii — Broadley, 1996

Genus of snakes

Montatheris is a monotypic genus created for the viper species, Montatheris hindii, a venomous snake also known by the common names Kenya mountain viper, Kenya montane viper, montane viper, and Hind's viper. This is a small terrestrial species endemic to Kenya. There are no subspecies which are recognized as being valid.

== Etymology ==
The specific name, hindii, is in honor of Sidney Langford Hinde, a British military medical officer and naturalist.

== Description ==
M. hindii is a small species reaching an average total length (including tail) of 20–30 cm (7.9–11.8 in) and a maximum total length of about 35 cm (14 in). The head is elongated and not very distinct from the neck, while the eyes are small and set in a rather forwards position. The dorsal scales are strongly keeled.

== Geographic range ==
M. hindii is known only from isolated populations at high elevations on Mount Kenya and the moorlands of the Kinangop Plateau, Aberdare Mountains.

The type locality listed is "Fort Hall, Kenya District, 4000 ft." Since Fort Hall is at an altitude of only 4,000 feet (1,219 meters), Loveridge (1957) questioned whether this was accurate.

== Habitat ==
M. hindii occurs at high elevations of 2,700–3,800 m (8,900–12,500 ft) in treeless moorlands. It favors clumps of bunch grass for cover.

== Behavior ==
A terrestrial species, because of the low nighttime temperatures in its native habitat, M. hindii is only active during the day and when there is enough sunlight to warm its environment.

== Feeding ==
M. hindii feeds on chameleons, skinks, and small frogs. It may also take small rodents.

== Reproduction ==
This species, M. hindii, is apparently viviparous (ovoviviparous). One wild-caught female produced two young in late January, while another gave birth to three in May. The total length of each newborn was 10–13 cm (3.9–5.1 in).
