= Proatheris =

Scientific classification
- Kingdom: Animalia
- Phylum: Chordata
- Class: Reptilia
- Order: Squamata
- Suborder: Serpentes
- Family: Viperidae
- Genus: Proatheris; Broadley, 1996
- Species: P. superciliaris

Binomial name
- Proatheris superciliaris (W. Peters, 1854)

Synonyms
- Proatheris Broadley, 1996; Vipera superciliaris W. Peters, 1854; Bitis superciliaris — Kramer, 1961; Atheris superciliaris — Marx & Rabb, 1965; Proatheris superciliaris — Broadley, 1996

Genus of snakes

Proatheris (commonly referred to as the lowland viper and swamp viper among other names) is a monotypic genus created for the viper species, Proatheris superciliaris. This is a small terrestrial species endemic to East Africa. Like all other vipers, it is venomous. No subspecies are currently recognized.

== Description ==
Proatheris superciliaris is a small species that averages 40 to 50 cm (about 16 to 20 inches) in total length (body + tail), with a maximum total length of 61 cm (24 in). The females are slightly larger than the males. The head has a somewhat elongated appearance, the top of which is covered with small scales except for a pair of large supraocular scales, which are almost twice as long as they are wide.

== Common names ==
Common names for the Proatheris include the lowland viper, swamp viper, lowland swamp viper, eyebrow viper, swamp adder, Peter's viper, flood-plain viper, Mozambique viper, African lowland viper, and the domino viper.

== Geographic range ==
It is found in East Africa. The southern part of its range begins near Beira, in central Mozambique, extends up north over the Mozambique Plain to Quissanga, and through Malawi and as far north as the floodplains of southern Tanzania at the northern end of Lake Malawi.

The type locality given is "Terra Querimba" (= Quissanga mainland opposite Ilha Quirimba, Mozambique).

Its range is apparently centered on the lower section of the Zambezi River and spreads out into the coastal plain of central Mozambique and the Shire Valley to Lake Chilwa and Malawi. However, other specimens have been found far from this region, such as in Cape Delgado Province, in north-eastern Mozambique, and Mwaya in south-western Tanzania.

== Habitat ==
It is almost always found in low-lying marshes, floodplains and land frequently used for grazing cattle. The soil is never too dry, since this would make it difficult for the rodents that they feed on to dig their burrows. These snakes are entirely terrestrial and are usually found in or around these rodent burrows.

== Behaviour ==
One of the distinguishing characteristics of the Atheris group (to which Proatheris is closely related), is that they have prehensile tails. With Proatheris, the young and subadults have this capability, but it is diminished in the adults.

== Feeding ==
Preys mainly on small frogs and toads. Occasionally, it also feeds on small rodents.

== Reproduction ==
This species is viviparous, with typically 3-16 neonates.

== Venom ==
The first known case of a survivor of snakebite by this species was reported by Els (1988), involving a 20 cm (7.9 in) juvenile and 24-year-old victim penetrated by a single fang. The results were painful, but there were none of the strongly hemotoxic symptoms that had been associated with Atheris venom up to that point.

In a second case in 1996, a victim experienced severe hemolysis and complete platelet destruction after which his liver and kidneys began to fail. When it was feared that the patient might die from hemolytic-uremic syndrome, plasmapheresis was performed. Luckily, the patient survived, but it is now obvious that P. superciliaris venom is very hemotoxic.

== Taxonomy ==
This species was previously placed in the genus Atheris based on skull characteristics and because of its partially prehensile tail.

== Etymology ==
The generic name, Proatheris, is Latin for "before-atheris".
