= Interorbital scales =

In snakes, the interorbital scales, or intersupraoculars, are the scales on the top of the head between the plates surmounting the eyes (the supraoculars).

== See also ==
- Supraocular scales
- Snake scales
