= Donald George Broadley =

African herpetologist (1932–2016)

- Born: 1932
- Died: 2016 (aged 83–84)
- Education: University of Natal (PhD, 1966)
- Organizations: Herpetological Association of Africa
- Known for: Description of reptiles (115 species and subspecies; 8 genera and subgenera)
- Spouse: Sheila Broadley
- Scientific career
- Fields: Herpetology

Donald George Broadley (1932–2016) was an African herpetologist. He described as new to science 115 species and subspecies, and 8 genera and subgenera of reptiles. He was one of the founders of the Herpetological Association of Africa (initially the Herpetological Association of Rhodesia). He earned his doctorate at the University of Natal in 1966. His widow, Sheila Broadley, is also a herpetologist.

== Legacy ==
Broadley is commemorated in the scientific names of eight species of reptiles: Afroedura broadleyi, Atheris broadleyi, Elapsoidea broadleyi, Lygodactylus broadleyi, Pelusios broadleyi, Platysaurus broadleyi, Scolecoseps broadleyi, and Tricheilostoma broadleyi.
