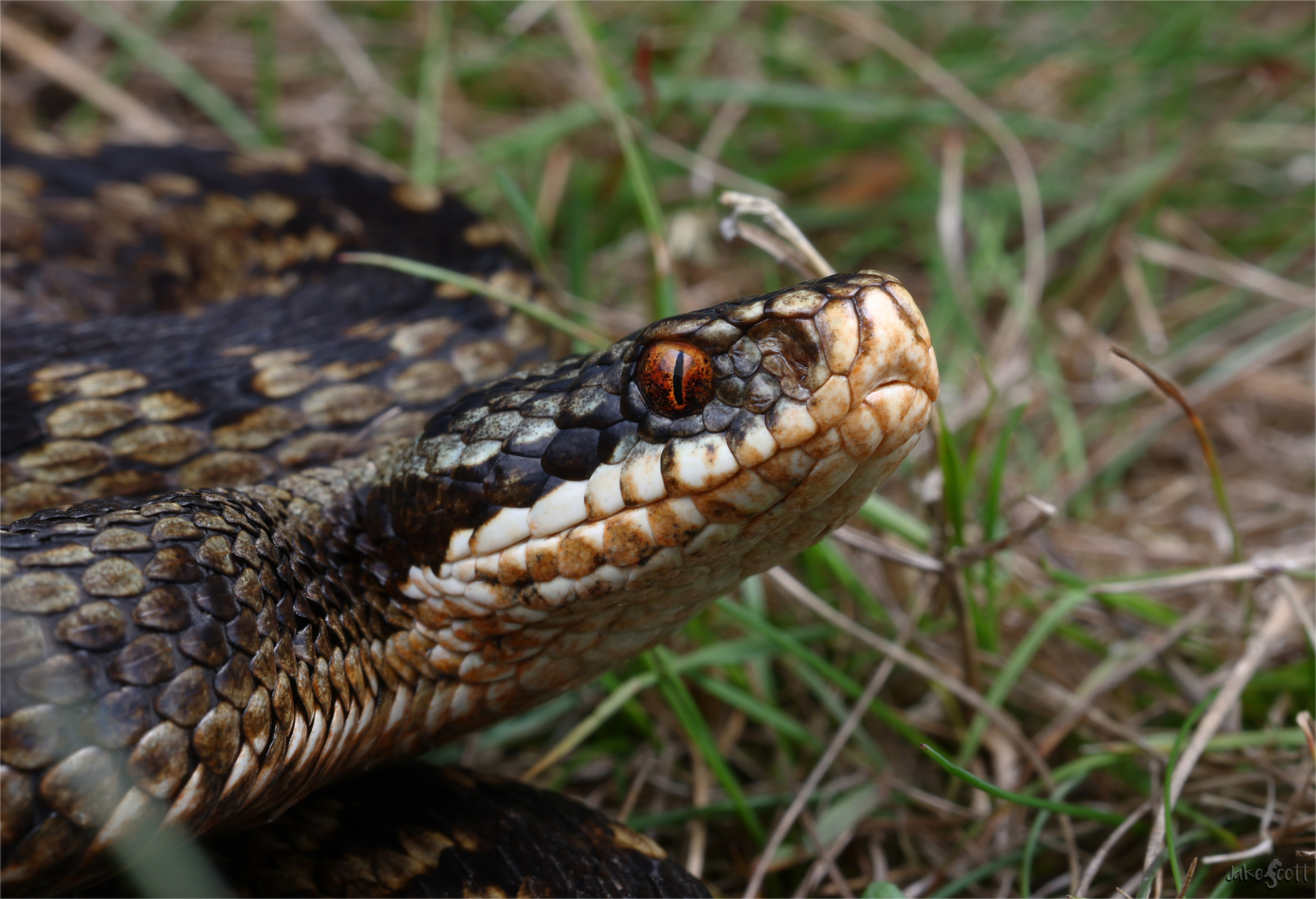
- European adder (Vipera berus), a viperine

Scientific classification
- Kingdom: Animalia
- Phylum: Chordata
- Class: Reptilia
- Order: Squamata
- Suborder: Serpentes
- Family: Viperidae
- Subfamily: Viperinae; Oppel, 1811

Synonyms
- Viperini Oppel, 1811; Viperes Cuvier, 1817; Viperides Latreille, 1825; Viperina Gray, 1825; Viperiodea Fitzinger, 1826; Viperiodei Eichwald, 1831; Viperiformes Günther, 1864; Viperida Strauch, 1869; Atherini Broadley, 1996

= Viperinae =

Subfamily of snakes

Viperinae, or viperines, are a subfamily of vipers endemic to Europe, Asia and Africa. They are distinguished by their lack of the heat-sensing pit organs that characterize their sister group, the subfamily Crotalinae. Currently, 13 genera are recognized. Most are tropical and subtropical, although one species, Vipera berus, even occurs within the Arctic Circle. Like all vipers, they are venomous.

The common names "pitless vipers", "true vipers", "Old World vipers", and "true adders" all refer to this group.

== Description ==
Members of this subfamily range in size from Bitis schneideri, which grows to a maximum total length (body and tail) of 280 mm (11 in), to the Gaboon viper, which reaches a maximum total length of over 2 m (6.6 ft). Most species are terrestrial, but a few, such as those of the genus Atheris, are completely arboreal.

Although the heat-sensing pits that characterize the Crotalinae are clearly lacking in the viperines, a supernasal sac with sensory function has been described in a number of species. This sac is an invagination of the skin between the supranasal and nasal scales and is connected to the ophthalmic branch of the trigeminal nerve. The nerve endings here resemble those in the labial pits of boas. The supernasal sac is present in the genera Daboia, Pseudocerastes and Causus, but is especially well developed in the genus Bitis. Experiments have shown that strikes are not only guided by visual and chemical cues, but also by heat, with warmer targets being struck more frequently than colder ones.

== Geographic range ==
Viperinae are found in Europe, Asia, and Africa, but not in Madagascar.

== Reproduction ==
Generally, members of this subfamily are ovoviviparous, although a few, such as Pseudocerastes, Cerastes, and some Echis species are oviparous (egg-laying).

== Genera ==
Genus	Taxon author	Species	Common name	Geographic range
Atheris	Cope, 1862	18	Bush vipers	Tropical sub-Saharan Africa, excluding southern Africa.
Bitis	Gray, 1842	18	Puff adders	Africa and the southern Arabian Peninsula.
Cerastes	Laurenti, 1768	3	Horned vipers	North Africa eastward through Arabia and Iran.
Daboia	Gray, 1842	4	Day adders	Pakistan, India, Sri Lanka, Bangladesh, Nepal, Myanmar, Thailand, Cambodia, China (Guangxi and Guangdong), Taiwan and Indonesia (Ende, Flores, East Java, Komodo, Lomblen islands).
Echis	Merrem, 1820	12	Saw-scaled vipers	India and Sri Lanka, parts of the Middle East and Africa north of the equator.
Eristicophis	Alcock and Finn, 1897	1	McMahon's viper	The desert region of Balochistan near the Iran-Afghanistan-Pakistan border.
Macrovipera	Reuss, 1927	2	Large Palearctic vipers	Semideserts and steppes of Northern Africa, the Near and Middle East, and Milos in the Aegean Sea.
Montatheris	Broadley, 1996	1	Kenya mountain viper	Kenya: moorlands of the Aberdare Range and Mount Kenya above 3,000 m (9,800 ft).
Montivipera	Nilson, Tuniyev, Andren, Orlov, Joger, & Herrmann, 1999	8	Upland vipers	Middle East
Proatheris	Broadley, 1996	1	Lowland viper	Floodplains from southern Tanzania (northern end of Lake Malawi) through Malawi to near Beira, central Mozambique.
Pseudocerastes	Boulenger, 1896	3	False-horned vipers	From the Sinai of Egypt eastward to Pakistan.
Vipera (Note: Type genus)	Laurenti, 1768	21	Palearctic vipers	Great Britain and nearly all of continental Europe across the Arctic Circle and on some islands in the Mediterranean (Elba, Montecristo, Sicily) and Aegean Sea eastward across Northern Asia to Sakhalin and North Korea. Also found in Northern Africa in Morocco, Algeria and Tunisia.

== Taxonomy ==
In the last 50 years, two genera previously included in the Viperinae were considered so distinctive within the Viperidae that separate subfamilies were created for them:

- Genus Azemiops — moved to subfamily Azemiopinae by Liem, Marx & Rabb (1971).
- Genus Causus — recognition of subfamily Causinae Cope, 1860 was proposed by Groombridge (1987) and further supported by Cadle (1992).

Nevertheless, these groups, together with the genera currently recognized as belonging to the Viperinae, are still often referred to collectively as the true vipers.

Broadley (1996) recognized a new tribe, Atherini, for the genera Atheris, Adenorhinos, Montatheris and Proatheris, the type genus for which is Atheris.

== See also ==
- List of viperine species and subspecies
