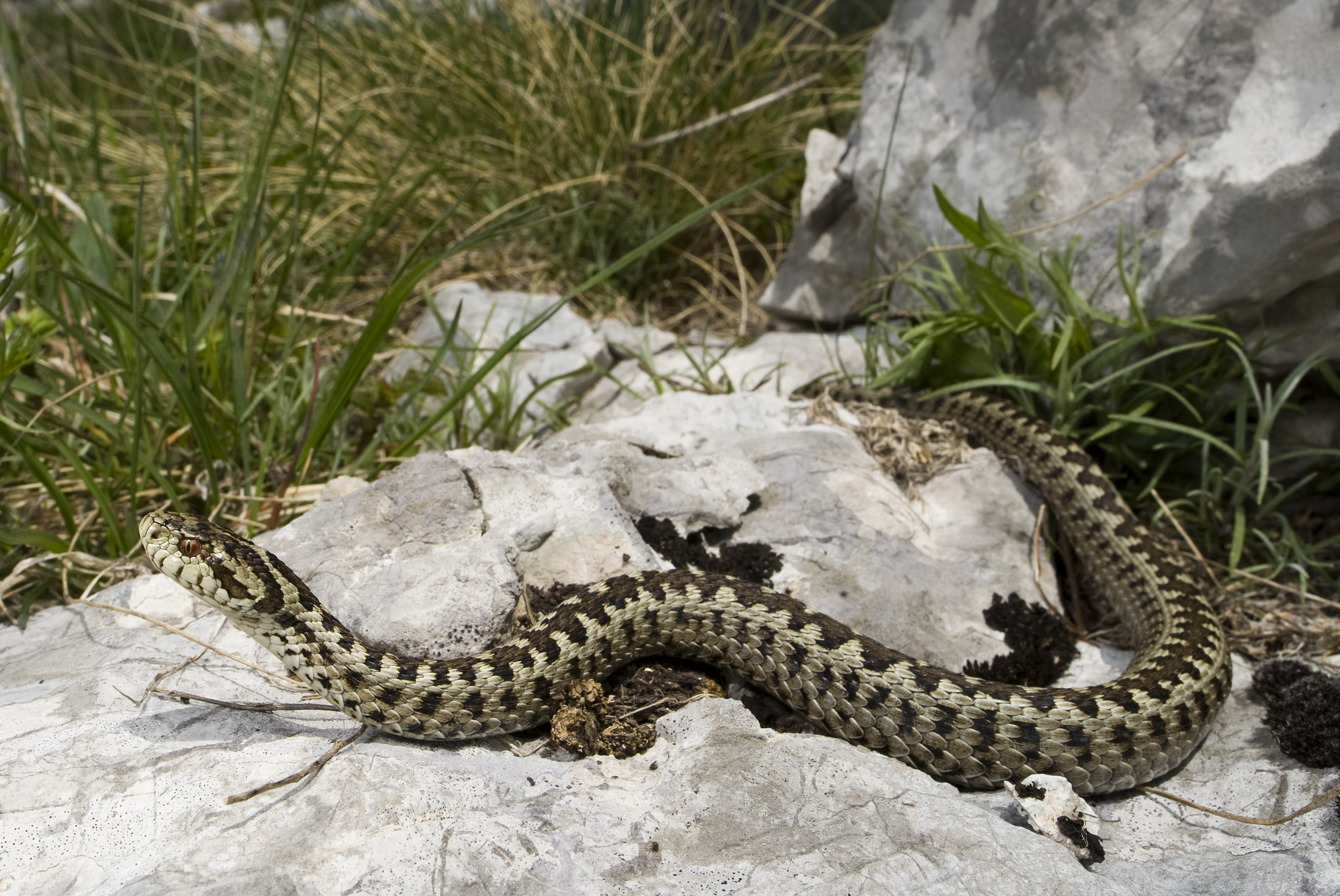

Conservation status
- Vulnerable (IUCN 3.1)
- CITES Appendix I (Note: Only populations of Europe, except areas that formerly constituted the USSR (populations in that area, and all other areas, are not included in the Appendices).)

Scientific classification
- Kingdom: Animalia
- Phylum: Chordata
- Class: Reptilia
- Order: Squamata
- Suborder: Serpentes
- Family: Viperidae
- Genus: Vipera
- Species: V. ursinii

Binomial name
- Vipera ursinii (Bonaparte, 1835)

Synonyms
- Coluber foetidus Güldenstädt In Georgi, 1801; Pelias Ursinii Bonaparte, 1835; [P[elias]. berus] Var. Ursinii — Cope, 1860; Pelias chersea vel Ursinii — Cope, 1860; Pelias Renardi Christoph, 1861; [Vipera berus] var. rákosiensis Méhelÿ, 1893; Vipera ursinii — Boulenger, 1893; Vipera renardi — Boulenger, 1893; Vipera ursinii var. rakosiensis Méhely, 1894; Vipera ursinii — Boulenger, 1896; Vipera renardi — Boulenger, 1896; Vipera macrops Méhely, 1911; Vipera ursinii macrops — Bolkay, 1924; Vipera (Pelias) ursinii forma trans. rudolphi A.F. Reuss, 1924; Acridophaga ursinii — A.F. Reuss, 1927; Vipera ursinii ursinii — L. Müller, 1927; Coluber ursinoides Nikolsky, 1927; Peilas berus var. uralensis A.F. Reuss, 1929 (nomen nudum); Acridophaga uralensis — A.F. Reuss, 1929; Vipera berus var. rakosiensis — F. Werner, 1929; A[cridophaga]. (renardi) eriwanensis A.F. Reuss, 1933; Vipera ursinii renardi — Schwarz, 1936; Vipera ursinii macrops — Schwarz, 1936; Acridophaga ursini — F. Werner, 1938; Vipera berus var. renardi — Başoğlu, 1947; Vipera ursinii rakosiensis — Knoepffler & Sochurek, 1955; Vipera ursinii ebneri Knoepffler & Sochurek, 1955; Vipera ursinii wettsteini Knoepffler & Sochurek, 1955; Vipera orsinii Ghidini, 1958; Vipera ursinii ursinii — Kramer, 1961; Vipera ursinii rudolphi Kramer, 1961; Acridophaga eriwanensis — Kramer, 1961; Vipera ursinii anatolica Eiselt & Baran, 1970; Vipera ursinii renardi — Saint-Girons, 1978; Vipera (Vipera) ursinii ursinii — Obst, 1983; Vipera (Vipera) ursinii macrops — Obst, 1983; Vipera (Vipera) ursinii rakosiensis — Obst, 1983; Vipera (Vipera) ursinii renardi — Obst, 1983; Vipera (Vipera) ursinii wettsteini — Obst, 1983; Vipera ursinii eriwanensis — Nilson, Andrén & Flärdh, 1988; Vipera ursinii graeca Nilson & Andrén, 1988; V[ipera]. ursinii rakoniensis — González, 1991; Vipera ursinii — Latifi, 1991; Vipera ursinii moldavica Nilson, Andrén & Joger, 1993

= Vipera ursinii =

Species of snake

Vipera ursinii is a species of venomous snake in the subfamily Viperinae of the family Viperidae. It is a very rare species, which is in danger of extinction. This species is commonly called the meadow viper, Orsini's viper, Ursini's viper, and the meadow adder. It is found in southeast France, the central Apennines in Italy, as well as fragmented areas of eastern Europe. Several subspecies are recognised.

== Etymology ==
The specific name or epithet, ursinii, is in honour of Italian naturalist Antonio Orsini (1788–1870).

== Description ==
Adults of Vipera ursini average 40–50 cm (16–20 inches) in total length (tail included), although specimens of 63–80 cm (25–31 inches) in total length have been reported. Females are larger than males. Although sometimes confused with V. aspis or V. berus, it differs from them in the following characters. The smallest viper in Europe, its body is thick, its head narrow, and its appearance rough. The snout is not upturned. There are always several large scales or plates on the top of the head. The prominently keeled dorsal scales are in only 19 rows, and often dark skin shows between them. It is grey, tan, or yellowish with a dark undulating dorsal stripe, which is edged with black.

== Common names ==
Common names for Vipera ursinii include meadow viper, Ursini's viper, meadow adder, Orsini's viper, field viper, field adder. Although the following subspecies are currently invalid according to the taxonomy used here, their common names may still be encountered:

- V. u. ursinii – Italian meadow viper.
- V. u. macrops – karst viper, karst adder.
- V. u. rakosiensis – Danubian meadow viper.
- V. renardi – steppe viper, steppe adder, Renard's viper.
- V. u. moldavica – Moldavian meadow viper.

== Geographic distribution ==
Vipera ursinii is found in southeastern France, eastern Austria (extirpated), Hungary, central Italy, Serbia, Montenegro, Croatia, Bosnia and Herzegovina, northern and northeastern Republic of Kosovo, North Macedonia, Albania and Romania. The species has likely gone extinct in Bulgaria, Moldova and Ukraine. It is close to extinction in Hungary and a record from southeast Ukraine is questioned.

Vipera ursinii rakosiensis is native to Hungary although the taxonomic status of this subspecies is disputed (see section "Taxonomy")

The type locality is " ...monti dell'Abruzzo prossimi alla provincia d'Ascoli... " (...mountains of Abruzzo near the Province of Ascoli Piceno, Italy...).

== Conservation status ==
The species Vipera ursinii is considered to be a Vulnerable species on the IUCN Red List of Threatened Species, due to habitat destruction caused by changes in agricultural practices and climate change in mountain areas, and to collection for the pet trade.

In addition, this species is listed on CITES Appendix I, which prohibits commercial international trade, and is a strictly protected species (Appendix II) under the Berne Convention.

V. ursinii is the most threatened snake in Europe. At least 12 human activities are threatening these animals:

1. Grazing
2. Mowing
3. Fire
4. Agriculture
5. Roads
6. Constructions
7. Leisure Activities
8. Afforestation
9. Cynegetic species management
10. Persecution
11. Illegal collection
12. Littering

== Taxonomy ==
There is high genetic diversity within samples of Vipera ursinii and several species may be involved. At least six subspecies may be encountered in modern literature:

- Vipera ursinii ursinii (Bonaparte, 1835)
- Vipera ursinii eriwanensis (A.F. Reuss, 1933)
- Vipera ursinii graeca Nilson & Andrén, 1988
- Vipera ursinii macrops Méhelÿ, 1911
- Vipera ursinii moldavica Nilson, Andrén & Joger, 1993
- Vipera ursinii rakosiensis Méhely, 1893
- Vipera ursinii renardi Christoph, 1861

Golay et al. (1993) recognise the first four, while Mallow et al. (2003) recognise five and list V. eriwanensis and V. renardi as valid species. However, McDiarmid et al. (1999), and thus ITIS, feel that more definitive data is necessary before any subspecies can be recognised. Presently there are four recognised subspecies of Vipera ursinii. Vipera eriwanensis, Vipera graeca, and Vipera renardi are all recognised as distinct species.
