= List of snake species in Albania =

List of snakes in Albania

This is the list of snake species that can be found in Albania.

List of snake species in Albania
Snake species	Albanian name	Family	Occurrence	Notes
European horned viper (Vipera ammodytes)	Nepërka	Viperidae	Commonly found from the sea coast to the mountains (up to 1800 m above sea level)	Most venomous snake in Europe
Balkan whip snake (Hierophis gemonensis)	Shigjeta e shkurtër	Colubridae	Commonly found throughout the entirety of Albania, up to 1100 m above sea level	
Grass snake (Natrix natrix)	Gjarpri i madh i ujit	Colubridae	Commonly found throughout the entirety of Albania	
Dice snake (Natrix tessellata)	Gjarpri i vogël i shiut	Colubridae	Commonly found throughout the entirety of Albania, in freshwater and brackish water habitats	
Dahl's whip snake (Coluber najadum)	Shigjeta i hollë	Colubridae	Found in west & southwestern Albania	
Eastern Montpellier snake (Malpolon insignitus)	Biroja	Psammophiidae	Commonly found alongside the coast of Albania, in the river valleys up to the mountains	
Caspian whipsnake (Dolichophis caspius)	Shigjeta e gjatë	Colubridae	Commonly found throughout the entirety of Albania excluding the north, up to 1500 m above sea level	
European ratsnake (Zamenis situla)	Bolla laramane	Colubridae	Rarely found, only in western Albania	
Aesculapian snake (Zamenis longissimus)	Bolla e shtëpisë	Colubridae	Commonly found throughout the entirety of Albania, from the coast to the mountains	
Four-lined snake (Elaphe quatuorlinea)	Bolla me katër vija	Colubridae	Mostly found in the west, rarely in the mountains	One of the longest snakes in Europe
European adder (Vipera berus)	Nepërka me lara e malit	Viperidae	Only found in the Northern Albanian Alps	
Meadow viper (Vipera ursinii)	Nepërka e vogël e malit	Viperidae	Only found in the Northern Albanian Alps and Korab Mountains	
Smooth snake (Coronella austriaca)	Gjarpri i zi	Colubridae	Only found in the Northern Albanian Alps and Korab Mountains	
European cat snake (Telescopus fallax)	Gjarpri laraman	Colubridae	Found in Western Albania	
Greek meadow viper (Vipera graeca)	?	Viperidae	Found near Himarë to the north of Berat and into Greece. Endangered.	Endangered
Javelin sand boa (Eryx jaculus)	Boa e rërës	Boidae	Rarely found, only in the south near Sarandë	
European blind snake (Xerotyphlops vermicularis)	Gjarpri i verbër krymbor	Typhlopidae	Commonly found in hilly country and plains	
