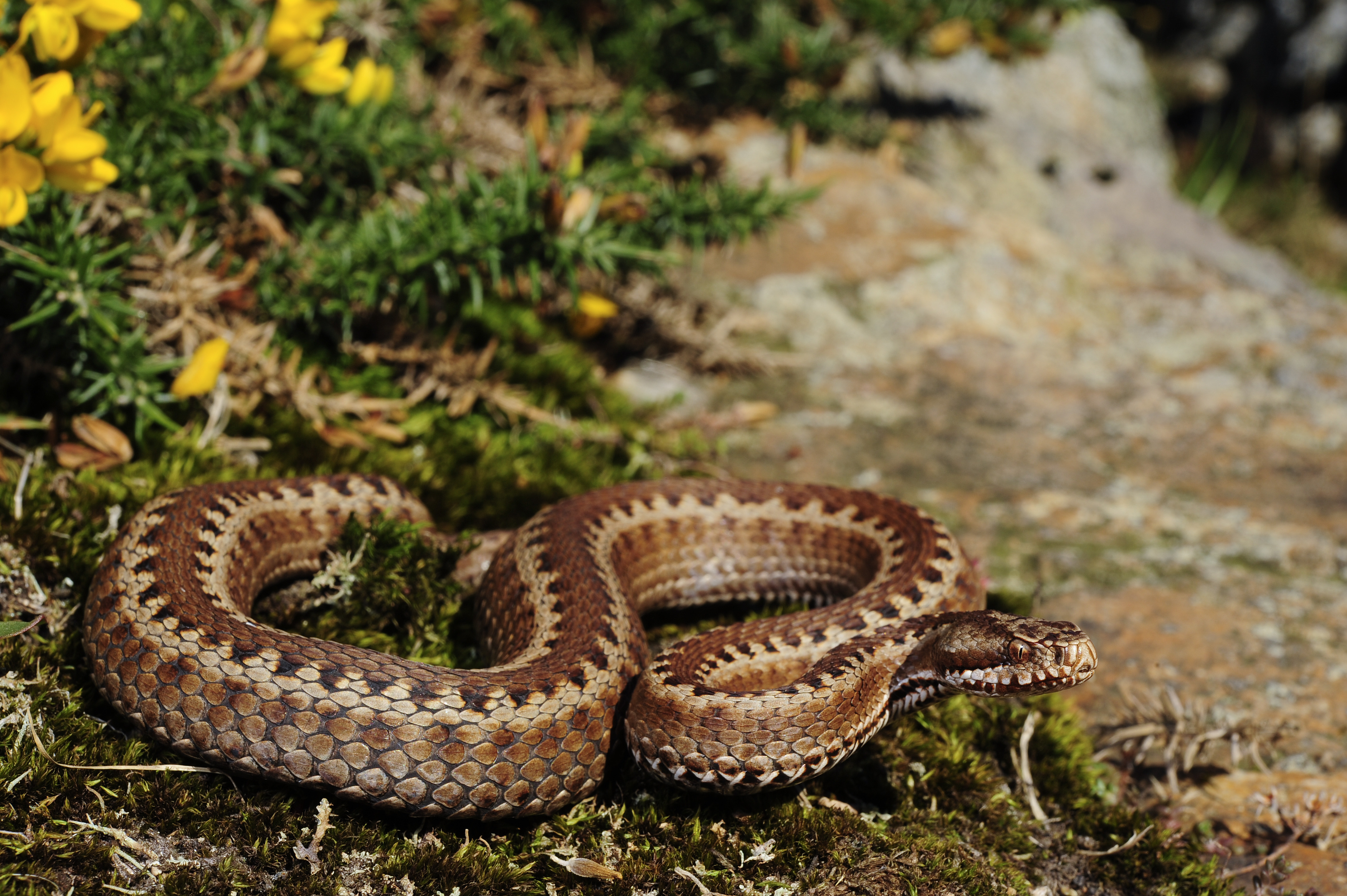

Conservation status
- Near Threatened (IUCN 3.1)

Scientific classification
- Kingdom: Animalia
- Phylum: Chordata
- Class: Reptilia
- Order: Squamata
- Suborder: Serpentes
- Family: Viperidae
- Genus: Vipera
- Species: V. seoanei

Binomial name
- Vipera seoanei Lataste, 1879
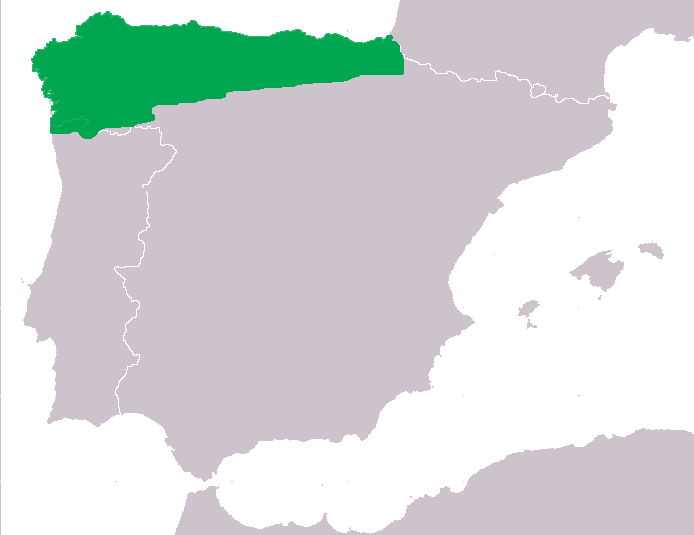
- Distribution of Vipera seoanei.

Synonyms
- Vipera berus seoanei Lataste, 1879; [Pelias] seoanei — A.F. Reuss, 1927; Vipera seoanei — Saint-Girons & Duguy, 1976; Vipera seoanei seoanei — Braña & Bas, 1983; Vipera (Vipera) seoanei — Obst, 1983; Vipera seoannei Bon, 1987 (ex errore); V[ipera]. seoanei latastei — González, 1991 (ex errore?)

= Vipera seoanei =

Species of snake

Common names: Baskian viper, Iberian cross adder, Portuguese viper, Seoane's viper.

Vipera seoanei is a venomous viper species native to extreme southwestern France and the northern regions of Spain and Portugal. Two subspecies are recognized as being valid, including the nominate race described here.

== Etymology ==
The specific name, seoanei, is in honor of Spanish naturalist Víctor López Seoane y Pardo-Montenegro.

== Description ==
Adults of Vipera seoanei may grow to a total length (tail included) of 75 cm (30 in), but usually less.

This is a highly polymorphic species for which four main color-pattern types have been described:

A: well-developed, brown zigzig pattern down the back, very much like V. berus, set against a beige or light-gray ground color.

B: roughly twin-striped pattern, with the ground color expressed as two narrow, straight, dorsolateral longitudinal lines along the body. Resembles V. kaznakovi to some degree.

C: uniform brownish morph with no pattern.

D: fragmented zigzag pattern (see V. s. cantabrica).

== Geographic distribution ==
Vipera seoanei is found in extreme southwestern France and the northern regions of Spain and Portugal.

The type locality is given as "In montibus Gallaecorum et Cantabrorum...d'Espagne" (the mountains of Galicia and Cantabrici, Spain).

Mertens and Müller (1928) suggested restricting the type locality to "Cabañas, Prov. Caruña, Spanien". According to Golay et al. (1993), this is Cabañas, near Ferrol, A Coruña province, northwestern Spain.

== Conservation status ==
This species, Vipera seoanei, is classified as Near Threatened (NT) according to the IUCN Red List of Threatened Species (v3.1, 2024). It was given this status due to its being subject to direct mortality primarily from persecution, but secondarily and significantly from roadkill. Year assessed: 2022.

It is, however, listed as a protected species (Appendix III) under the Berne Convention.

== Subspecies ==
Species	Taxon author	Geographic range
V. s. cantabrica	Braña & Bas, 1983	The Cantabrian Mountains of northern Spain.
V. s. seoanei	Lataste, 1879	Extreme southwestern France and the northern regions of Spain and Portugal.
