= Shopino Steppe =

- IUCN category IV (habitat/species management area)
- Location within Russia
- Location: Belgorod Oblast
- Nearest city: Belgorod
- Coordinates: 50°42′01″N 36°33′22″E
- Area: 3 hectares (7 acres; 0 sq mi)

Shopino Steppe is a botanical reserve of regional importance in the Belgorodsky District of Belgorod Oblast.

== Geographical location ==
Shopino Steppe lies on the western outskirts of the village Shopino, adjoining its eastern border to the highway Moscow-Simferopol. The total area is 3 hectares.

== Relief ==
Shopino Steppe is located on the steep northern slopes descending to the flood plain of the river Erik. In some places there are chalk outcrops.

== Flora and fauna ==
The variety of vegetation kept thanks to the large slope of the territory, which makes it difficult to visit the territory and economic activity on it. In Shopinskoy steppe grows 117 species of plants belonging to 29 families. The slope on which the botanical reserve, partly overgrown with woody vegetation - pine and birch. Also, it is found hawthorn. Among the herbaceous vegetation marked 7 species listed in the Red Book of the Belgorod region. This includes steppe species, (Stipa pennata, Astragalus albicaulis, Clematis integrifolia), meadow-steppe species, (wood anemone, Prunella grandiflora) and petrofitic steppe species characteristic of the сretaceous outcrop (Linum ucranicum, Asperula tephrocarpa).

Among the endangered species of animals presented meadow viper and forest-steppe adder.
