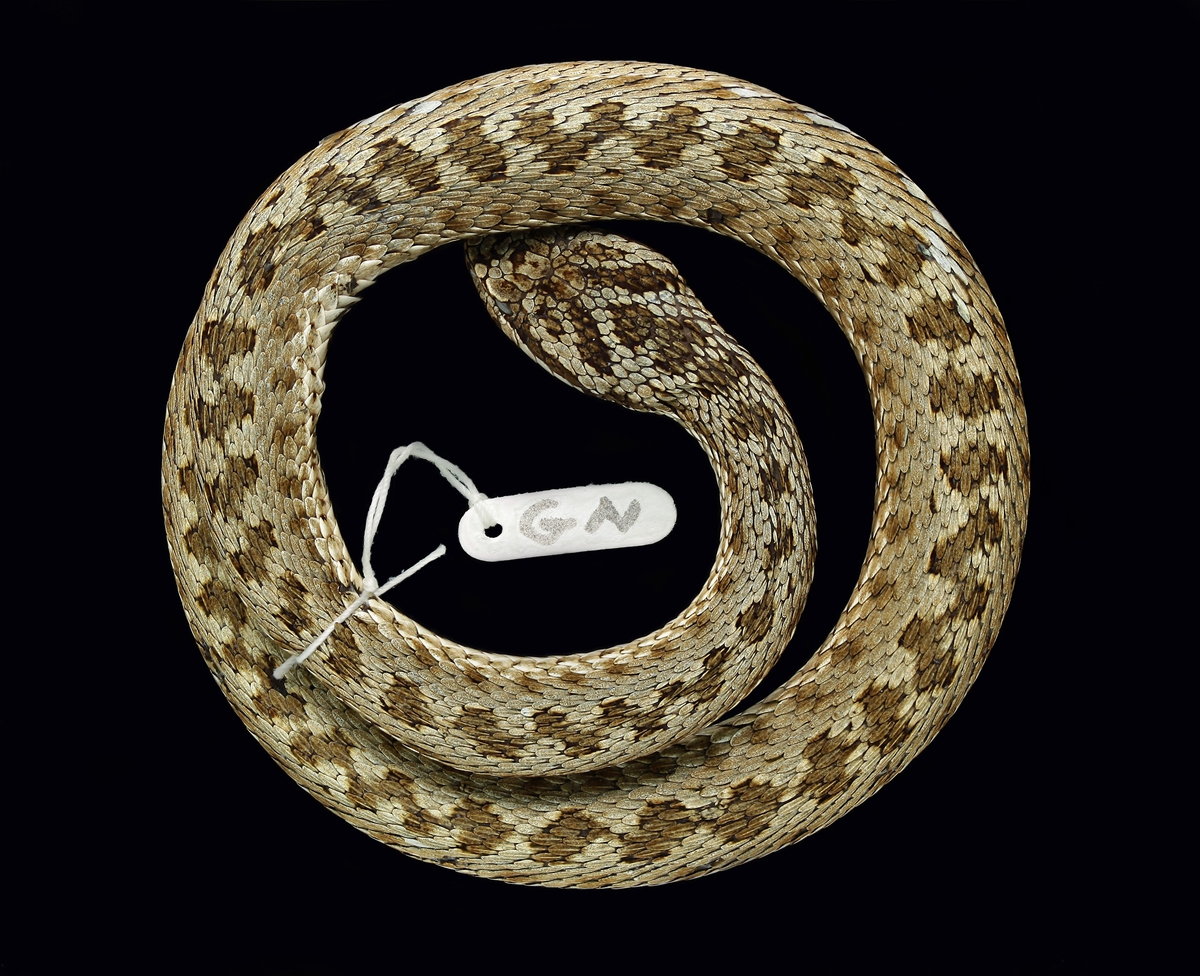

Scientific classification
- Kingdom: Animalia
- Phylum: Chordata
- Class: Reptilia
- Order: Squamata
- Suborder: Serpentes
- Family: Viperidae
- Genus: Vipera
- Species: V. altaica

Binomial name
- Vipera altaica Tuniyev, Nilson & Andrén, 2010

= Vipera altaica =

Species of snake

Vipera altaica, the Altai viper, is a hybridized species of viper, a mix between Vipera berus and Vipera renardi. It has been sighted very few times and only on the borders between Russia, Mongolia and Kazakhstan, all near or on the Altai Mountains. Sighted Altai vipers have been small or medium sized. Its name is derived from the mountain range it has been found in.

== Description ==
Altai vipers have been sighted as rather small or medium sized. They have a medium number of crown scales, along with many circumocular scales, with their preocular scales in contact with their nasal scales. They also have 18 supralabial scales, 9 on each side, and 20 sublabials, ten on each side. They are missing a nasal slit.

A special characteristic of the V. altaica species is that they have the highest number of ventral scales within the genus Vipera. It also has colouring typical of mountain species while usually being in the lowlands, as well as having unique sexual dimorphism, with dark sutures on male's labial scales and varying loreal scale numbers between males and females.

The body is covered in 21 rows of dorsal scales, and a high number of ventral scales.

The colouring of V. altaica is a uniquely non-bilineate ground color with a white belly and small lateral blotches and spots. The Altai Viper patten is a dark brown dorsal zigzag band.

== Distribution ==
Vipera altaica has been sighted officially four times. Once in Sagsai, Mongolia. Once in the Tarbagatay River valley, East Kazakhstan. Once in Ulaganskiy rayon, Russia. Once in Ongudayskiy rayon, Russia. Officially, it is local to the 218–327 metres (720–1,070 ft) elevation of the mountain ranges.

== Reproduction ==
The Altai viper reproduces sexually, with ovoviviparous birth.
