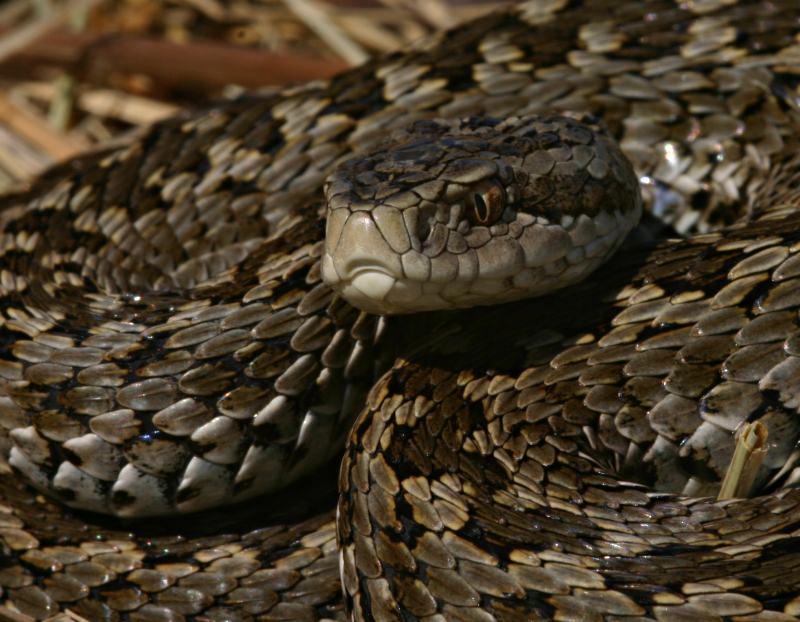

Conservation status
- Endangered (IUCN 3.1)

Scientific classification
- Kingdom: Animalia
- Phylum: Chordata
- Class: Reptilia
- Order: Squamata
- Suborder: Serpentes
- Family: Viperidae
- Genus: Vipera
- Species: V. ursinii
- Subspecies: V. u. rakosiensis

Trinomial name
- Vipera ursinii rakosiensis Méhelÿ, 1893

= Hungarian meadow viper =

Subspecies of snake

The Hungarian meadow viper (Vipera ursinii rakosiensis; Hungarian name: rákosi vipera), also called the Danubian meadow viper is one of the eight subspecies of the Vipera ursinii. It is an extremely rare venomous viper that can mostly be found in Hungary. The Hungarian meadow viper is the most endangered species in the whole Pannonian Basin. It was scientifically recorded for the first time in 1893 by Lajos Méhelÿ, Hungarian zoologist. In 2004, its entire Hungarian population was estimated to be below 500 specimens.

== Description ==
Adult Hungarian meadow vipers' length does not exceed 50 centimeters. Their heads are triangular due to the position of their venom glands at the temples. Their back's base color can be either light grey or straw-colored. They have a dark zig-zag pattern bordered by lighter lines. There are circular patches on the side of their bodies, which are of the same color as the zig-zag on their backs. Their tails are short, and in the case of females, it becomes thinner rather abruptly.

Like meadow vipers in general, they visually resemble the common European adder (Vipera berus), but are shorter. No difference can be observed between the male and female vipers' colors.

They are diurnal animals, meaning they are active during daytime. Their diet mostly consists of lizards and insects such as locusts. From October to March, they live in underground holes. The mating season takes place from late March to early April. The males typically fight each other over the females. They lay about 4–16 eggs, which hatch in late July. The offspring are 100–160 millimeters long at birth, and shed their skins within a few minutes after hatching. In their first year, they shed every 4–6 weeks, and later this becomes less frequent. Adults shed their skins three times a year.

== Distribution and habitat ==
Hungarian meadow vipers typically occur in plains. Formerly, they were present in parts of Austria, Hungary, and Romania as well. They once dwelt generally across the Great Hungarian Plain, but have since gotten close to extinction. Today they can be found living in smaller groups in the Hanság and in the Danube-Tisza Interfluve, specifically the Kiskunság. Less than ten populations are known in the Kiskunság, and two in the Hanság.

== Venom ==
The Hungarian meadow viper’s venom is relatively weak compared with that of most other European vipers. It does not pose a significant risk to healthy adult humans, although bites can cause mild to moderate symptoms, especially if an allergic reaction occurs. No human fatalities from Hungarian meadow viper bites have been documented.

== Conservation issues and planning ==
The depletion of Hungarian meadow viper populations is estimated to have begun about 300 years ago. The Danube-Tisza Interfluve used to have regular water coverage and larger areas were covered by pastures. By the turn of the twentieth century, the number of livestock had decreased in these areas, and a great ratio of pastures were plowed for growing crops instead. This process is said to have made the plain's scenery unrecognizable. Around the same time, intensive water management was conducted in the interfluve. These environmental changes have greatly decreased the habitat of the species. Up until the second half of the 20th century, these vipers were also hunted or illegally collected for selling them on the black market.

The species has been protected in Hungary since 1974. Being the country's most endangered vertebrate, its conservation value is 1 million Hungarian forints.

=== The CONVIPURSRAK project ===
In 2008, the European Commission started the CONVIPURSRAK [Conservation of Hungarian meadow viper (Vipera ursinii rakosiensis) in the Carpathian-basin] project as part of The LIFE Programme. The project ended in 2012. Although there had already been protection designations for the species, observations showed that the populations were still declining. The aim of the project was increasing the habitat size through grassland reconstruction and releasing vipers into natural habitats. The plans also included a public awareness programme with the cooperation of zoos.

The project was reported to have a successful outcome in increasing the population size of the viper and the size of its habitat by almost 400 ha, and the areas under administrative control of National parks in the Hanság and Kiskunság expanded. The vipers' captive breeding programme was also moved forward by the project. Many infrastructural improvements have been carried out, such were the renovation of the Hungarian Meadow Viper Conservation and Exhibition Centre and the establishment of a prey breeding center in the Budapest Zoo.
