= Vipera seoanei cantabrica =

Scientific classification
- Domain: Eukaryota
- Kingdom: Animalia
- Phylum: Chordata
- Class: Reptilia
- Order: Squamata
- Suborder: Serpentes
- Family: Viperidae
- Genus: Vipera
- Species: V. seoanei
- Subspecies: V. s. cantabrica

Trinomial name
- Vipera seoanei cantabrica Braña & Bas, 1983

Subspecies of snake

Common names: (none).

Vipera seoanei cantabrica is a venomous viper subspecies endemic to the Cantabrian Mountains in Spain.

== Description ==
This subspecies is described as the fourth (of four) main color-pattern types for V. seoanei—a highly polymorphic species. V. s. cantabrica has a fragmented zigzag pattern that can appear as transverse bands along the back. This morph resembles a pattern seen in V. aspis.

== Geographic range ==
It is found in the south central parts of the Cantabrian Mountains in northern Spain.

The type locality given is "Faro, Caurel (Lugo)."
