= Vipera sakoi =

Scientific classification
- Kingdom: Animalia
- Phylum: Chordata
- Class: Reptilia
- Order: Squamata
- Suborder: Serpentes
- Family: Viperidae
- Genus: Vipera
- Species: V. sakoi

Binomial name
- Vipera sakoi Tuniyev et al., 2018

Species of snake

Vipera sakoi, also known as Sako's viper, is a possible species of viper found in Turkey. These names are in honour of the son, friend and colleague of Tuniyev et al., Sako Tuniyev, who studied shield-headed snakes and died three years prior to the official description of the snake. The status of V. sakoi is uncertain as, while it is 4–5% genetically distinct from Vipera darevskii, their isolation from each other is uncertain. It is possible V. sakoi is a part of V. darevskii.

== Description ==
Sako's viper is generally a rather small species. Scale numbers depend on sex. Males have a small number of midbody and apical scales and a large number of preventral scales. Females, on the other hand, have a large number of ventral scales, as well as a small number of sublabial scales. Both sexes have a small number of shield scales. Vipers from the Erzincan area are unique from all other vipers by their small number of loreal scales and large number of supralabial scales.

In terms of patterning, females have a rather small number of zigzags, with a continuous pattern, while males have a larger number of disconnected zigzags. Dorsally, males are grey while females are light brown, and ventrally, females are light grey and males are dark-spotted. All Sako's Vipers have a white throat.

== Distribution ==
Vipera sakoi is generally found in the Gumuşhane District of Turkey. V. sakoi is typically found in areas with limestone rocks, taluses and shrubs.
