= Mountain viper =

Mountain viper may refer to:

- Macrovipera lebetinus, a.k.a. the Levant viper, a venomous species found in North Africa, much of the Middle East, and as far east as Kashmir
- Ovophis monticola, a.k.a. the mountain pitviper, a venomous species found in Asia
- Montivipera xanthina, a.k.a. the Ottoman viper, a venomous species found in northeastern Greece and Turkey, as well as certain islands in the Aegean Sea
- Vipera monticola, the Atlas mountain viper, a venomous species endemic in Morocco
