= Vipera tigrina =

Vipera tigrina may refer to:

- Vipera dinniki, a venomous viper species found in Russia, Georgia and Azerbaijan
- Bothrops lanceolatus, a venomous pitviper species found on the island of Martinique
