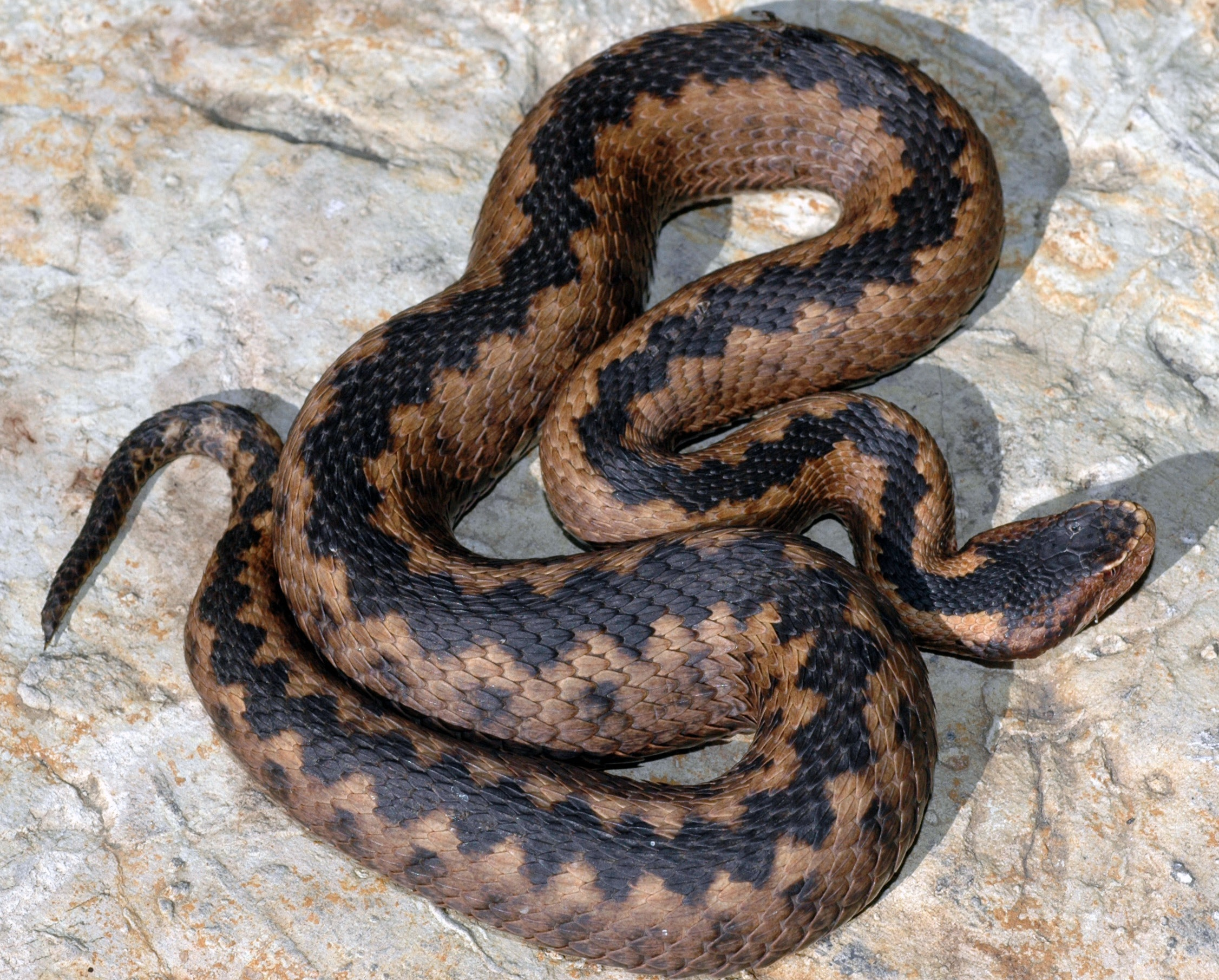

Conservation status
- Critically Endangered (IUCN 3.1)

Scientific classification
- Kingdom: Animalia
- Phylum: Chordata
- Class: Reptilia
- Order: Squamata
- Suborder: Serpentes
- Family: Viperidae
- Genus: Vipera
- Species: V. orlovi

Binomial name
- Vipera orlovi B. Tuniyev & Ostrovskikh, 2001
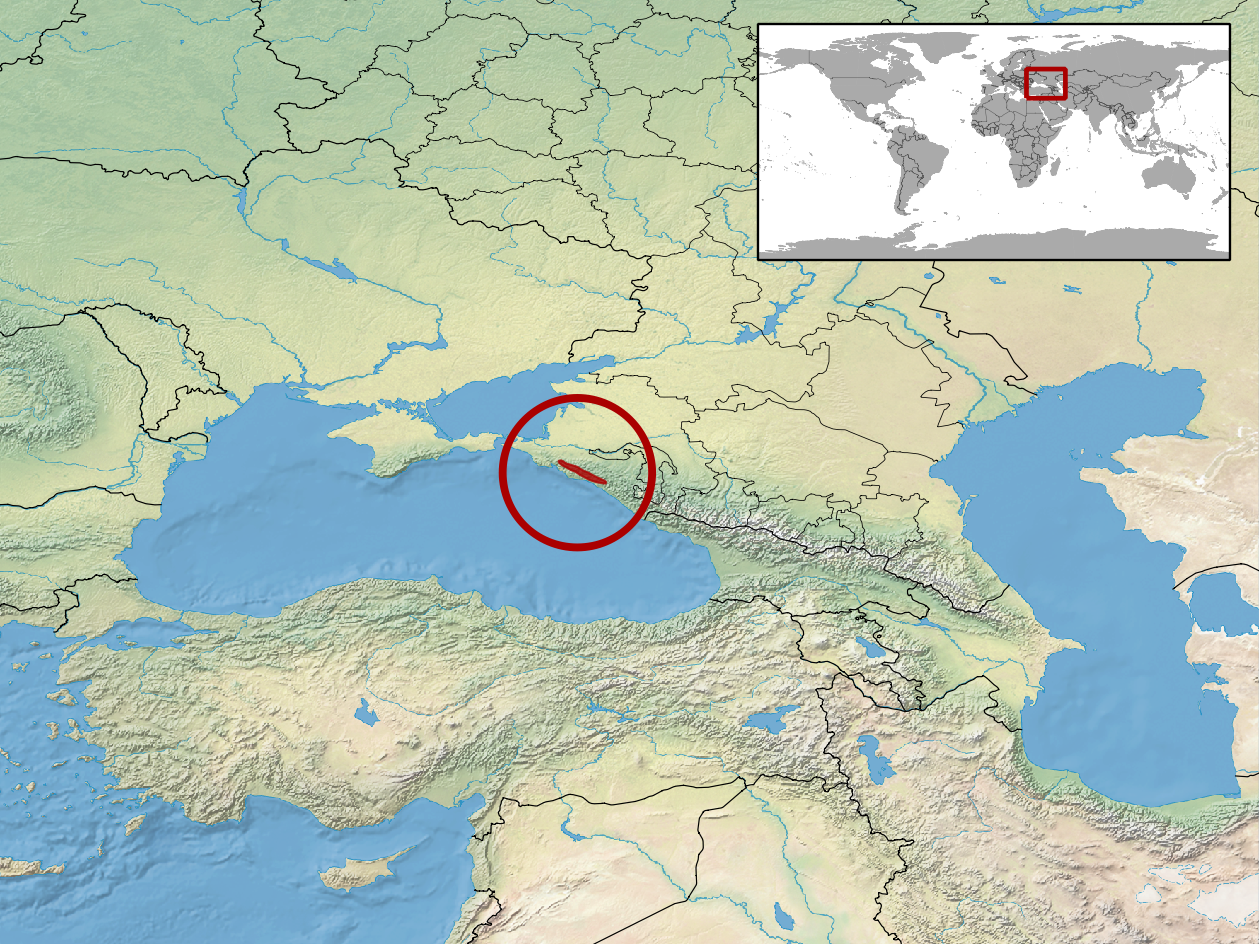

Synonyms
- Vipera orlovi B. Tuniyev & Ostroskikh, 2001; Vipera dinniki orlovi — Schweiger, 2009; Vipera orlovi — Li Vigni, 2013; Pelias orlovi — Wallach et al., 2014

= Vipera orlovi =

Species of snake

Vipera orlovi is a species of venomous snake in the subfamily Viperinae of the family Viperidae. The species is endemic to Russia.

== Taxonomy ==
Vipera orlovi was described as a species new to science by Boris S. Tuniyev and Sergei V. Ostrovskikh in 2001.

== Etymology ==
The specific name, orlovi, is in honor of Russian herpetologist Nikolai Liutsianovich Orlov (born 1952).

== Geographic range ==
Vipera orlovi is found in the Caucasus area of Russia.

== Habitat ==
The preferred habitats of Vipera orlovi are forest, grassland, and shrubland at altitudes of 200–950 m (660–3,120 ft).

== Reproduction ==
Vipera orlovi is ovoviviparous.
