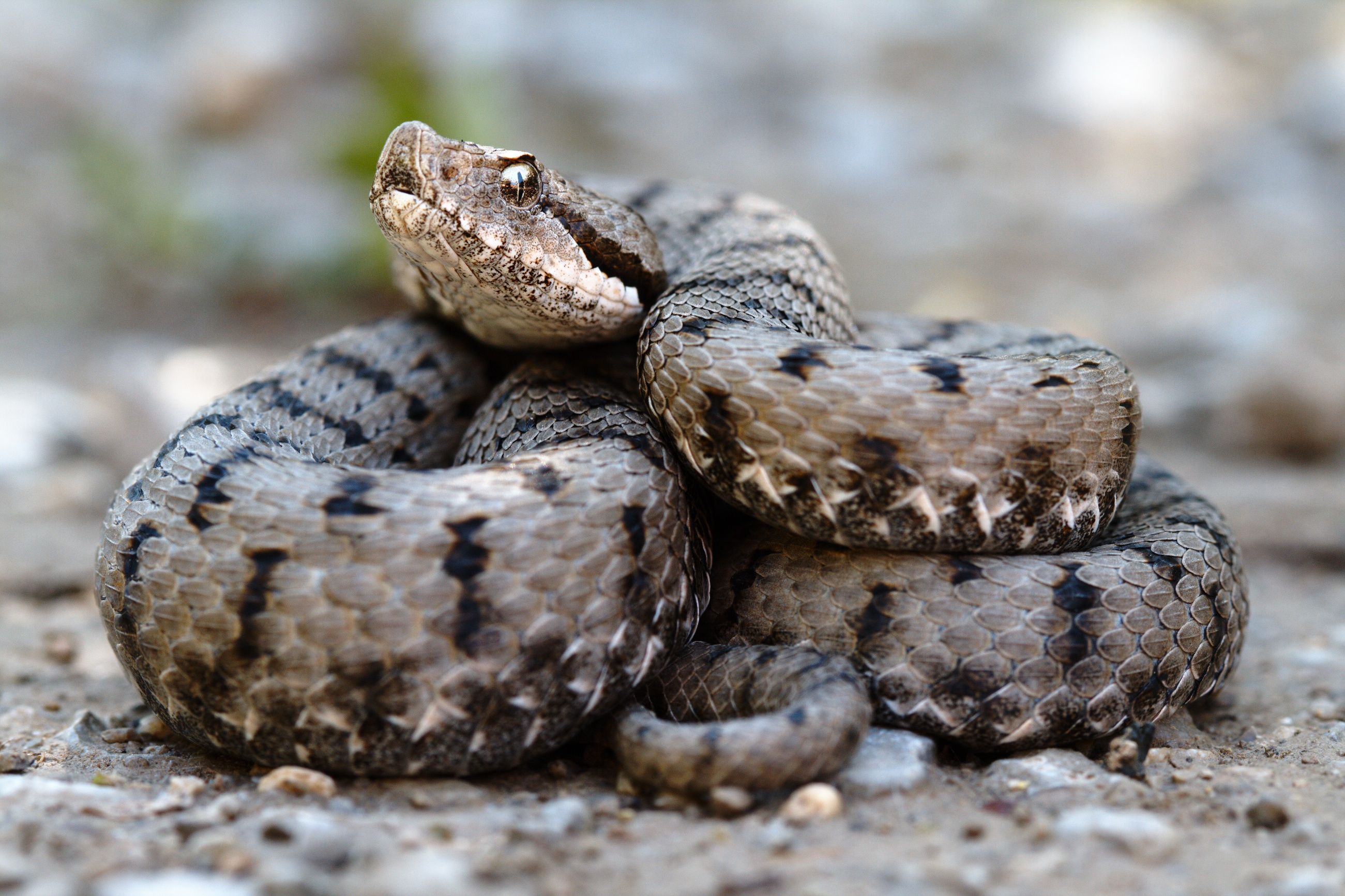
- Asp viper, V. aspis

Scientific classification
- Kingdom: Animalia
- Phylum: Chordata
- Class: Reptilia
- Order: Squamata
- Suborder: Serpentes
- Family: Viperidae
- Subfamily: Viperinae
- Genus: Vipera; Laurenti, 1768

Type species
- Coluber aspis Linnaeus, 1758

Synonyms
- List: Vipera Laurenti, 1768; Pelias Merrem, 1820; Chersea Fleming, 1822; Rhinaspis Bonaparte, 1834; Rhinechis Fitzinger, 1843; Echidnoides Mauduyt, 1844; Mesocoronis A.F. Reuss, 1927; Teleovipera A.F. Reuss, 1927; Acridophaga A.F. Reuss, 1927; Mesovipera A.F. Reuss, 1927; Mesohoronis A.F. Reuss, 1927; Mesohorinis A.F. Reuss, 1927; Latastea A.F. Reuss, 1929; Tzarevcsya A.F. Reuss, 1929; Latasteopara A.F. Reuss, 1935

= Vipera =

Vipera Temporal range: 22.5–0 Ma Early Miocene-Recent

Genus of snakes

Vipera (/ˈvɪpərə/; commonly known as the palaearctic vipers and Eurasian vipers) is a genus of snakes in the subfamily Viperinae of the family Viperidae. The genus has a very wide range, being found from North Africa to just within the Arctic Circle, and from Great Britain to Pacific Asia. The Latin name vīpera is possibly derived from the Latin words vivus and pario, meaning "alive" and "bear" or "bring forth"; likely a reference to the fact that most vipers bear live young. 21 species are recognized as being valid. Like all other vipers, the members of this genus are venomous.

== Description ==
Members of the genus Vipera tend to be stout and small in size. The largest of them, V. ammodytes, can reach a maximum total length (including tail) of 95 cm (37 in), and the smallest, V. monticola, reaches a maximum total length of 40 cm (16 in).

The head of the members of this genus is clearly distinct from the body, triangular in shape, and in most species covered in small scales. However, some species, notably V. berus, have small plates on the top of the head. Most species have large supraocular scales that tend to extend beyond the posterior margin of the eye. Some species also have some sort of "horn" on the head, either right behind the nasal scale, or behind the supraocular scales.

The color scheme and camouflage of the members of this genus vary widely, from a grayish ground color with dark brown transverse bands to browner colors with grey transverse bands edged with black in the case of V. ammodytes.

== Geographic range ==
Vipera species can be found all around the Old World, hence the common name of the genus, "Old World vipers". They can be found most notably in Europe, from Portugal to Turkey. They can also be found on some islands in the Mediterranean Sea (Sicily, Elba and Montecristo), and in Great Britain. They can also be found in the Maghreb region of Africa with species living in Morocco (V. monticola) and northern parts of Algeria and Tunisia in the case of V. latastei. Many species can also be found in the Caucasus Mountains, parts of Iraq, Jordan, Israel and Syria. Only one species (V. berus) discovered so far lives in East Asia, most notably North Korea, northern China and northern Mongolia.

== Habitat ==
Most Vipera species prefer cooler environments. Those found at lower latitudes tend to prefer higher altitudes and dryer, rocky habitats, while the species that occur at more northern latitudes prefer lower elevations and environments that have more vegetation and moisture.

== Behavior ==
All species of the genus Vipera are terrestrial.

== Reproduction ==
All Vipera species are viviparous, giving birth to live young.

== Venom ==
Most Vipera species have venom that contains both neurotoxic and haemotoxic components. Bites vary widely in severity.

V. ammodytes is most likely the species with the most toxic venom. In a study solely involving mice, John Haynes Brown (1973) showed that the LD50 is about 1.2/mg/kg through an IV, 1.5 mg/Kg when injected in the peritoneum (IP), and 2.0 mg/kg when administered subcutaneously (SC).

V. berus venom is considered to be on the lower end of the scale when it comes to toxicity. Minton (1974) suggests that the LD50 values for mice are about 0.55 mg/kg IV, 0.80 mg/kg IP, and 6.45 mg SC. Venom yield tends to be lower in this species with Minton citing 10–18 mg per bite in specimens 48–62 cm (19–24 in), while Brown suggest only 6 mg for the same sized specimens.

However, bites from Vipera species are rarely as severe as those from larger Macrovipera or Daboia.

== Fossil record ==
The oldest species of the genus Vipera is the Early Miocene V. antiqua from Southern Germany. The earliest known V. antiqua fossil has been dated to 22.5 million years ago. A very large indeterminate Vipera was found in the Early Pliocene deposits of Mallorca. This species surpassed in size all modern relatives, with a length of nearly 2 m (6 ft 7 in), and was one of the biggest predators of its ecosystem.

== Species ==
Image	Species	Taxon author	Subsp.*	Common name	Geographic range
Atai viper specimen curled in a circle	V. altaica	Tuniyev, Nilson & Andrén, 2010	0		Eastern Kazakhstan
	V. ammodytes	(Linnaeus, 1758)	4	Horned viper	North-eastern Italy, southern Slovakia, western Hungary, Slovenia, Croatia, Bosnia-Herzegovina, Serbia, Montenegro, Albania, North Macedonia, Greece (including Macedonia and Cyclades), Romania, Bulgaria, Turkey, Georgia and Syria.
V. anatolica winding up in a defensive pose	V. anatolica	Eiselt & Baran, 1970	0	Anatolian meadow viper	southwestern Turkey
	V. aspis^{T}	(Linnaeus, 1758)	4	Asp viper	France, Andorra, northeastern Spain, extreme southwestern Germany, Switzerland, Monaco, the islands of Elba and Montecristo, Sicily, Italy, San Marino and northwestern Slovenia.
	V. berus	(Linnaeus, 1758)	3	Common European adder	From western Europe (Great Britain, Scandinavia, France) across central (Italy, Albania, Bulgaria and northern Greece) and eastern Europe to north of the Arctic Circle, and Russia to the Pacific Ocean, Sakhalin Island, North Korea, northern Mongolia and northern China.
	V. darevskii	Vedmederja, Orlov & Tuniyev, 1986	0	Darevsky's viper	The southeastern Dzavachet Mountains in Armenia and adjacent areas in Georgia.
	V. dinniki	Nikolsky, 1913	0	Dinnik's viper	Russia (Great Caucasus) and Georgia (high mountain basin of the Inguri River), eastward to Azerbaijan.
	V. eriwanensis	(Reuss, 1933)	2	Alburzi viper, Armenian steppe viper	Armenia, northwestern Iran, northeastern Turkey
Vipera graeca flicking its tongue	V. graeca	Nilson & Andrén, 1988	0	Greek meadow viper	Albania and Greece
	V. kaznakovi	Nikolsky, 1909	0	Caucasus viper	Northeastern Turkey, Georgia and Russia (eastern Black Sea coast.
	V. latastei	Boscá, 1878	3	Lataste's viper	Extreme southwestern Europe (France, Portugal and Spain) and northwestern Africa (the Mediterranean region of Morocco, Algeria and Tunisia).
	V. lotievi	Nilson, Tuniyev, Orlov, Höggren & Andrén, 1995	0	Caucasian meadow viper	The higher range of the Big Caucasus: Russia, Georgia and Azerbaijan.
Vipera monticola looking to the left	V. monticola	H. Saint-Girons, 1954	0	Atlas mountain viper	High Atlas Mountains, Morocco.
	V. nikolskii	Vedmederja, Grubant & Rudajewa, 1986	0		Ukraine, central and southern Russia, Romania, Moldova
	V. orlovi	Tuniyev & Ostrovskikh, 2001	0	Orlov's viper	Western Caucasus.
	V. renardi	(Christoph, 1861)	5	Steppe viper	Ukraine, Russia, Kazakhstan, Kyrgyzstan, Uzbekistan, Tadzikistan, Mongolia, and China.
	V. sakoi	Tuniyev, Avcı, Ilgaz, Olgun, Petrova, Bodrov, Geniez & Teynié, 2018	0		Turkey
	V. seoanei	Lataste, 1879	1	Baskian viper	Extreme southwestern France and the northern regions of Spain and Portugal.
	V. transcaucasiana	Boulenger, 1913	0	Transcaucasian long-nosed viper	Republic of Georgia, northwestern Azerbaijan, northern Turkey, and Iran.
	V. ursinii	(Bonaparte, 1835)	0	Meadow viper	Southeastern France, eastern Austria (extinct), Hungary, central Italy, Croatia, Bosnia-Herzegovina, northern and northeastern Albania, Romania, northern Bulgaria, Greece, Turkey, northwestern Iran, Armenia, Azerbaijan, Georgia, Russia and across the Kazakhstan, Kirgizia and eastern Uzbekistan steppes to China (Xinjiang).
	V. walser	Ghielmi, Menegon, Marsden, Laddaga & Ursenbacher, 2016	0	Piedmont viper	Northwestern Italy in the Pennine Alps.

* Not including the nominate subspecies. ^{T}: type species

Nota bene: A taxon author in parentheses indicates that the species was originally described in a genus other than Vipera.
