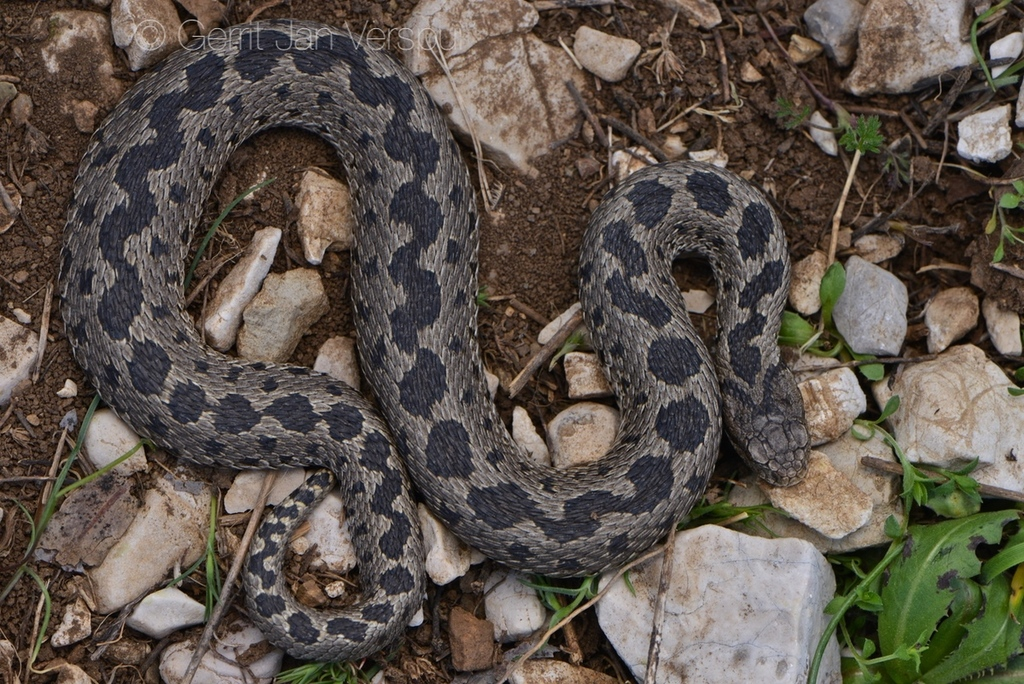

Conservation status
- Critically Endangered (IUCN 3.1)

Scientific classification
- Kingdom: Animalia
- Phylum: Chordata
- Class: Reptilia
- Order: Squamata
- Suborder: Serpentes
- Family: Viperidae
- Genus: Vipera
- Species: V. anatolica

Binomial name
- Vipera anatolica Eiselt & Baran, 1970
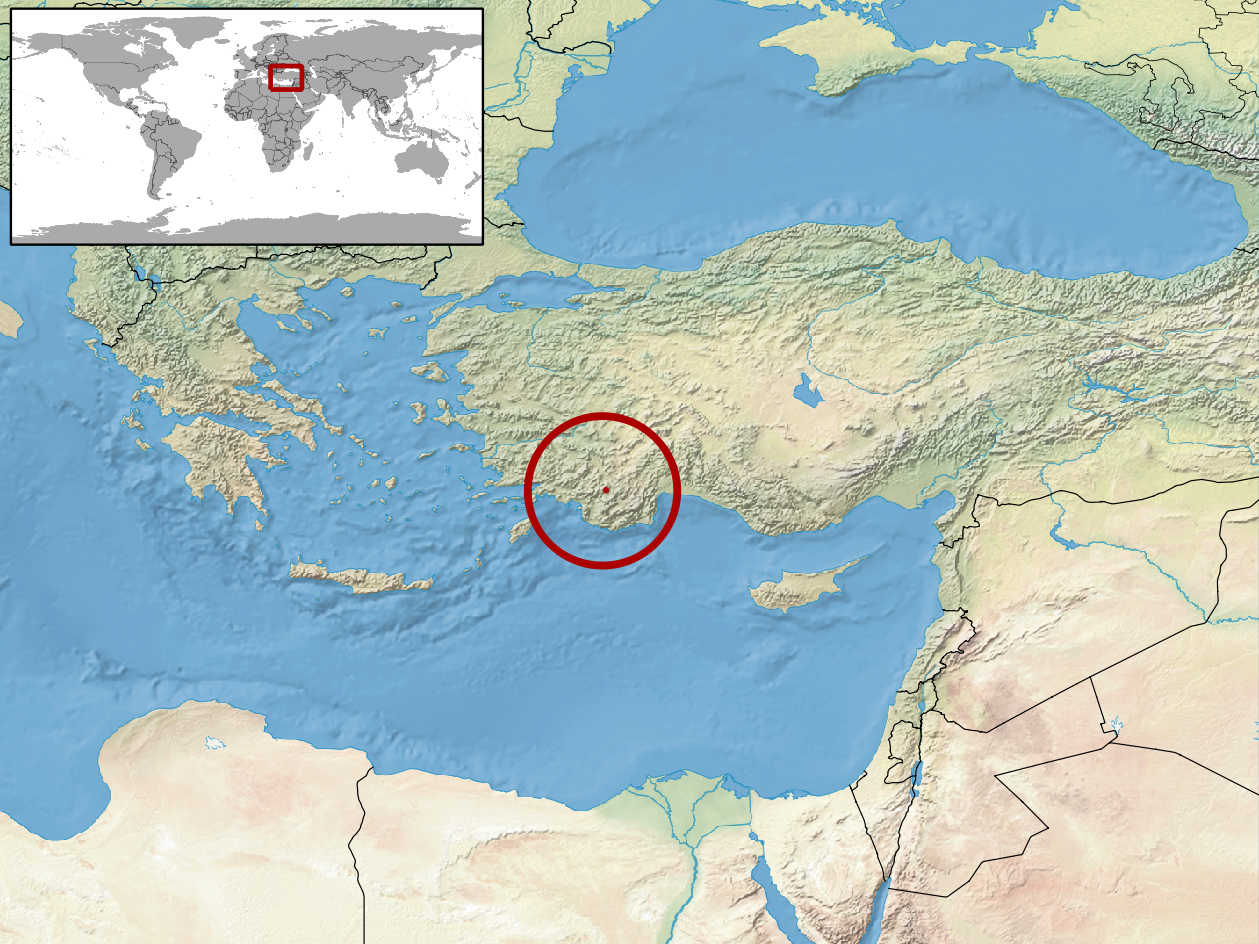

Synonyms
- Vipera ursinii anatolica Eiselt & Baran, 1970

= Vipera anatolica =

Species of snake

Vipera anatolica, commonly known as the Anatolian meadow viper, is a species of venomous snake of the family Viperidae.

== Geographic range ==
The snake is found in southwestern Turkey.
