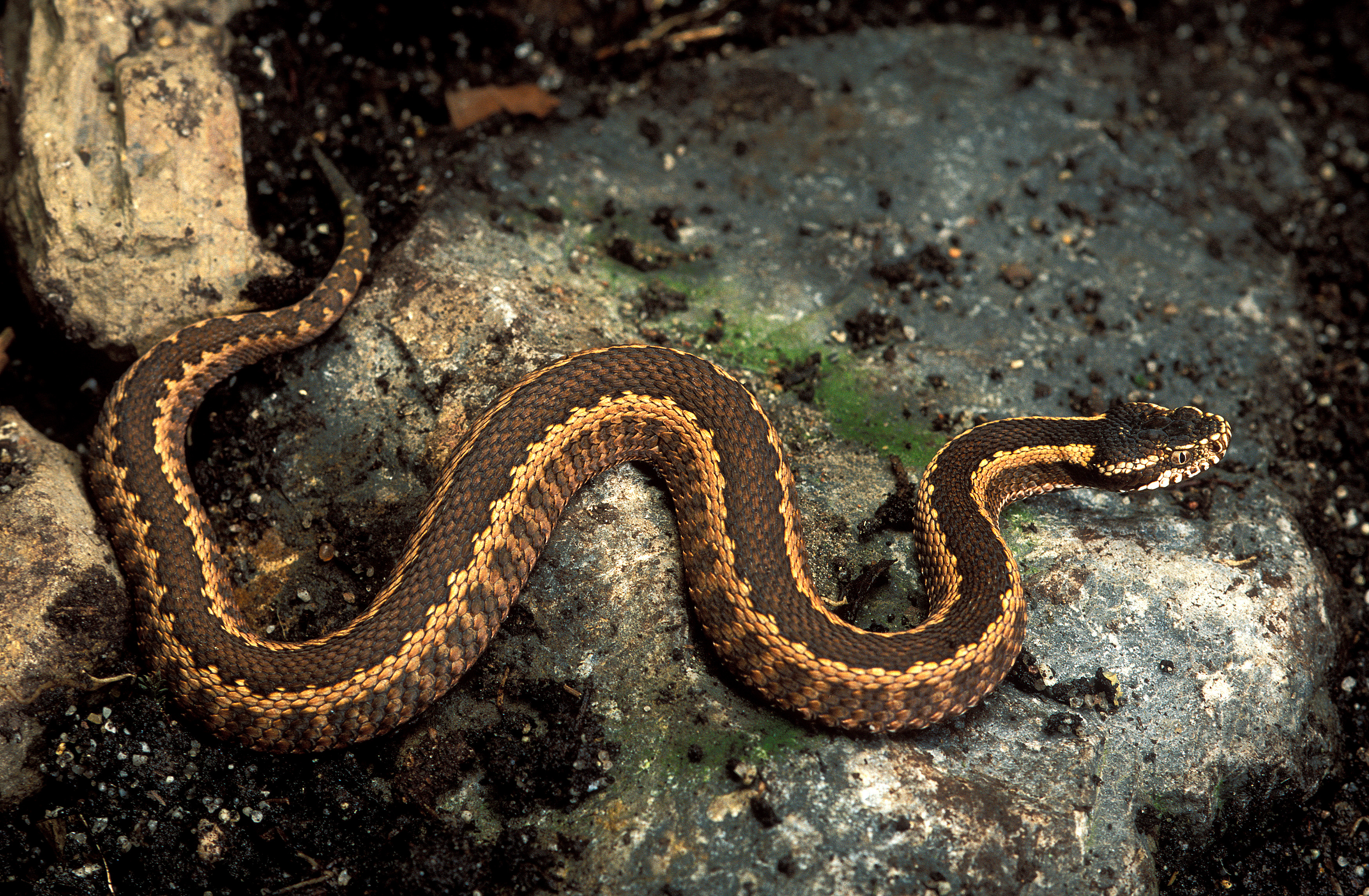

Conservation status
- Vulnerable (IUCN 3.1)

Scientific classification
- Kingdom: Animalia
- Phylum: Chordata
- Class: Reptilia
- Order: Squamata
- Suborder: Serpentes
- Family: Viperidae
- Genus: Vipera
- Species: V. dinniki

Binomial name
- Vipera dinniki Nikolsky, 1913
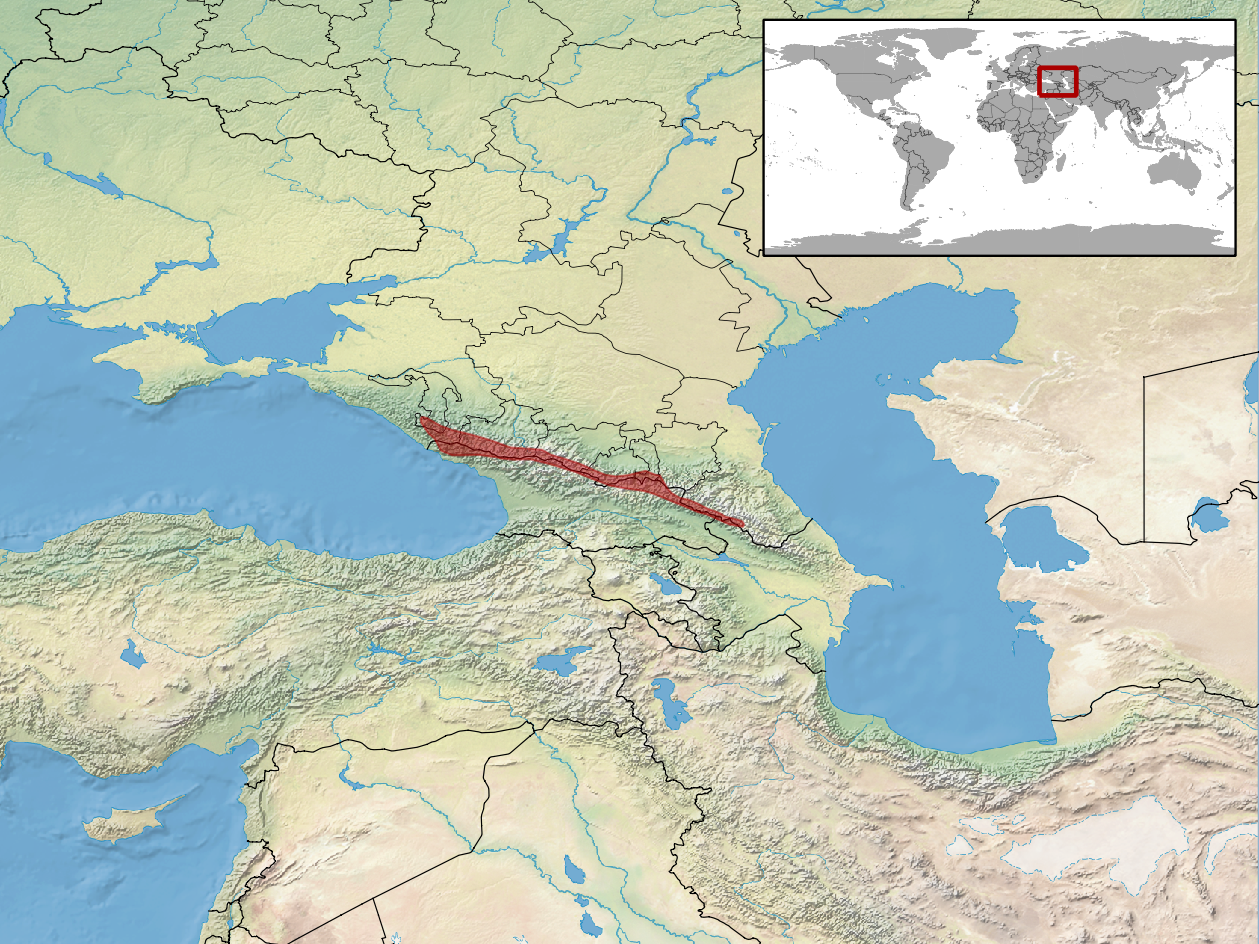

Synonyms
- Vipera berus dinniki Nikolsky, 1913; Coluber berus dinniki — Nikolsky, 1916; Vipera tigrina Zarevskij, 1917; Mesocoronis (Tzarevscya) tigrina — A.F. Reuss, 1929; Vipera kaznakowi dinnicki [sic] Darevskij, 1956; Vipera kaznakowi orientalis Vedmederja, 1984; Vipera dinnicki — Vedmederja, Grubant & Rudajeva, 1986; Vipera dinniki — Orlov & Tuniyev, 1990

= Vipera dinniki =

Species of snake

Common names: Dinnik's viper, Caucasus subalpine viper.

Vipera dinniki is a viper species native to the Caucasus Mountains region, part of Russia, Georgia, and Azerbaijan. Like all other vipers, it is venomous. No subspecies are currently recognized.

== Etymology ==
The specific name, dinniki, is in honor of Russian herpetologist Nikolai Yakovlevich Dinnik.

== Description ==
Of the 49 Russian specimens of V. dinniki examined by Orlov and Tuniyev (1990), 29 were males, and the largest male measured 41.2 cm (16.2 in) in total length (including tail). Of the 20 females, the largest was 48.6 cm (19.1 in) in total length.

== Geographic range ==
Vipera dinniki is found from Russia (Great Caucasus) and Georgia (high mountain basin of the Inguri River), eastward to Azerbaijan.

According to Nikolsky (1916), the type locality is "upper reaches of the Malaya Laba 8000 feet [2438 m] above sea level ... and Svanetia, 7000 feet [2134 m] above sea level." According to Nilson et al. (1995), Vedmederja et al. (1986) restricted the type locality to "Malaya Laba" through lectotype selection. Orlov and Tuniyev (1990) give the lectotype locality as "Upper reaches of the Mala (Small) Laba River, Northern Caucasus".

== Habitat ==
The preferred natural habitats of V. dinniki are forest, shrubland, grassland, and rocky areas, at altitudes of 1,500–2,800 m (4,900–9,200 ft).

== Reproduction ==
V. dinniki is viviparous. Mating occurs in April and May, and young are born in August and September. Litter size is 3–7 newborns.

== Conservation status ==
This species, V. dinikki, is classified as vulnerable according to the IUCN with the following criteria: B1ab(iii,v) (v3.1, 2009). This indicates that the population occupies a severely fragmented area over a range of less than 20,000 km^{2} (7,700 mi^{2}). A continued decline in habitat size or quality and in population is expected.
