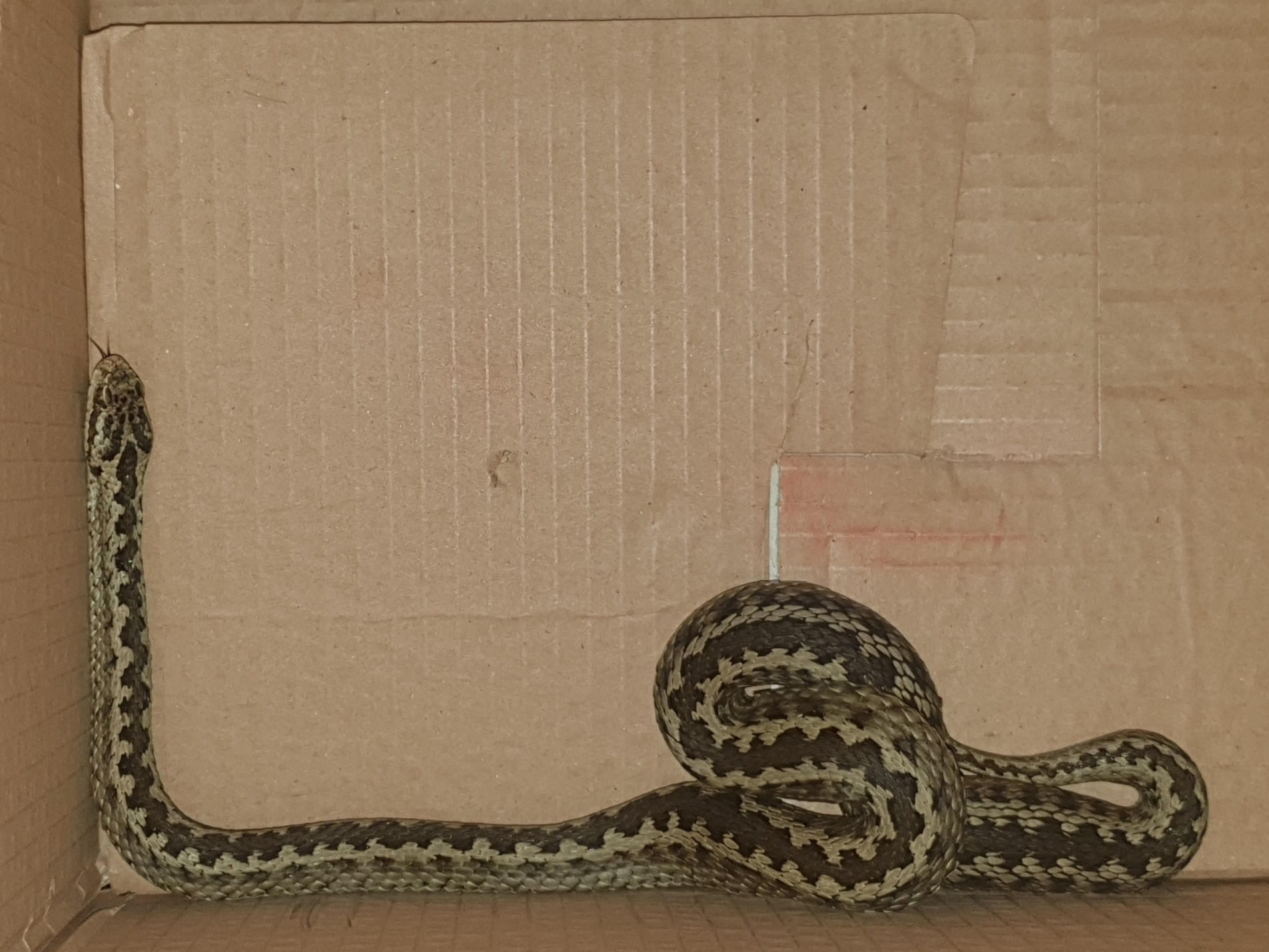

Scientific classification
- Kingdom: Animalia
- Phylum: Chordata
- Class: Reptilia
- Order: Squamata
- Suborder: Serpentes
- Family: Viperidae
- Genus: Vipera
- Species: V. lotievi

Binomial name
- Vipera lotievi Nilson, Tuniyev, Orlov, Höggren & Andrén, 1995
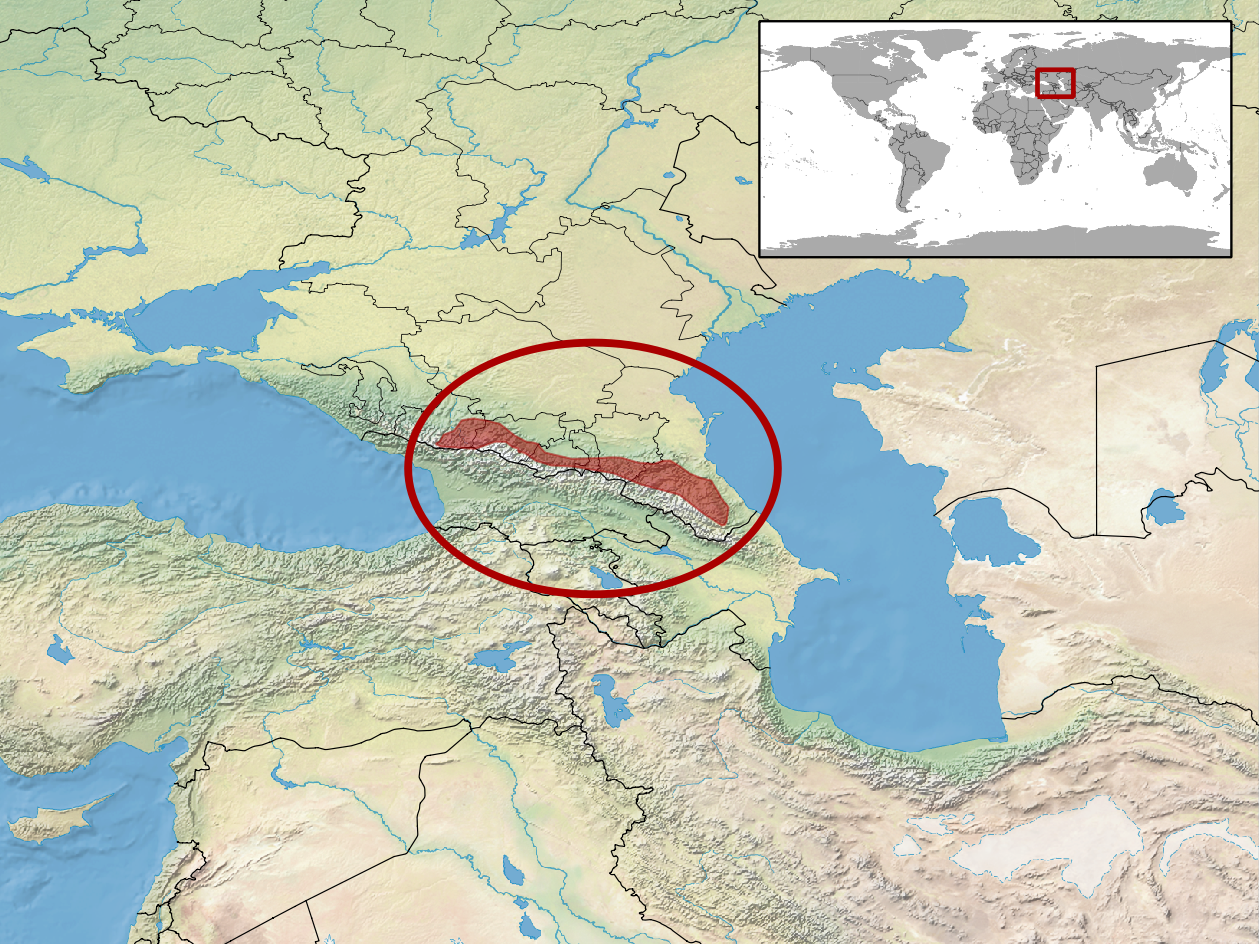

Synonyms
- Vipera lotievi Nilson et al., 1995; Vipera (Pelias) lotievi — Nilson et al., 1999; Vipera lotievi — McDiarmid, Campbell & Touré, 1999; Vipera renardi lotievi — Dely & Joger, 2005; Pelias lotievi — Wallach et al., 2014

= Vipera lotievi =

Species of snake

Vipera lotievi, commonly known as the Caucasian meadow viper and Lotiev's viper, is a species of venomous snake in the family Viperidae. The species is native to Azerbaijan, Georgia, and Russia. There are no subspecies that are recognized as being valid.

== Etymology ==
The specific name, lotievi, is in honor of Russian herpetologist K. Yu Lotiev, who collected the holotype and some of the paratypes.

== Description ==
V. lotievi may grow to a maximum total length (tail included) of 60 cm (24 in).

== Reproduction ==
V. lotievi is viviparous.

== Range ==
V. lotievi is found in the higher range of the Big Caucasus mountain range in Russia, Georgia, and Azerbaijan.

The type locality is listed as "Armkhi, Checheno-Ingushetia, Russia, below Mt. Stolovaya, 2000 m altitude" [Armkhi, Respublika Ingushetiya, Russia, 6,600 ft].
