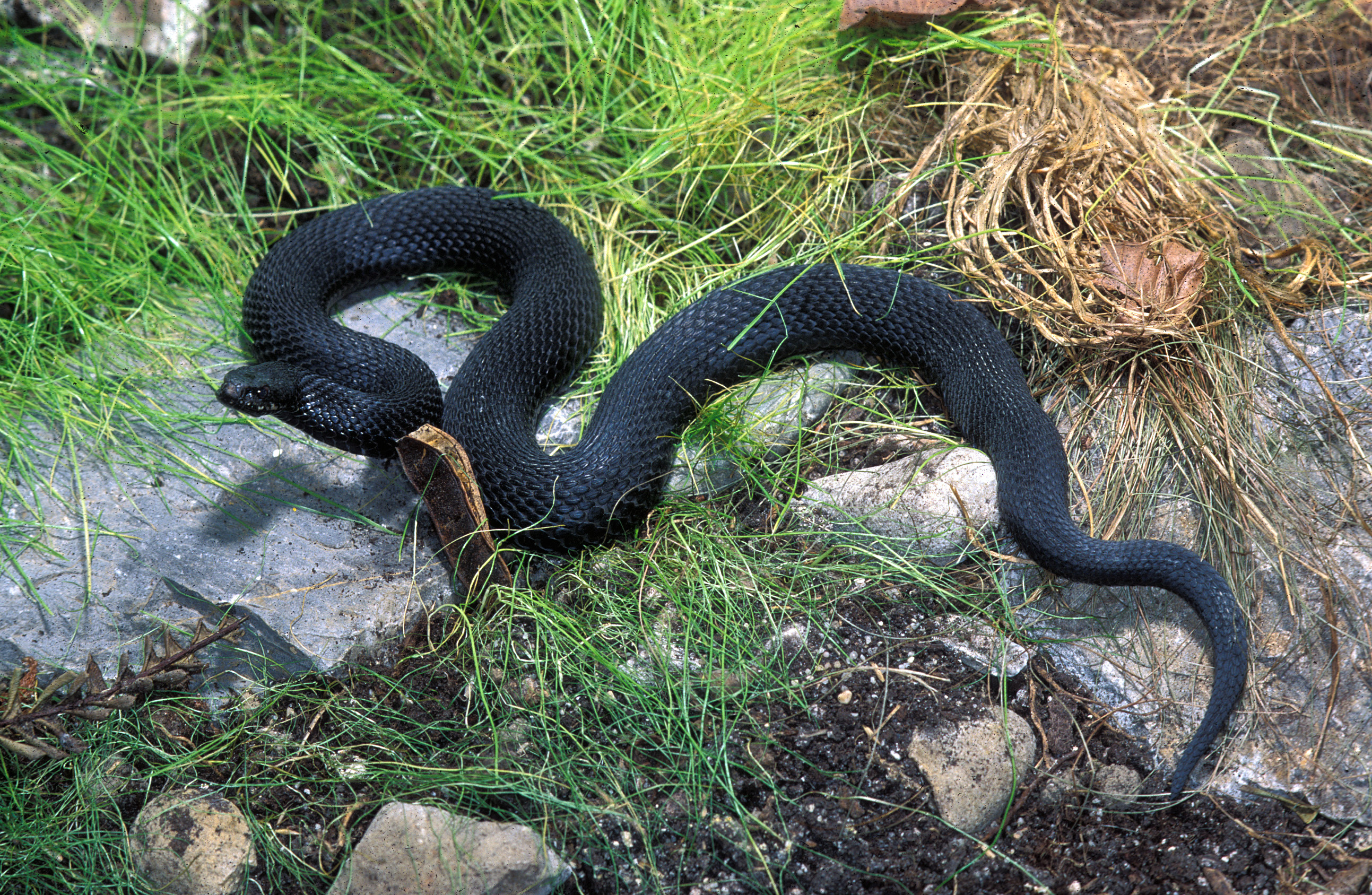

Scientific classification
- Kingdom: Animalia
- Phylum: Chordata
- Class: Reptilia
- Order: Squamata
- Suborder: Serpentes
- Family: Viperidae
- Genus: Vipera
- Species: V. nikolskii

Binomial name
- Vipera nikolskii Vedmederja, Grubant & Rudajewa, 1986

Synonyms
- Vipera berus nikolskii Vedmederja, Grubant & Rudajewa, 1986; Pelias nikolski (Vedmederja, Grubant & Rudajewa, 1986)

= Vipera nikolskii =

Species of snake

Common names: Nikolsky's adder, forest-steppe adder.

Vipera nikolskii is a species of venomous snake in the subfamily Viperinae of the family Viperidae. The species is native to Ukraine, eastern Romania, and southwestern Russia. No subspecies are recognized as being valid.

== Etymology ==
The specific name, nikolskii, is in honor of Russian herpetologist Alexander Mikhailovich Nikolsky.

== Description ==
Adults of Vipera nikolskii are short and thick-bodied, growing to a maximum total length (including tail) of 680 mm (27 in).

Holotype: ZDKU 14704, according to Golay et al. (1993).

== Geographic distribution ==
Vipera nikolskii is spread in Central Ukraine and southwestern Russia. Mallow et al. (2003) mention that the distribution is concentrated in the forest-steppe zone of the Kharkiv region in Ukraine.

The type locality, according to Golay et al. (1993), is the banks of the Uda River, between Besljudovka and Vasishtshevo, near Kharkiv.

Also, V. nikolskii was recently found in the eastern and southern part of Romania and Basarabia (Republic of Moldova) by Zinenko et al. (2010) and Strugariu et al. (2008). It recently occurred on a ridge in the Low Tatras, Slovakia.
