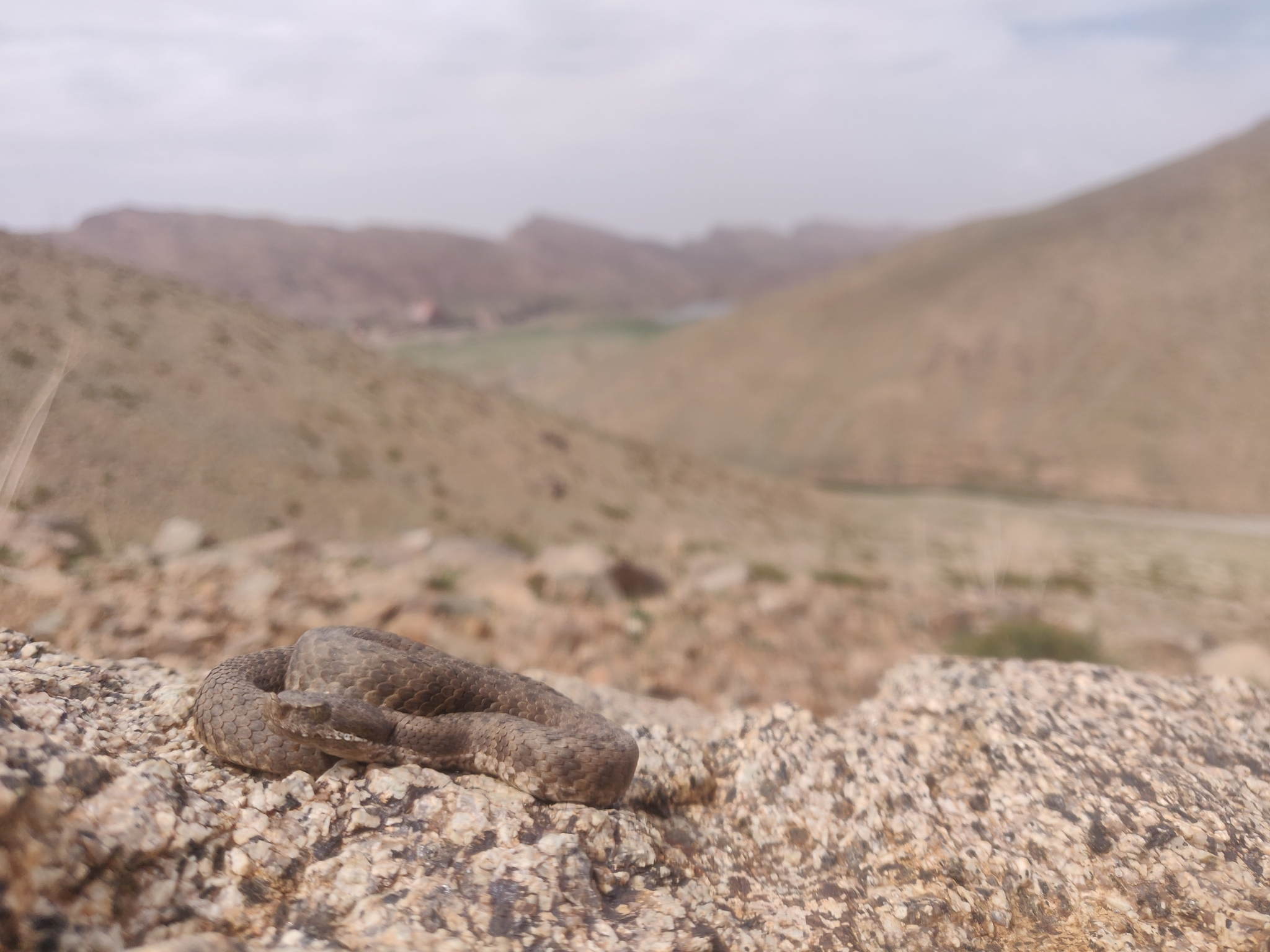

Conservation status
- Near Threatened (IUCN 3.1)

Scientific classification
- Domain: Eukaryota
- Kingdom: Animalia
- Phylum: Chordata
- Class: Reptilia
- Order: Squamata
- Suborder: Serpentes
- Family: Viperidae
- Genus: Vipera
- Species: V. monticola

Binomial name
- Vipera monticola Saint-Girons, 1954
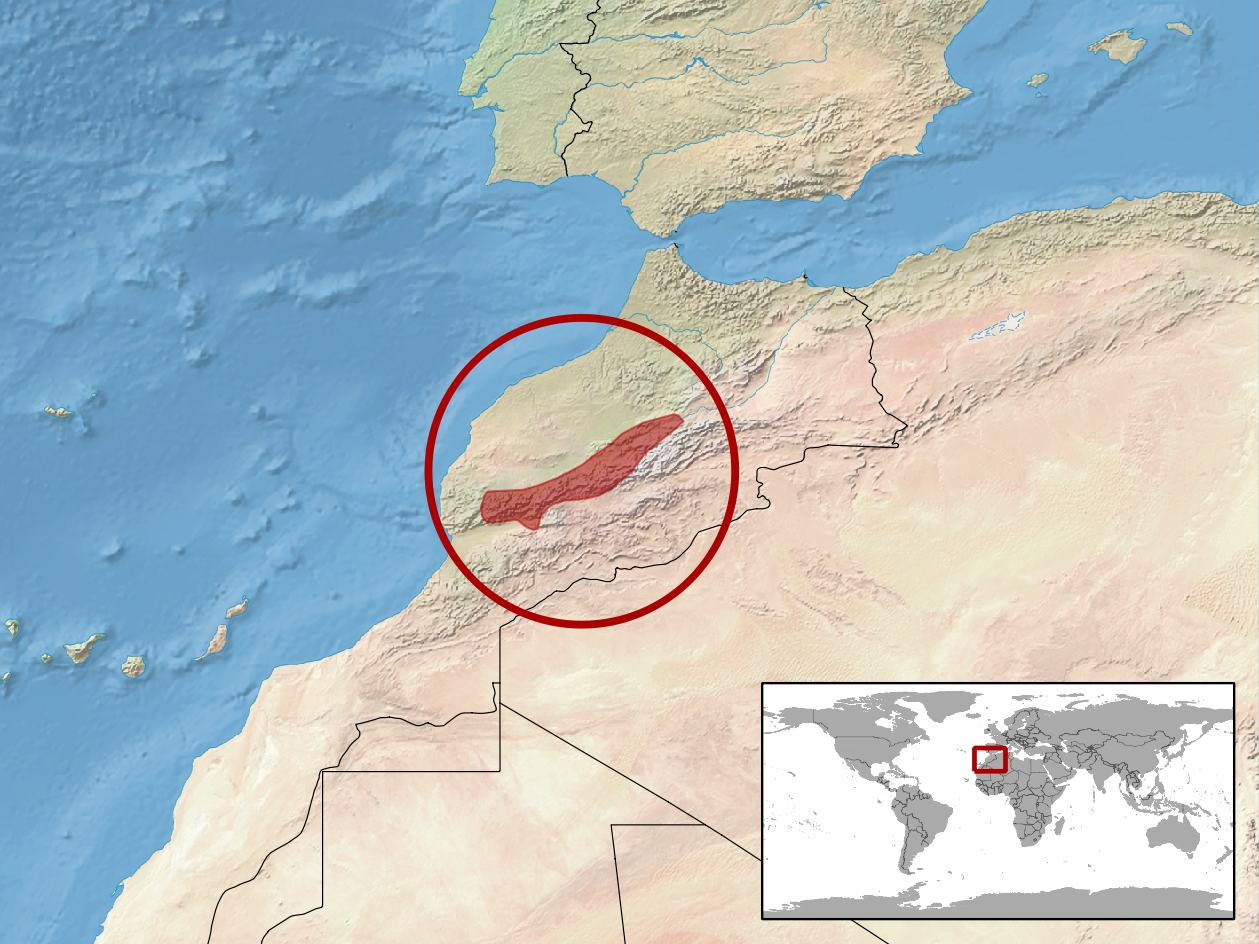

Synonyms
- Vipera latastei montana Saint-Girons, 1953; Vipera latastei monticola Saint-Girons, 1954 (nomen novum); Vipera latasti monticola — Klemmer, 1963; Vipera monticola — Beerli, Billing & Schätti, 1986

= Vipera monticola =

Species of snake

Vipera monticola, also known as the Atlas mountain viper, is a viper species endemic to Morocco. Like all other vipers, it is venomous.

== Description ==
The Atlas mountain viper (Vipera monticola) is a very small species with a maximum total length (body + tail) of less than 40 cm (16 in). Spawls and Branch (1995) describe it as the smallest member of the genus Vipera, reaching a total length of only 345 mm (13.6 in).

== Geographic range ==
It is found in the High Atlas Mountains, Morocco.

The type locality given is "Haut-Atlas, Massif du Toubkal, Maroc...qu'entre 2.500 et 3.900 m " [Toubkal Massif, High Atlas Mountains, southwestern Morocco, between 8,200 and 12,800 ft].

== Conservation status ==
This species is classified as Near Threatened (NT) according to the IUCN Red List of Threatened Species (v3.1, 2001). Listed as such because its extent of occurrence is likely not much more than 20,000 km^{2}, and the extent and quality of its habitat are probably declining, therefore making the species close to qualifying for Vulnerable. Year assessed: 2005.
