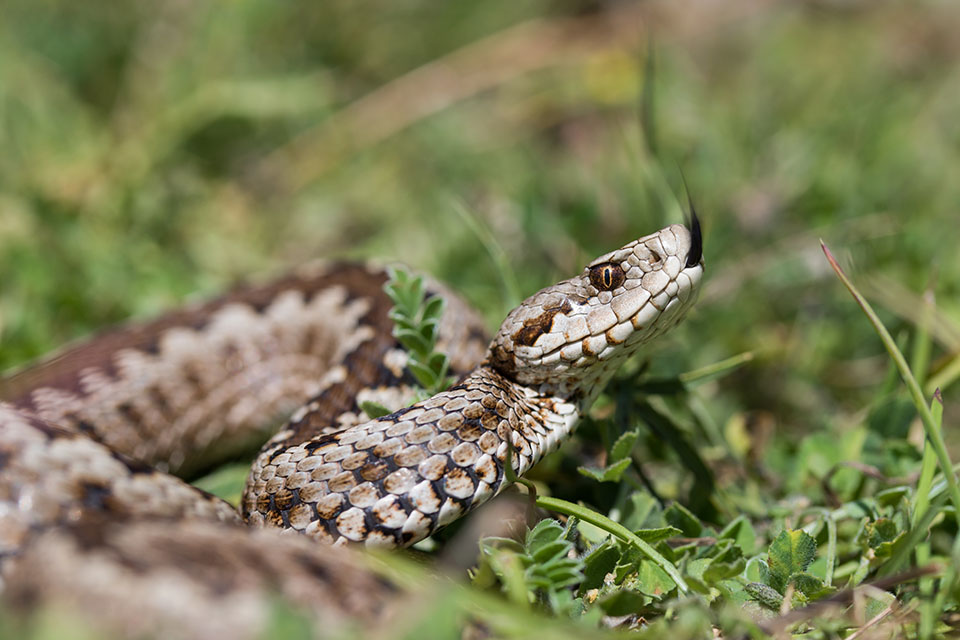

Conservation status
- Endangered (IUCN 3.1)

Scientific classification
- Kingdom: Animalia
- Phylum: Chordata
- Class: Reptilia
- Order: Squamata
- Suborder: Serpentes
- Family: Viperidae
- Genus: Vipera
- Species: V. graeca

Binomial name
- Vipera graeca Nilson & Andrén, 1988

= Vipera graeca =

Species of snakes

Vipera graeca, commonly known as the Greek meadow viper, is a species of viper found in Albania and Greece, named after its presence in Greek meadows. As with all vipers, the Greek viper is venomous. The Greek viper was previously thought to be a subspecies of Vipera ursinii, but was elevated to species status as it has many morphological and molecular differences.

== Description ==
Vipera graeca have a relatively small body size, with around a 40–44 cm maximum snout-vent length depending on sex, with females being larger, and around a 4–5 cm maximum tail length, with males' tails being longer, which is smaller than the reported maximum of V. ursinii. V. graeca also vary from V. ursinii in number and morphology of scales as well as colouring. Though some pattern similarity between Greek and meadow vipers can be faintly seen in some male and juvenile Greek vipers they are different, with no dark spots on their labial, lateral and dorsal sides of the head, with the exception of occipital and post orbital stripes. They also display a white/brownish-grey ventral colour, and sharp zigzag pattern.

Vipera graeca also varies from V. ursinii by scales. The nasal scale is divided into two plates, alternatively it is united with nasorostralia. The rostral scale is as high as it is broad. Greek Vipers have 2–8 loreals, 13–20 circumoculars, 7–20 crown scales, 6–8 supralabials on each side, 7–10 sublabials on each side; 3–5 mental scales, 120–129 ventrals in males and 119–133 in females, and the lowest number of subcaudals in their whole complex: 21–29 subcaudals in males, 13–26 subcaudals in females. Their upper preocular is not separated from their nasal scales. They have more fragmented parietals. Their first three supralabials are two times larger than the others. Their third supralabial is below orbit. They display early dorsal scale row reduction

== Distribution ==
The Greek meadow viper is named after its habitat of Greek mountain meadows. It is most common at high elevations, 1,600–2,300 m (5,200–7,500 ft), of the Hellenides mountain range as well as the center of the Pindos mountain range, where the limestone ground is grassy and populated with shrubs (near which most observed Greek vipers have been found). In these areas, annual temperatures reach an average of about 6 °C (43 °F) with snow laying until summer.

== Diet ==
The diet of the Greek meadow viper generally consists of insects, (specifically Orthoptera). Wing-buzzing grasshoppers, bush crickets, and wart-biters appear to be the most frequent prey.

== Predation ==
The red fox, common kestrel and short-toed snake eagle are the only known predators of V. graeca.

== Taxonomic history ==
Vipera graeca was first described in 1988 by Nilson and Andrén as V. ursinii graeca, as they believed it was a subspecies of V. ursinii.

In 2012, after molecular analysis of its DNA, it was posited for the first time that V. graeca was its own individual species.

In 2020 V. graeca was officially recognised as a distinct Vipera species in the Species list of the European herpetofauna.

== Reproduction ==
Vipera graeca is ovoviviparous.
