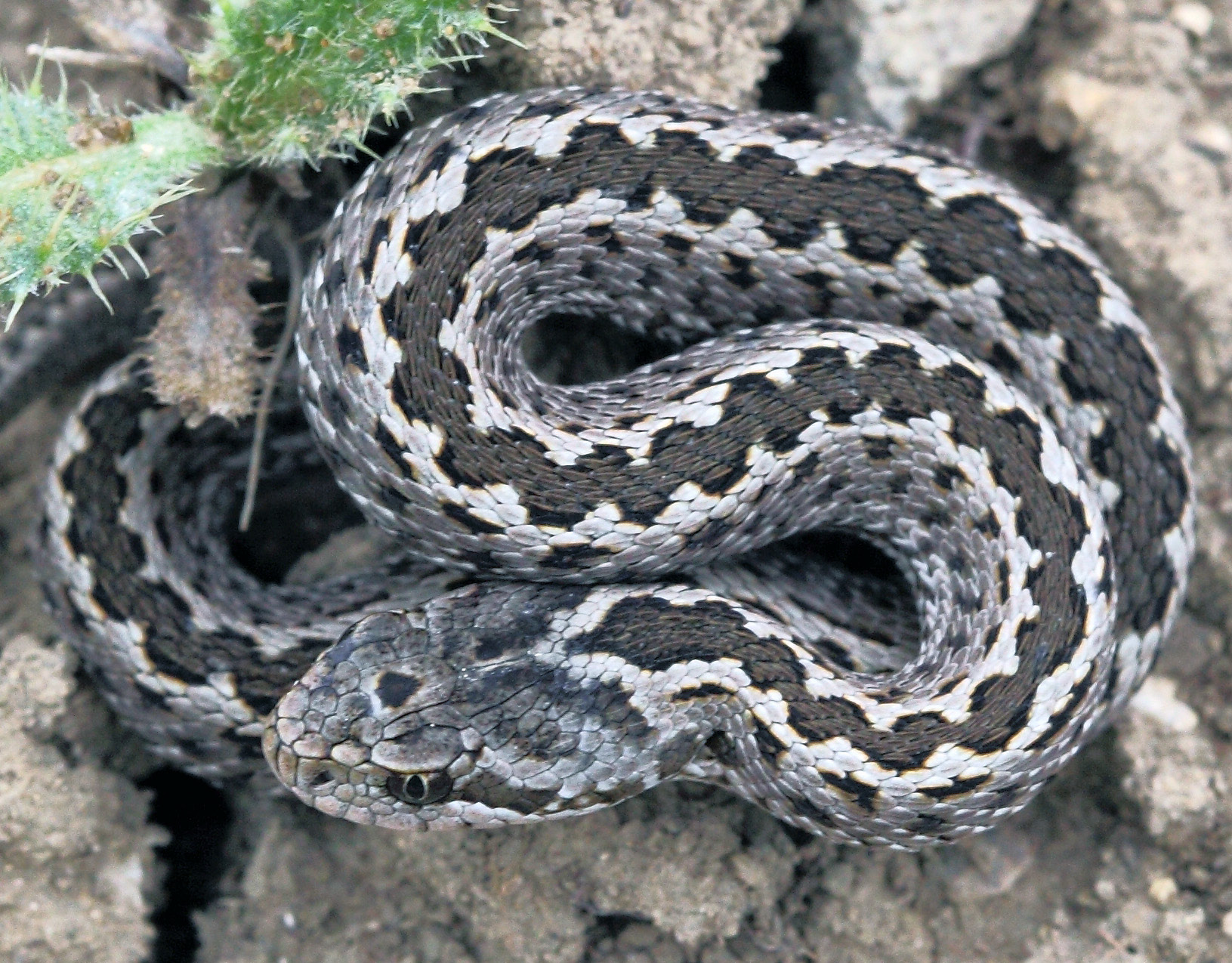

Conservation status
- Vulnerable (IUCN 3.1)

Scientific classification
- Kingdom: Animalia
- Phylum: Chordata
- Class: Reptilia
- Order: Squamata
- Suborder: Serpentes
- Family: Viperidae
- Genus: Vipera
- Species: V. eriwanensis

Binomial name
- Vipera eriwanensis (Reuss, 1933)
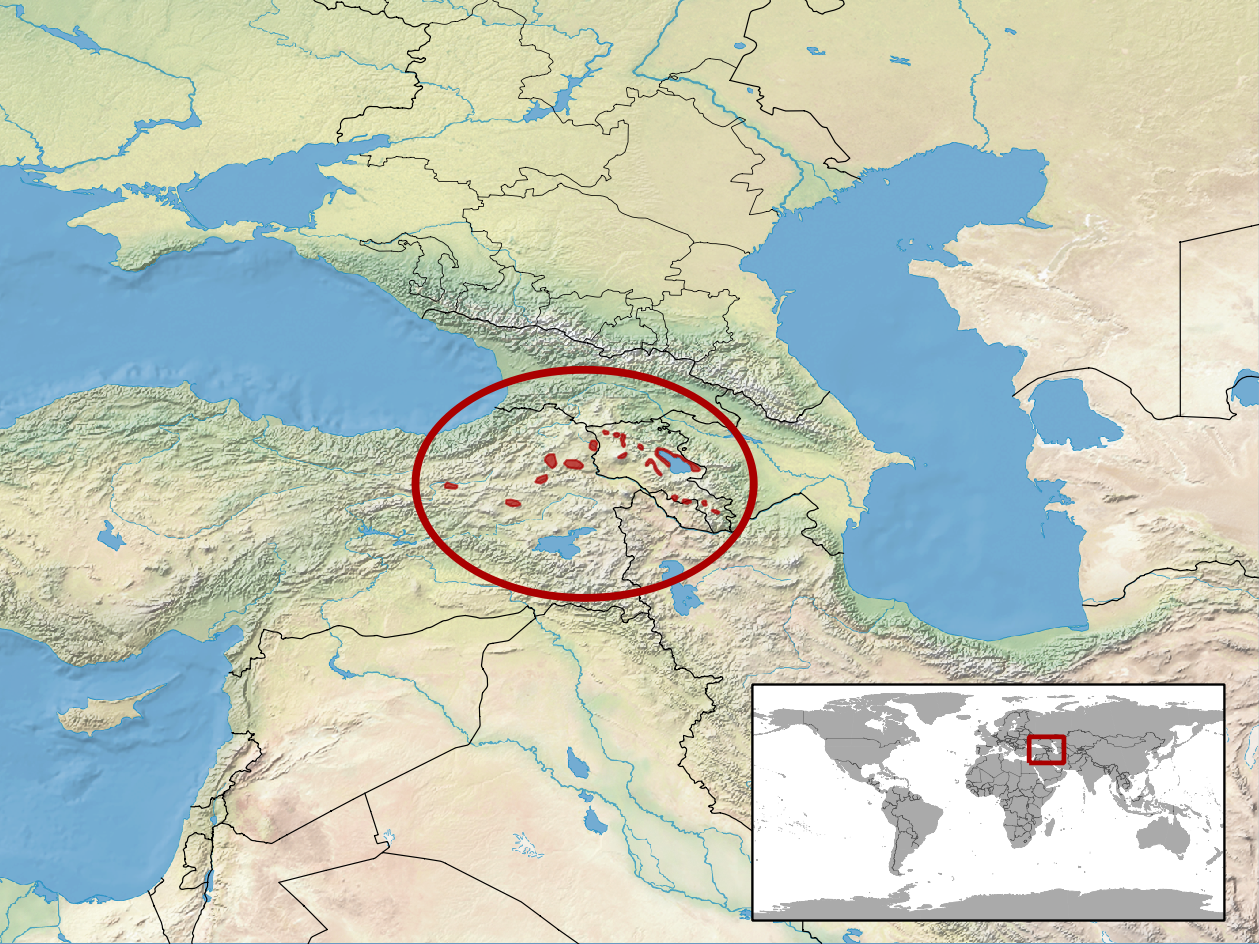
- Geographic distribution

Synonyms
- Acridophaga renardi eriwanensis Reuss, 1933; Vipera ursinii ebneri Knoepffler & Sochurek, 1955; Vipera ursinii eriwanensis — Joger, 1984; Vipera eriwanensis — Höggren et al., 1993; Vipera eriwanensis ebneri — Golay et al., 1993; Vipera renardi eriwanensis — Welch, 1994; Vipera (Pelias) eriwanensis — Nilson et al., 1999

= Vipera eriwanensis =

Species of snake

Vipera eriwanensis, commonly known as the Alburzi viper or the Armenian steppe viper, is a species of venomous snake in the family Viperidae. The species is native to western Asia. There are two recognized subspecies.

== Subspecies ==
There are two subspecies which are recognized as being valid.

- Vipera eriwanensis ebneri Knoepffler & Sochurek, 1955
- Vipera eriwanensis eriwanensis (Reuss, 1933)

== Geographic range ==
V. eriwanensis is found in Armenia, northwestern Iran, and northeastern Turkey.

== Habitat ==
The preferred natural habitat of V. eriwanensis is rocky areas of grassland, at altitudes of 1,000–3,000 m (3,300–9,800 ft).

== Reproduction ==
V. eriwanensis is ovoviviparous. Litter size may be as large as ten.

== Etymology ==
The subspecific name, ebneri, is in honor of Austrian entomologist Richard Ebner.
