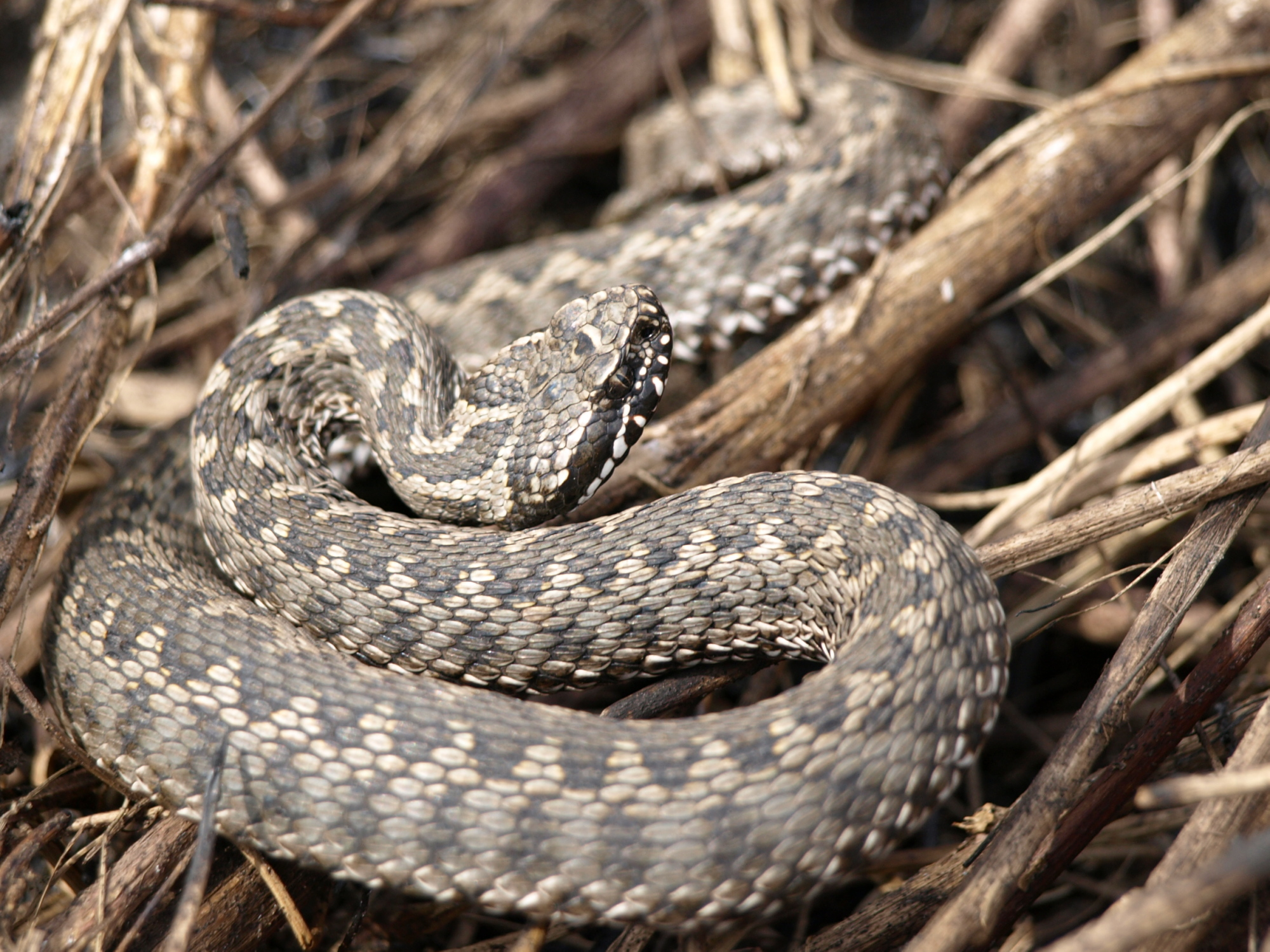

Conservation status
- Vulnerable (IUCN 3.1)

Scientific classification
- Kingdom: Animalia
- Phylum: Chordata
- Class: Reptilia
- Order: Squamata
- Suborder: Serpentes
- Family: Viperidae
- Genus: Vipera
- Species: V. renardi

Binomial name
- Vipera renardi (Christoph, 1861)

Synonyms
- Pelias renardi Christoph, 1861; Vipera renardi — Boulenger, 1893; Vipera ursinii renardi — Harding & Welch, 1980; Vipera renardi — Welch, 1994

= Vipera renardi =

Species of snake

Vipera renardi is a species of viper, a venomous snake in the family Viperidae. The species is endemic to Asia and Eastern Europe. Five subspecies are recognized.

== Etymology ==
The specific name, renardi, is in honor of Russian naturalist Charles Renard (1809—1886), also known as Karl Renard.

The subspecific names, bashkirovi and puzanovi, are in honor of Russian zoologists Ivan Sergeyevich Bashkirov (1900–1980) and Ivan Ivanovich Puzanov (1885–1971), respectively.

== Geographic range ==
V. renardi is found in China, Kazakhstan, Kyrgyzstan, Mongolia, Georgia (country), Russia, Tajikistan, Ukraine, and Uzbekistan.

== Habitat ==
The natural habitats of V. renardi are shrubland, grassland, and rocky areas, at altitudes of 0–2,500 m (0–8,202 ft).

== Reproduction ==
V. renardi is ovoviviparous.

== Subspecies ==
Five subspecies are recognized as being valid, including the nominotypical subspecies.

- Vipera renardi bashkirovi Garanin, Pavlov & Bakiev, 2004
- Vipera renardi parursinii Nilson & Andrén, 2001
- Vipera renardi puzanovi Kukuskin, 2009
- Vipera renardi renardi (Christoph, 1861)
- Vipera renardi tienshanica Nilson & Andrén, 2001

Nota bene: A trinomial authority in parentheses indicates that the subspecies was originally described in a genus other than Vipera.
