= Alexander Nikolsky =

Russian and Ukrainian zoologist (1857–1942)

- Александр Никольский
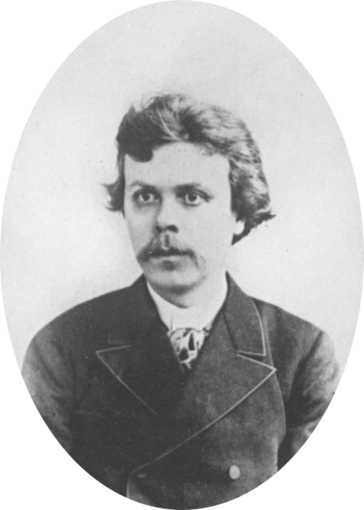
- Nikolsky, c. 1910
- Born: 18 February 1858; Astrakhan, Russia
- Died: 8 December 1942 (aged 84); Kharkov, Ukrainian SSR, Soviet Union
- Education: University of St. Petersburg (doctorate, 1887)
- Known for: Taxonomic authority of 26 reptile species
- Scientific career
- Fields: Herpetology
- Workplaces: Zoological Museum of the Academy of Sciences; Kharkov University
- Author abbrev. (zoology): Nikolskii

Alexander Mikhailovich Nikolsky (Russian: Александр Михайлович Никольский, romanized: Aleksandr Mikhaylovich Nikolsky; 18 February 1858 – 8 December 1942) was a Russian and Ukrainian zoologist born in Astrakhan.

== Career ==
From 1877 to 1881, he studied at the University of St. Petersburg, earning his doctorate several years later in 1887. From 1881 to 1891, he took part in numerous expeditions to Siberia, the Caucasus, Persia, Japan, et al. In 1887 he became an associate professor in St. Petersburg, later becoming director of the herpetology department at the Zoological Museum of the Academy of Sciences (1895).

In 1903 he relocated as a professor to the Kharkov University. In 1919, he was elected a member of the Academy of Sciences of Ukraine. Among his written works were Herpetologia Caucasica (1913), and volumes on reptiles and amphibians that were part of the series "Fauna of Russia and Adjacent Countries".

He is the taxonomic authority of 26 reptile species. The viper Vipera nikolskii (Nikolsky's adder) and the turtle subspecies Testudo graeca nikolskii (Nikolsky's tortoise) are named in his honor. Today in Russia, the "Nikolsky Herpetological Society" commemorates his name.

== Notes ==
- This article is based on a translation of an article from the French Wikipedia, whose sources are listed as:
  - Adler, Kraig (1989). Contributions to the History of Herpetology. Society for the Study of Amphibians and Reptiles (SSAR). 202 pp. ISBN 0-916984-19-2.
  - Lescure, Jean; Le Garff, Bernard (2006). L'étymologie des noms d'amphibiens et de reptiles. Paris: Éditions Belin. 207 pp. ISBN 2-7011-4142-7. (in French).

== Sources ==
- "Никольский, Александр Михайлович" . Brockhaus and Efron Encyclopedic Dictionary (in Russian). 1906.
