= Albert Franz Theodor Reuss =

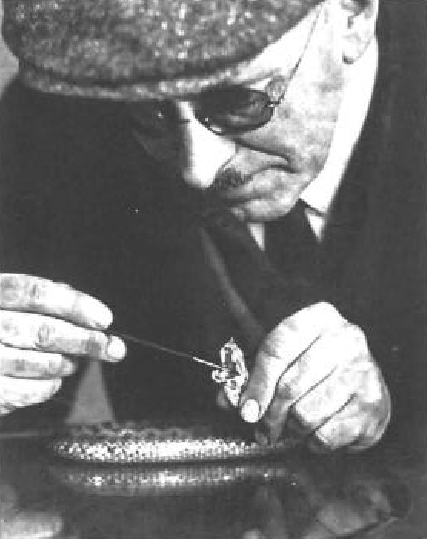
Reuss handling a venomous snake from the cover of Die Weite Welt (29 April 1928)

Albert Franz Theodor Reuss (23 May 1879 – 24 December 1958) was a self taught German amateur herpetologist and terrarium keeper. He also took an interest in entomology.

Reuss was born in Munich to occultist Albert Karl Theodor Reuss and Delphina Garbois. Reuss grew up in Berlin and made a living selling butterflies and snake venom, and keeping terraria and aquaria. He was also a painter. His first work on entomology was published in 1919, and in 1923 he published on adders. He sold butterfly specimens to museums and was active among amateur groups. He kept a number of venomous snakes including Russell's vipers and black mambas, and he was bitten several times. There were also accidents in which others got bitten by his snakes, which resulted in at least one arrest and three months spent in prison. One associate claimed that Reuss committed suicide after his apartment with snakes was destroyed by bombs during World War II. However, this was not true as he rebuilt his collections and did not die until 1958.
