= Kenyan carpet viper =

Kenyan carpet viper is a common name that may refer to either or both of the following subspecies, both of which are found in Kenya:

- Echis pyramidum aliaborri Drews & Sacherer, 1974
- Echis pyramidum leakeyi Stemmler & Sochurek, 1969
