= Vipera echis =

Vipera echis is a taxonomic synonym that may refer to:

- Echis carinatus, a.k.a. the Indian saw-scaled viper, a venomous viper species found in parts of the Middle East and Central Asia, and especially the Indian subcontinent
- Echis pyramidum, a.k.a. the Northeast African saw-scaled viper, a venomous vipers species found mainly in north-east Africa, but also in parts of the Arabian Peninsula
