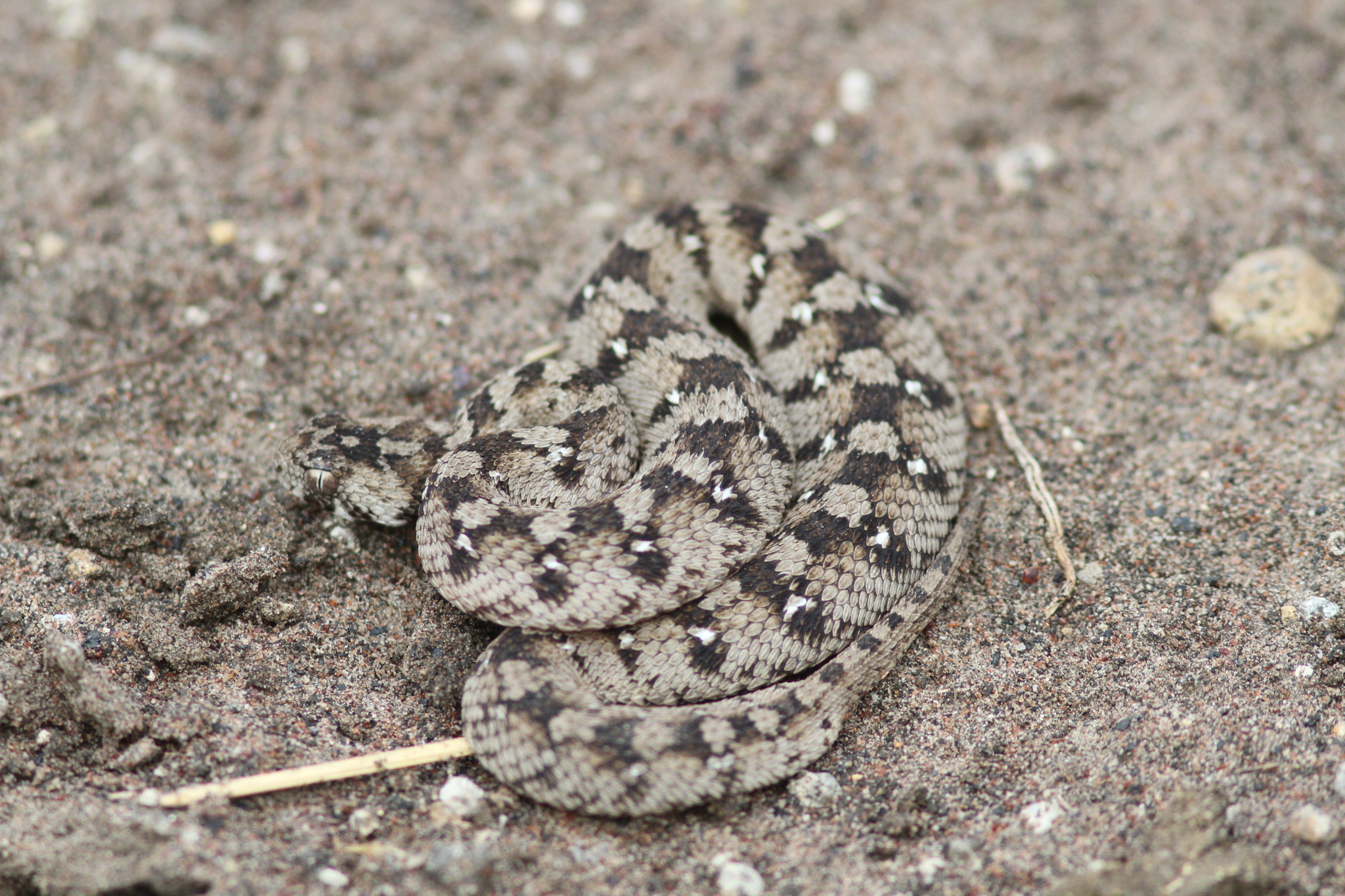

Conservation status
- Least Concern (IUCN 3.1)

Scientific classification
- Kingdom: Animalia
- Phylum: Chordata
- Class: Reptilia
- Order: Squamata
- Suborder: Serpentes
- Family: Viperidae
- Genus: Echis
- Species: E. ocellatus

Binomial name
- Echis ocellatus Stemmler, 1970

Synonyms
- Echis carinatus ocellatus Stemmler, 1970; Echis ocellatus — Hughes, 1976; Echis [(Toxicoa)] ocellatus — Cherlin, 1990

= Echis ocellatus =

Species of snake

Echis ocellatus, known by the common names West African carpet viper and ocellated carpet viper, is a highly venomous species of viper endemic to West Africa. No subspecies are currently recognized.

It is responsible for more human fatalities due to snakebite than all other African species combined. An antivenom called Echitab-plus-ICP is manufactured by the Costa Rican Instituto Clodomiro Picado and another called EchiTabG is manufactured by MicroPharm Ltd in the UK.

== Taxonomy ==
Othmar Stemmler described the species in 1970. It was considered a subspecies of the E. carinatus.

Recent revisions split the species into three, with the recognition of Echis jogeri from Senegal, Guinea and Mali, and Echis romani from eastern Nigeria, southeastern Niger, Cameroon and Chad.

The specific name, ocellatus, is a reference to the distinctive series of "eye-spots" (ocelli) which runs the length of the body.

Common names include African saw-tailed viper, ocellated carpet viper and West African carpet viper.

== Description and behavior ==
The maximum total length (body + tail) is 65 cm (26 in), possibly more, while the average total length is 30–50 cm (12–20 in). They are characterized by their bulging eyes and short snout, typical of species of the genus Echis. E. ocellatus is terrestrial, nocturnal and crepuscular: it usually goes out to hunt its prey at the first hours of the night, prey like small vertebrates, like mammals, birds, lizards and amphibians, it has already been reported to hunt small invertebrates like centipedes and scorpions. It's a very aggressive viper; it forms its body like a ''S'' and rubs itself making an alert sound with its scales.

== Range and habitat ==
It is found in West Africa in Mali, Ivory Coast, Burkina Faso, Ghana, Togo, Benin, southern Niger, and Nigeria. Older records from Senegal, Guinea Bissau and Guinea refer to Echis jogeri, and those from eastern Nigeria, Cameroon and southern Chad to Echis romani.

The type locality is described as "Haute Volta, Garango, 048 N, 033 W" (Burkina Faso).

There are also reports of single specimens found in the Bangui in the Central African Republic and in central Sudan. It is rarely found north of the 15^{th} parallel, after which E. leucogaster becomes more common. The geographic range of E. ocellatus extends to the coast via the Dahomey Gap. They are mainly found in savanna and occasionally in wooded areas.

== Reproduction ==
Sexually mature females lay between 6 and 20 eggs, usually at the end of the dry season in February to March. Hatchlings are 10–12 cm (3.9–4.7 in) in total length.

== Venom ==
The venom of the West African carpet viper is responsible for more fatalities than all other African snakes combined. Its venom is a compound of procoagulants, anticoagulants, hemorraghins, nephrotoxins and necrotoxins, and bite symptoms include local pain, swelling, bleeding necrosis and disfigurement which may result in amputation. Systemic symptoms include coagulopathy, hemorrhages, shock, renal failure and blindness. The envenoming rate is 80% and the lethality rate is 10-20%.
