= Echis megalocephalus =

Scientific classification
- Kingdom: Animalia
- Phylum: Chordata
- Class: Reptilia
- Order: Squamata
- Suborder: Serpentes
- Family: Viperidae
- Genus: Echis
- Species: E. megalocephalus

Binomial name
- Echis megalocephalus Cherlin, 1990
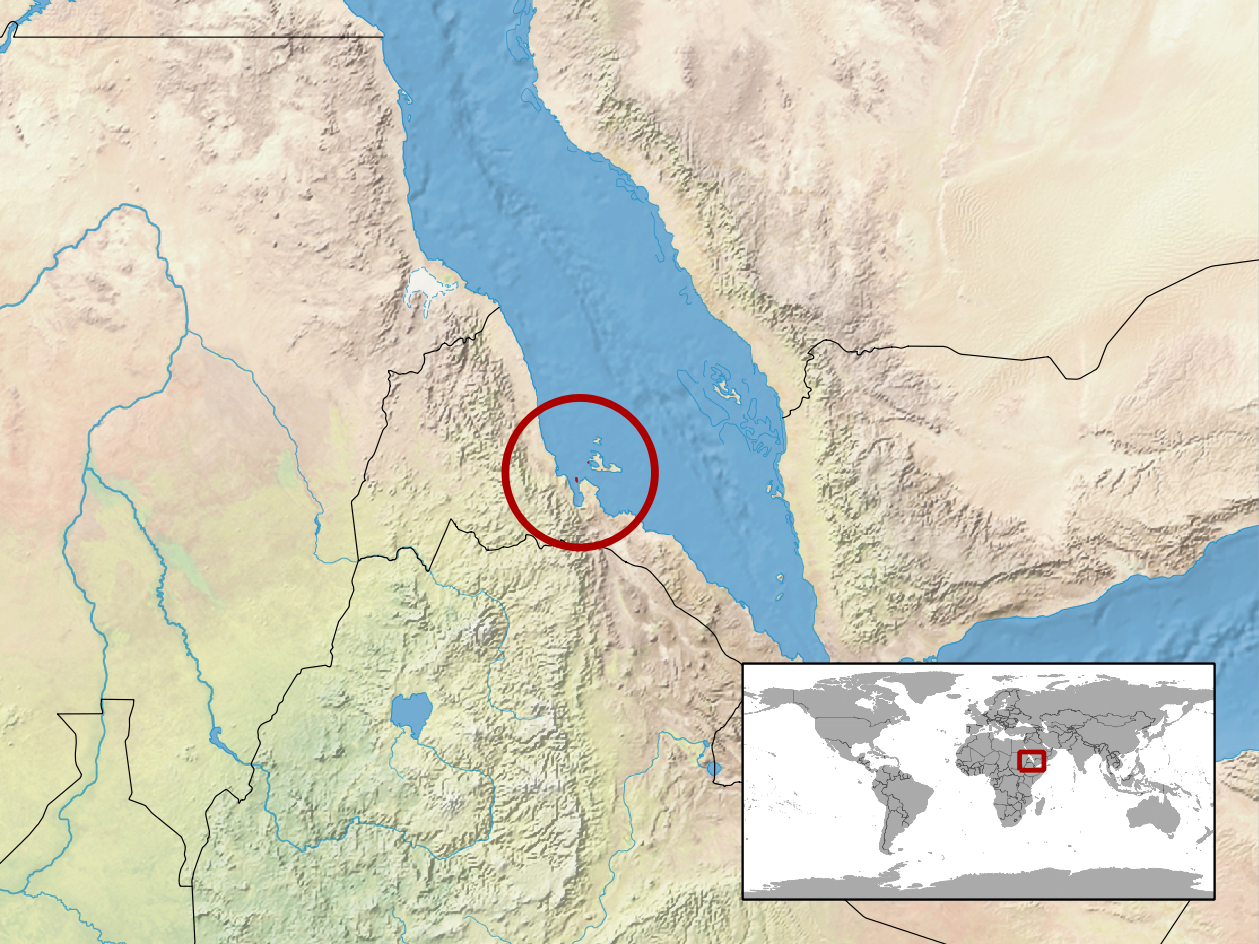

Synonyms
- Echis [(Toxicoa)] megalocephalus Cherlin, 1990; Echis megalocephalus — Golay et al., 1993

Species of snake

Echis megalocephalus, also known commonly as the big-headed carpet viper and Cherlin's saw-scaled viper, is a species of venomous snake in the family Viperidae. The species is endemic to one island in the Red Sea off the coast of Eritrea. There are no subspecies that are recognized as being valid.

== Description ==
E. megalocephalus grows to a total length (including tail) of 54–62 cm (21–24 in), which is relatively large in comparison to other Echis species. The head is similar to that of E. pyramidum. Midbody, there are 31 rows of dorsal scales. The ventrals number 186–202, and the subcaudals 33–37. The color pattern varies, but generally consists of a series of pale, oblique, dorsal blotches set against a darker ground color.

== Geographic range ==
E. megalocephalus is known only from the type locality, Nokra (Nocra) Island, which is part of the Dahlak Archipelago, off the coast of Eritrea in the Red Sea.

== Reproduction ==
E. megalocephalus is oviparous.
