= Red Carpet (disambiguation) =

A red carpet is a red strip of carpet placed on the ground for VIPs to walk on when entering or leaving a building or vehicle.

Red carpet may also refer to:

- Red Carpet (software), a Linux software management tool
- Red Carpet (band), a Belgian house/electronica production act
- Red Carpet, Calgary, Canada
- Red Carpet (film), a 2014 film
- Red Carpet (Nova TV), a Croatian television magazine
- "Red Carpet" (song), a 2015 song by Namie Amuro
- "Red Carpet", a 2022 song by Apink from Horn
- "Red Carpet", a 2024 song by James Blake and Lil Yachty from Bad Cameo
- A part of the storyline in the Greek tragedy Agamemnon, from the trilogy the Oresteia, by Aeschylus (458 BC)
- Red Carpet Club, former name of United Airlines airport lounges
- Red Carpet Inn, a chain of hotels and motels
- Echis pyramidum aliaborri, a viper species known as the red carpet viper
- Xanthorhoe decoloraria, a moth species known as the red carpet

== See also ==
- "Red Carpet (Pause, Flash)", a song by R. Kelly from Happy People/U Saved Me, 2004
