= Echis borkini =

Conservation status
- Least Concern (IUCN 3.1)

Scientific classification
- Kingdom: Animalia
- Phylum: Chordata
- Class: Reptilia
- Order: Squamata
- Suborder: Serpentes
- Family: Viperidae
- Genus: Echis
- Species: E. borkini

Binomial name
- Echis borkini Cherlin, 1990
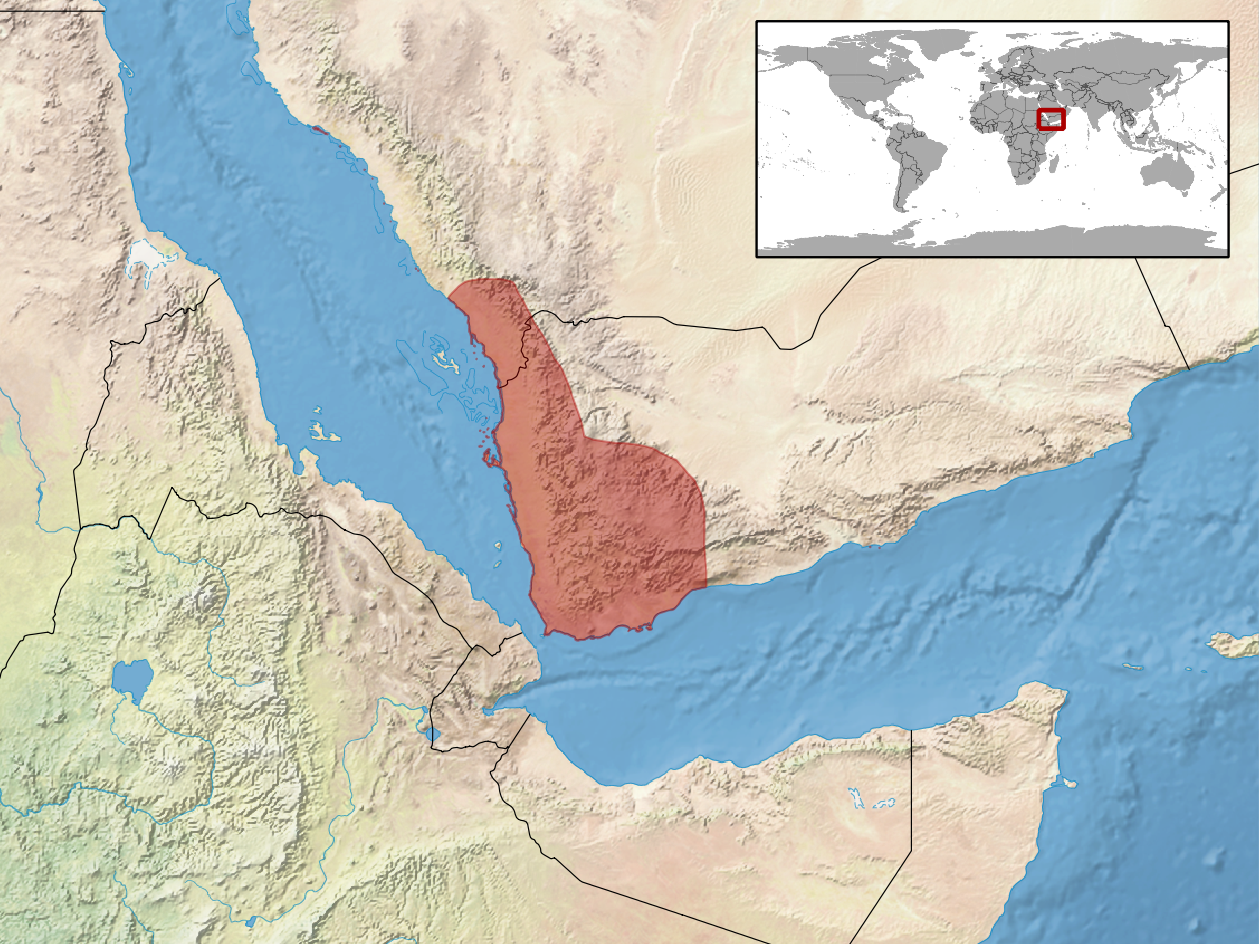

Synonyms
- Echis varius borkini Cherlin, 1990

Species of snake

Echis borkini is a species of viper. Like all vipers, it is venomous. It was originally described as subspecies of Echis varius.

== Geographic range ==
The snake is found in southwestern Saudi Arabia and western Yemen.
