= Echis hughesi =

Conservation status
- Data Deficient (IUCN 3.1)

Scientific classification
- Kingdom: Animalia
- Phylum: Chordata
- Class: Reptilia
- Order: Squamata
- Suborder: Serpentes
- Family: Viperidae
- Genus: Echis
- Species: E. hughesi

Binomial name
- Echis hughesi Cherlin, 1990
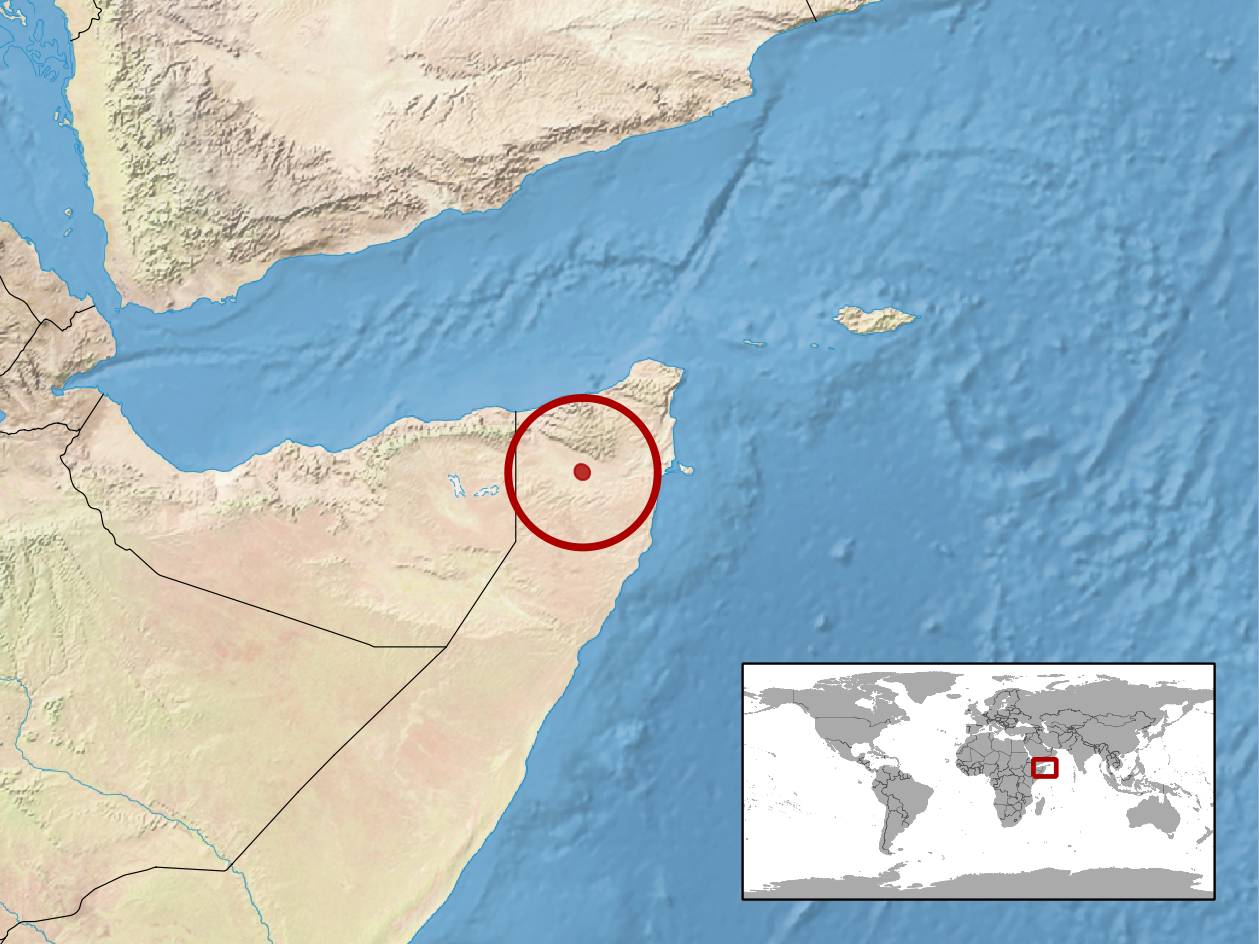

Synonyms
- Echis [(Toxicoa)] hughesi Cherlin, 1990; Echis hughesi — Golay et al., 1993

Species of snake

Echis hughesi, also known commonly as Hughes' carpet viper, the Somali carpet viper, and Hughes' saw-scaled viper, is a species of venomous snake in the subfamily Viperinae of the family Viperidae. The species is endemic to Somalia. There are no subspecies that are recognized as being valid.

== Etymology ==
The specific name, hughesi, is in honor of British herpetologist Barry Hughes.

== Description ==
E. hughesi grows to a total length (including tail) of about 21–32 cm (8.3–12.6 in). The head scalation is similar to that of E. pyramidum. Midbody, there are 24–25 dorsal scale rows. The ventrals number 144–149, and the subcaudals number 28–30. The color pattern varies, but generally consists of a series of pale, oblique, dorsal blotches set against a darker ground color.

== Geographic range ==
E. hughesi is found only in northern Somalia, in northern Migiurtinia, near Meledin.

The type locality is listed as "Somalia, 10°02' [N lat.], 49° [E long.]".

Migiurtinia was the name of a region, or gobolka, in Somalia that is currently known as Bari and occupies about 70,000 km^{2} (27,000 sq mi) of the tip of the Horn of Africa.

== Reproduction ==
E. hughesi is oviparous.
