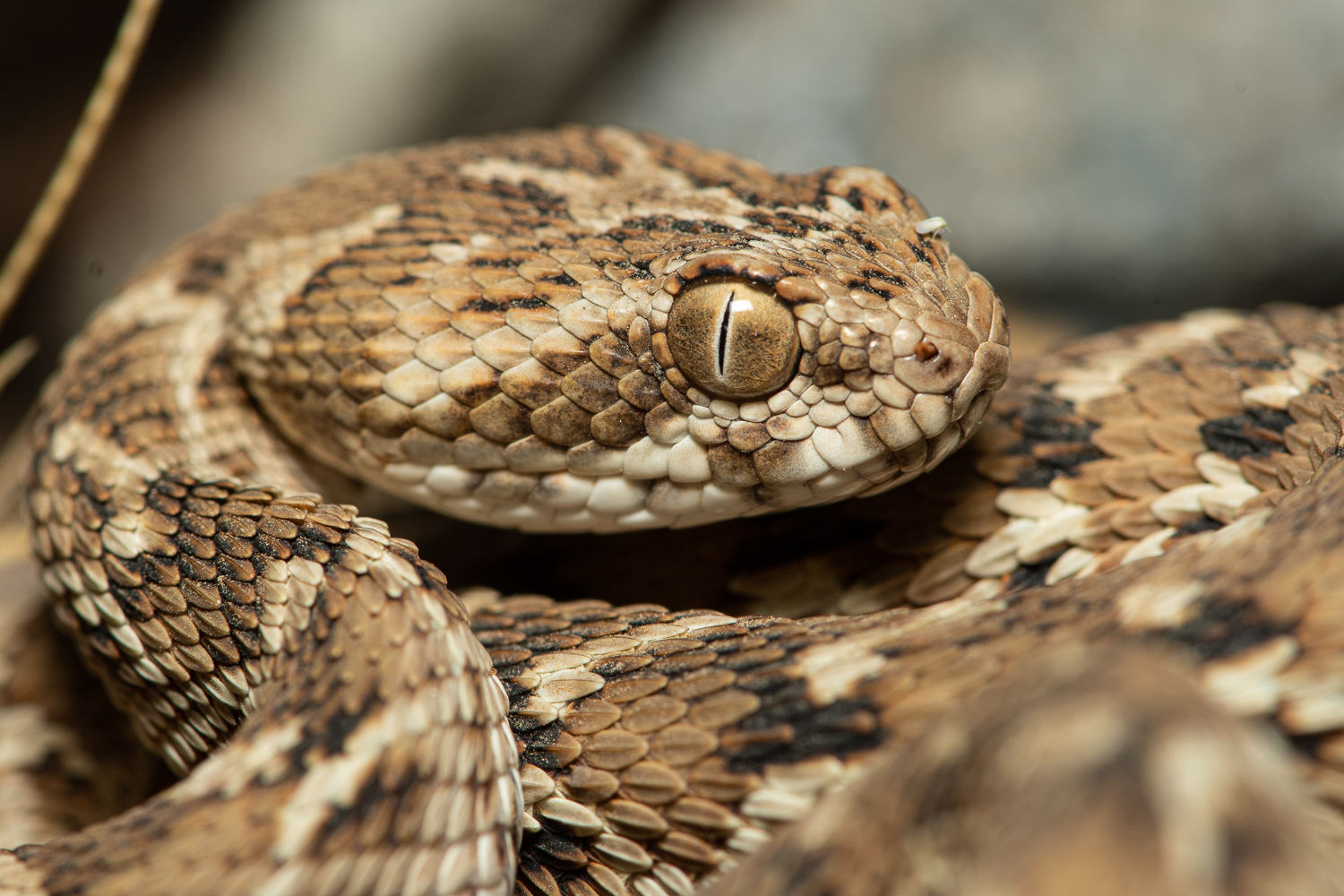

Scientific classification
- Domain: Eukaryota
- Kingdom: Animalia
- Phylum: Chordata
- Class: Reptilia
- Order: Squamata
- Suborder: Serpentes
- Family: Viperidae
- Genus: Echis
- Species: E. carinatus
- Subspecies: E. c. sochureki

Trinomial name
- Echis carinatus sochureki Stemmler, 1969

Synonyms
- Echis carinatus sochureki Stemmler, 1969; Echis sochureki sochureki — Cherlin, 1983; Echis [(Turanechis)] sochureki — Cherlin, 1990; Echis [(Turanechis)] sochureki sochureki — Cherlin, 1990; Echis carinata sochureki — Das, 1996

= Echis carinatus sochureki =

Subspecies of snake

Common names: Sochurek's saw-scaled viper, eastern saw-scaled viper, Stemmler's saw-scaled viper.

Echis carinatus sochureki is a venomous viper subspecies found in India, Pakistan, Afghanistan, Iran, and parts of the Arabian Peninsula.

== Etymology ==
The subspecific name, sochureki, is in honor of Austrian herpetologist Erich Sochurek (1923–1987).

== Description ==
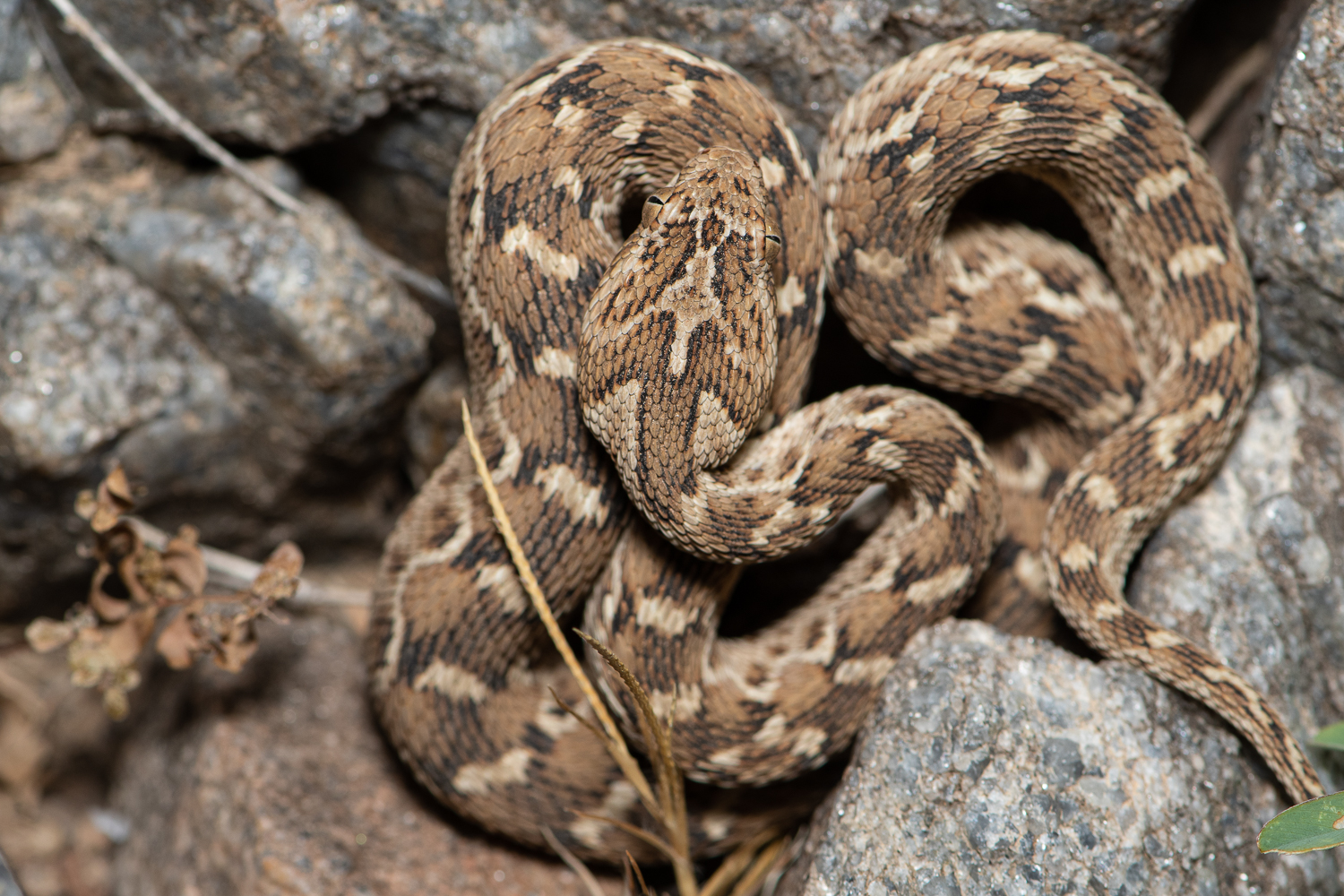
Top View of E. c. sochureki

The head of E. c. sochureki is covered with small scales, except for 3-4 enlarged supraoculars. Midbody there are 29-33 rows of keeled dorsal scales. The keels of the middorsal rows are flat.

The dorsal color pattern consists of a tan, grayish, or brown ground color with a central series of 30 whitish (never yellowish) blotches with dark brown edges. The flanks are marked with a row of wide arcs with distinct dark spots. The belly is whitish, with dark gray flecks. The head has a light arrow mark directed towards the snout. A light loreal stripe extends towards the angle of mouth.

== Geographic range ==
Echis carinatus sochureki is found in Northern India, Pakistan, southern Afghanistan, south and central Iran, the United Arab Emirates, and Oman.

The Wildlife of Pakistan website gives the range as northern India, Pakistan (except the high mountains in north), southern Afghanistan, central Iran to the coast of the Iranian Gulf and Khuzestan.

The type locality is "West Pakistan, Ban Kushdil Khan bei Pishin" (Pishin, West Pakistan).

== Reproduction ==
Echis carinatus sochureki is Viviparous
