= Echis jogeri =

Conservation status
- Data Deficient (IUCN 3.1)

Scientific classification
- Kingdom: Animalia
- Phylum: Chordata
- Class: Reptilia
- Order: Squamata
- Suborder: Serpentes
- Family: Viperidae
- Genus: Echis
- Species: E. jogeri

Binomial name
- Echis jogeri Cherlin, 1990

Synonyms
- Echis (Toxicoa) jogeri Cherlin, 1990

Species of snake

Echis jogeri, also known commonly as Joger's carpet viper, the Mali carpet viper, and Joger's saw-scaled viper, is a species of venomous snake in the family Viperidae. The species is endemic to Mali. There are no subspecies which are recognized as being valid.

== Etymology ==
The specific name, jogeri, is in honor of German herpetologist Ulrich Joger.

== Description ==
E. jogeri is relatively small, averaging only about 30 cm (12 in) in total length (including tail). Its build, however, is relatively stout, the cross-section of which is circular or subtriangular. The scalation of the head is similar to that of E. leucogaster. Midbody, the dorsal scale rows number 27. The ventral scales number 123-136.

Coloration and pattern are both variable. Its color ranges from brown to gray to reddish, and everything in between. Its pattern generally consists of a series of light, oblique, dorsal crossbars or saddles set against a darker ground color. The flanks are lighter in color, normally with a series of triangular, subtriangular, or circular, dark markings with light or white edges. The belly is an unbroken pale cream, white, or ivory.

== Geographic range ==
Echis jogeri is found only in western and central Mali.

The type locality is listed in Russian as "[Mali, 3 km of Tombuktu]" (Mali, 3 km from Timbuktu).

== Habitat ==
The preferred natural habitat of E. jogeri is savanna, at altitudes of 60–426 m (197–1,398 ft).

== Behavior ==
E. jogeri is terrestrial.

== Diet ==
E. jogeri preys predominately upon centipedes.
