= Big Four (Indian snakes) =

Group of venomous Indian snakes

The four venomous snake species responsible for causing the greatest number of medically significant human snake bite cases on the Indian subcontinent (majorly in India and Sri Lanka) are sometimes collectively referred to as the Big Four. They cause 46,000–60,000 deaths each year. The snakes are:

1. Russell's viper, Daboia russelii
2. Common krait, Bungarus caeruleus
3. Indian cobra, Naja naja
4. Indian saw-scaled viper, Echis carinatus
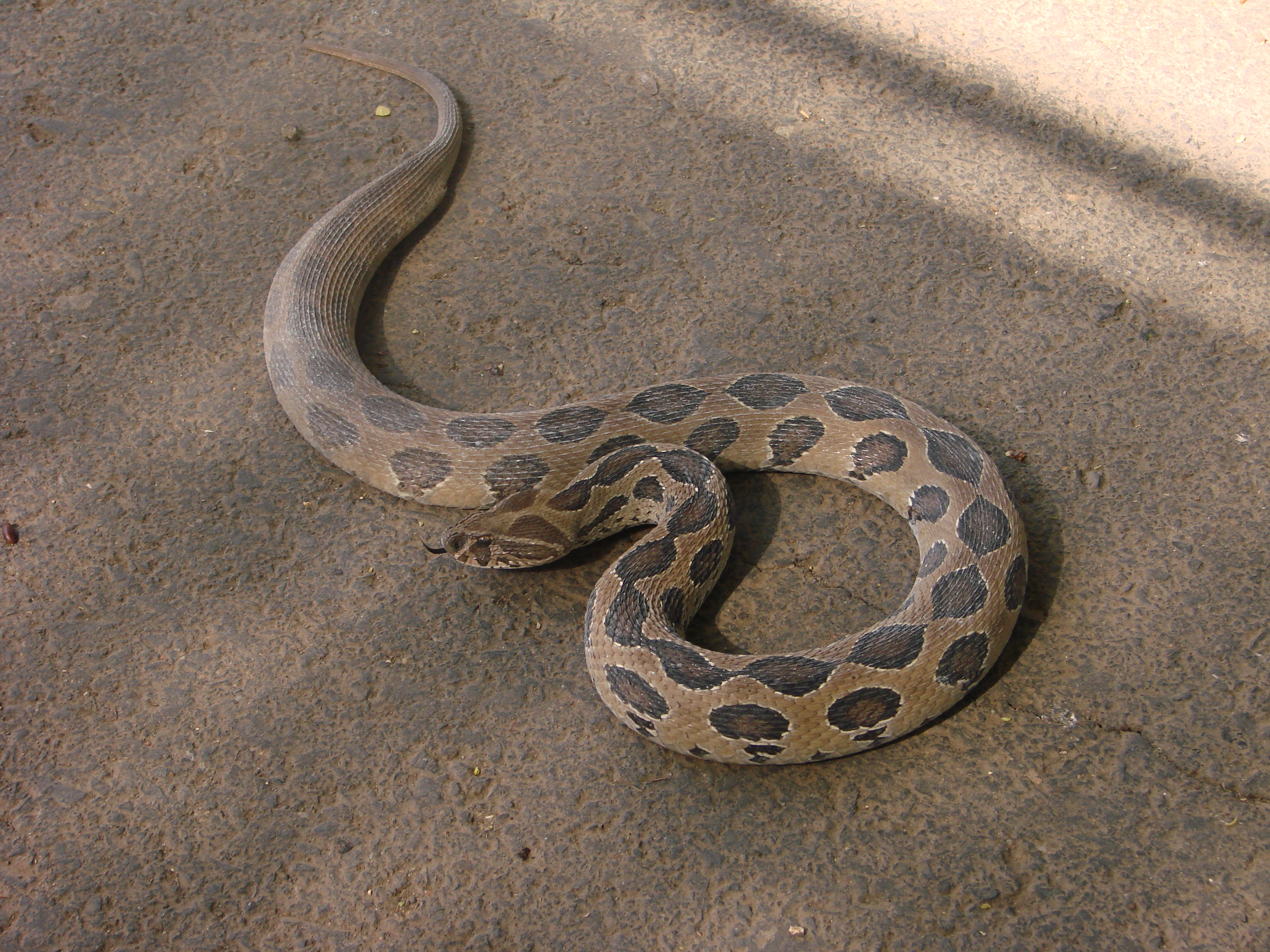
Daboia russelii, Russell's viper

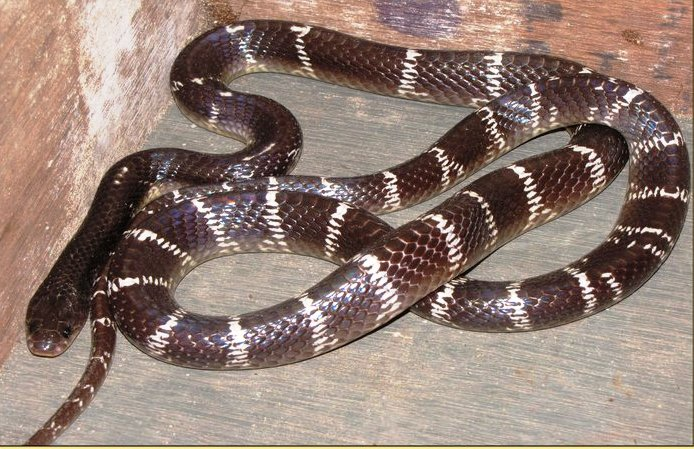
Bungarus caeruleus, the common krait

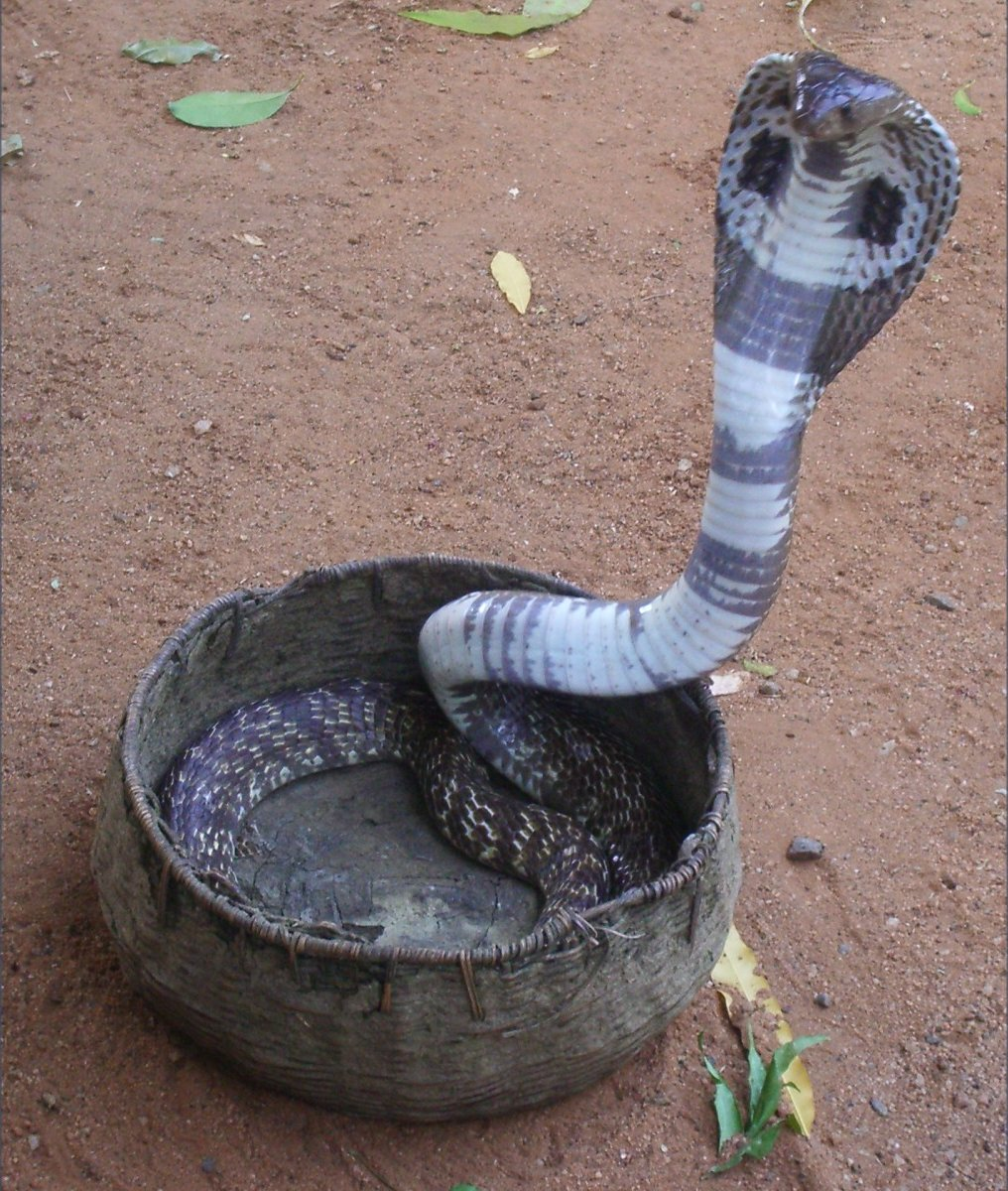
Naja naja, the Indian cobra

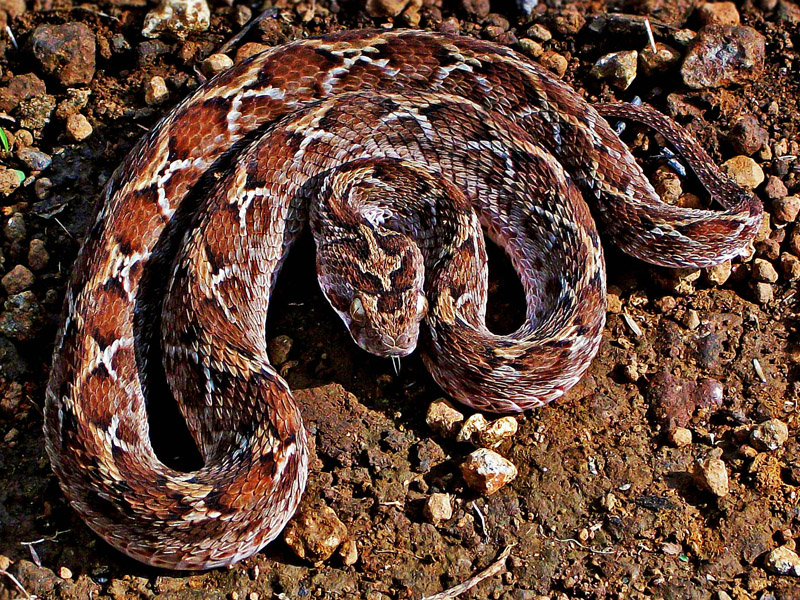
Echis carinatus, the saw-scaled viper

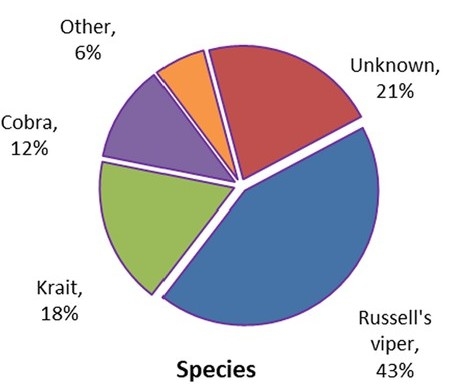
Snakebites by species in India

According to a 2020 study that did a comprehensive analysis of snake bites in India, Russell's viper accounted for 43% of the snakebites in India, followed by kraits (18%), cobras (12%), hump nosed viper (4%), saw-scaled viper (1.7%), and water snake (0.3%). The rest (21%) were of unidentified species.

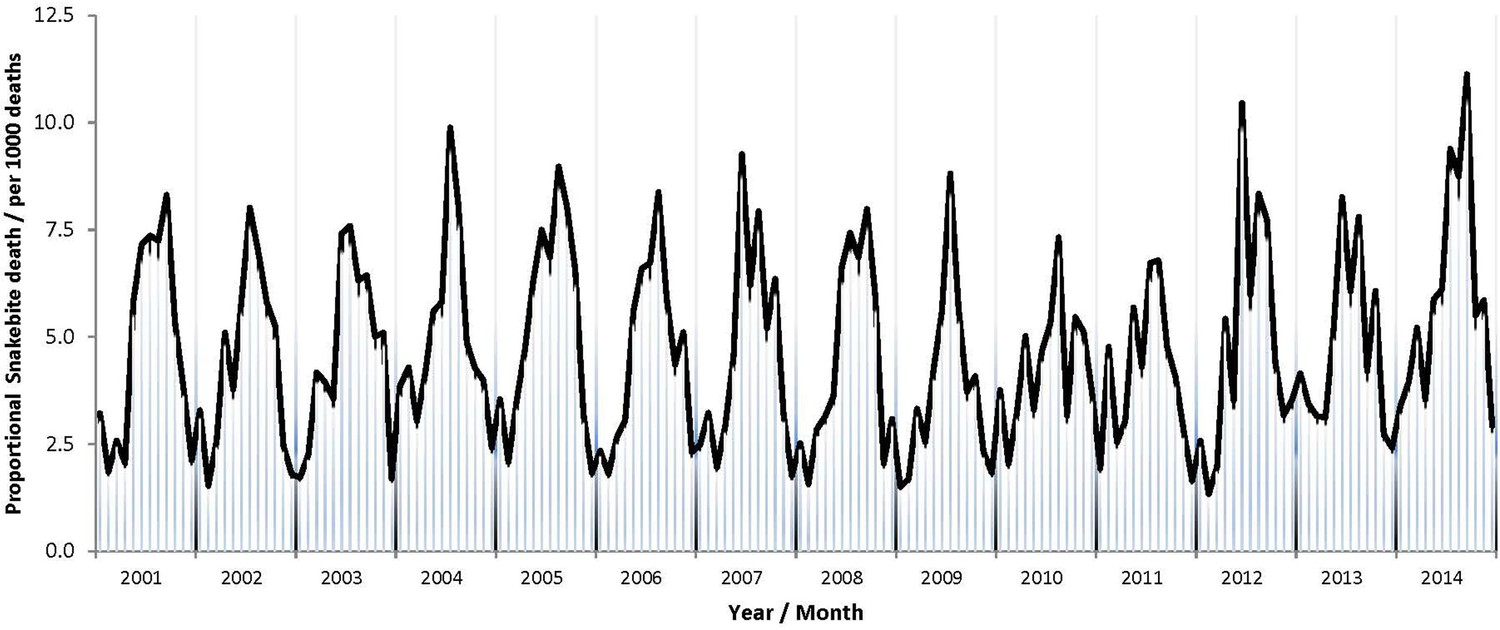
Seasonality of snakebite deaths in India

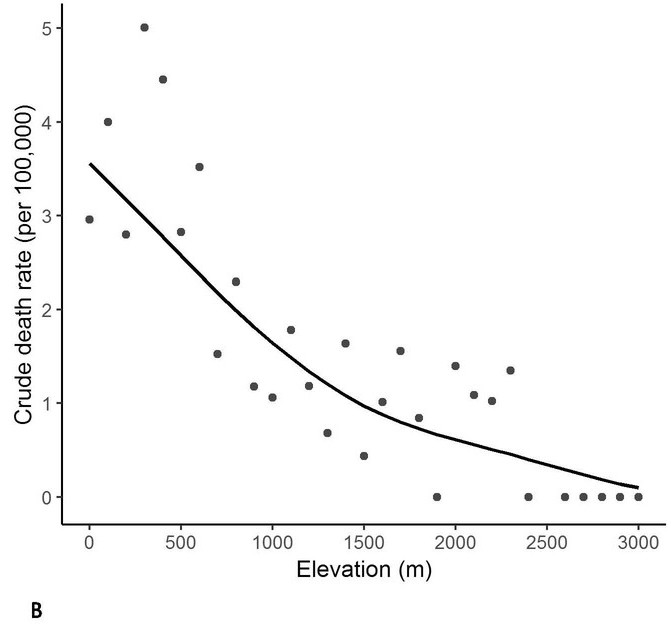
Snakebite death rates by altitude

== Treatment ==
A polyvalent serum that effectively neutralizes the venom of the Big Four is widely available in India, and is frequently administered to save lives.
