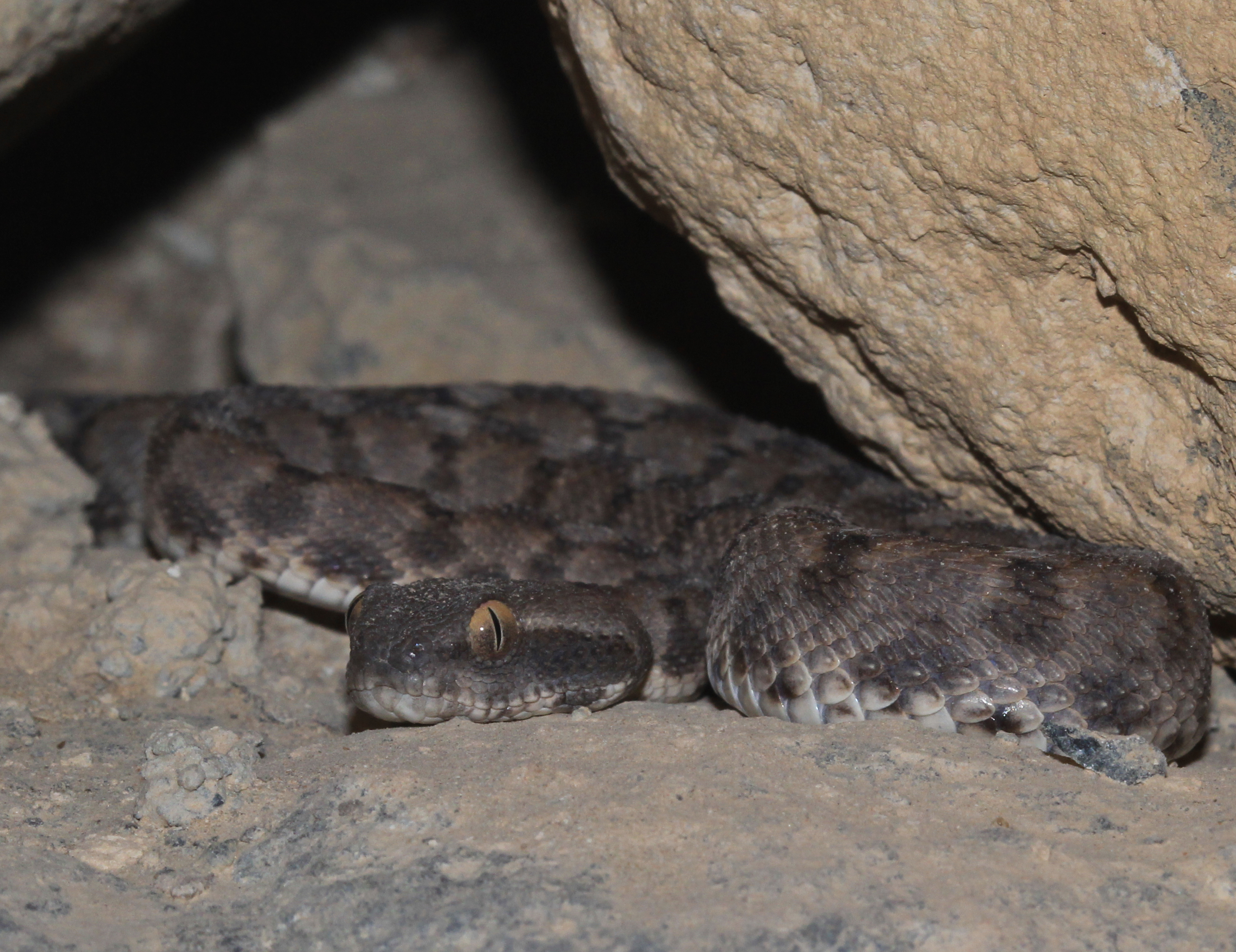
- Echis omanensis from the United Arab Emirates.

Conservation status
- Least Concern (IUCN 3.1)

Scientific classification
- Kingdom: Animalia
- Phylum: Chordata
- Class: Reptilia
- Order: Squamata
- Suborder: Serpentes
- Family: Viperidae
- Genus: Echis
- Species: E. omanensis

Binomial name
- Echis omanensis Babocsay, 2004
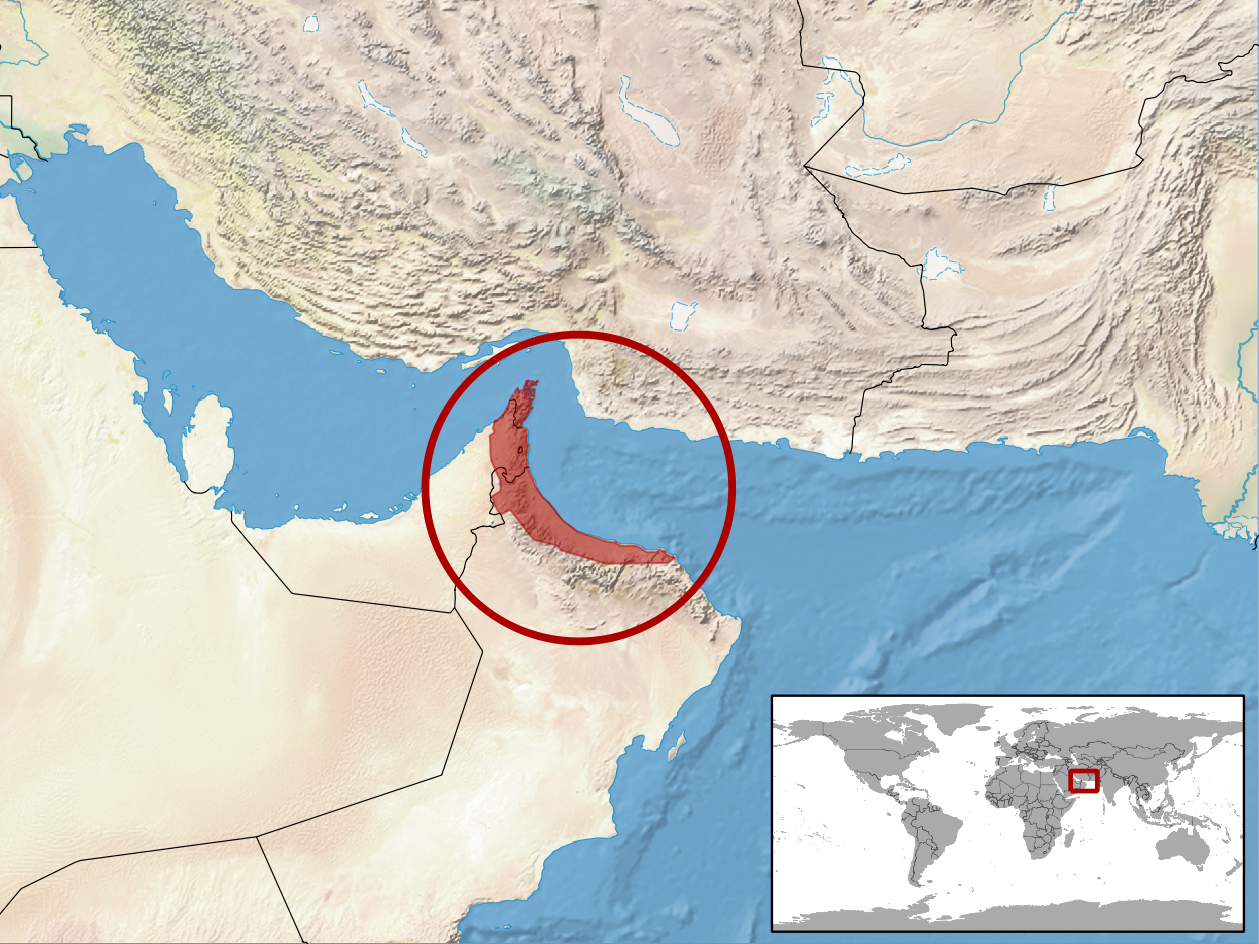

= Echis omanensis =

Species of snake

Echis omanensis, commonly known as the Oman saw-scaled viper, is a species of viper. Like all other vipers, it is venomous.

== Geographic range ==
The snake is found in eastern Oman and the United Arab Emirates. It is present from sea level up to an altitude of 1000 meters.

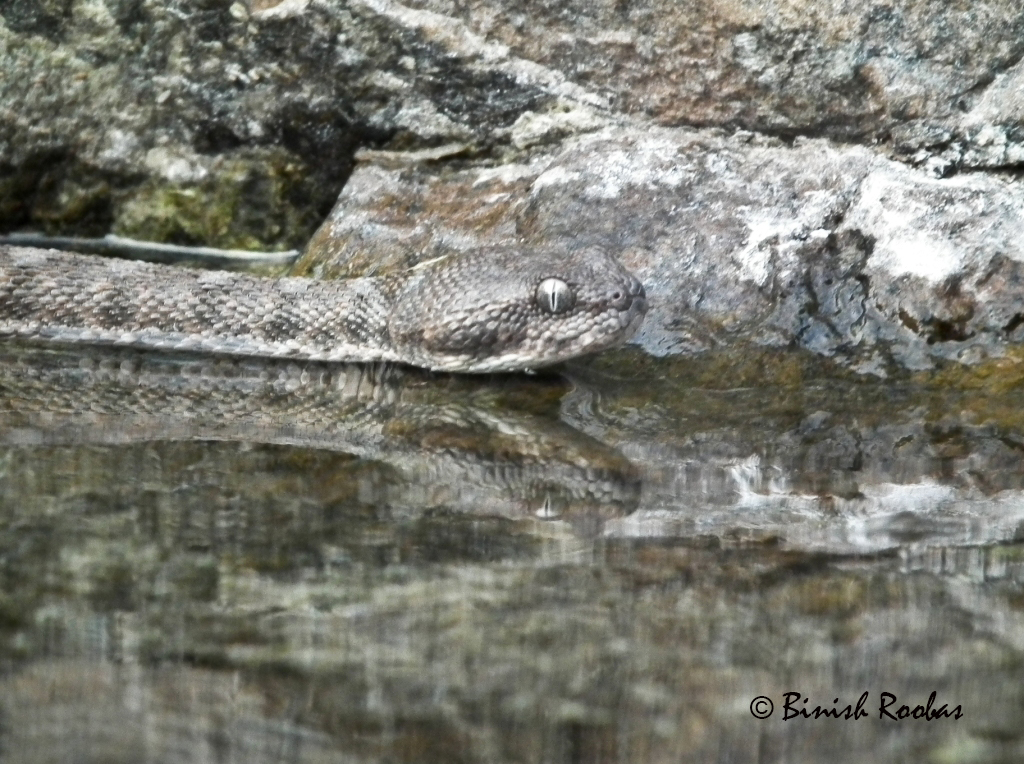
Echis omanensis from Wadi Wurrayah National Park.
