= Ecarin clotting time =

Laboratory test

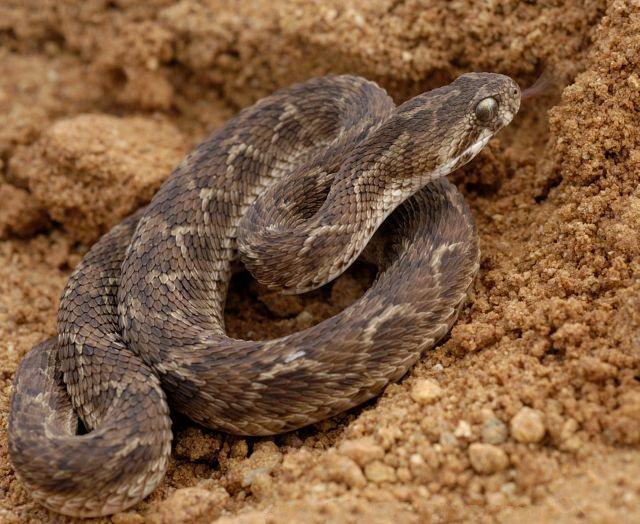
- Saw-scaled viper, Echis carinatus
- Purpose: used to monitor anticoagulation during treatment with hirudin

Ecarin clotting time (ECT) is a laboratory test used to monitor anticoagulation during treatment with hirudin, an anticoagulant medication which was originally isolated from leech saliva. Ecarin, the primary reagent in this assay, is derived from the venom of the saw-scaled viper, Echis carinatus.

In the clinical assay, a known quantity of ecarin is added to the plasma of a patient treated with hirudin. Ecarin activates prothrombin through a specific proteolytic cleavage, which produces meizothrombin, a prothrombin-thrombin intermediate which retains the full molecular weight of prothrombin, but possesses a low level of procoagulant enzymatic activity. Crucially, this activity is inhibited by hirudin and other direct thrombin inhibitors, but not by heparin. The ECT is also unaffected by prior treatment with warfarin or the presence of phospholipid-dependent anticoagulants, such as lupus anticoagulant. Thus, the ECT is prolonged in a specific and linear fashion with increasing concentrations of hirudin. An enhancement of the ECT is the ecarin chromogenic assay (ECA) in which diluted sample is mixed with an excess of purified prothrombin and the generated meizothrombin is measured with a specific chromogenic substrate. This assay shows no interference from prothrombin or fibrinogen in the sample and is suitable for the measurement of all direct thrombin inhibitors.
