= Ecarin =

Identifiers
- EC no.: 3.4.24.-

Databases
- BRENDA: enzyme data
- ExPASy: NiceZyme view
- KEGG: enzyme entry
- MetaCyc: metabolic pathway
- Rhea: reactions
- PDB structures: RCSB PDB PDBe PDBsum
Search
- PMC: articles
- PubMed: articles
- NCBI: proteins

Ecarin is an metalloprotease enzyme that is derived from the venom of the Indian saw-scaled viper, Echis carinatus, It is the primary reagent in the Ecarin clotting time test.

Ecarin is known to activate prothrombin, another protein that is a critical component of the blood clotting cascade.

== Origin ==
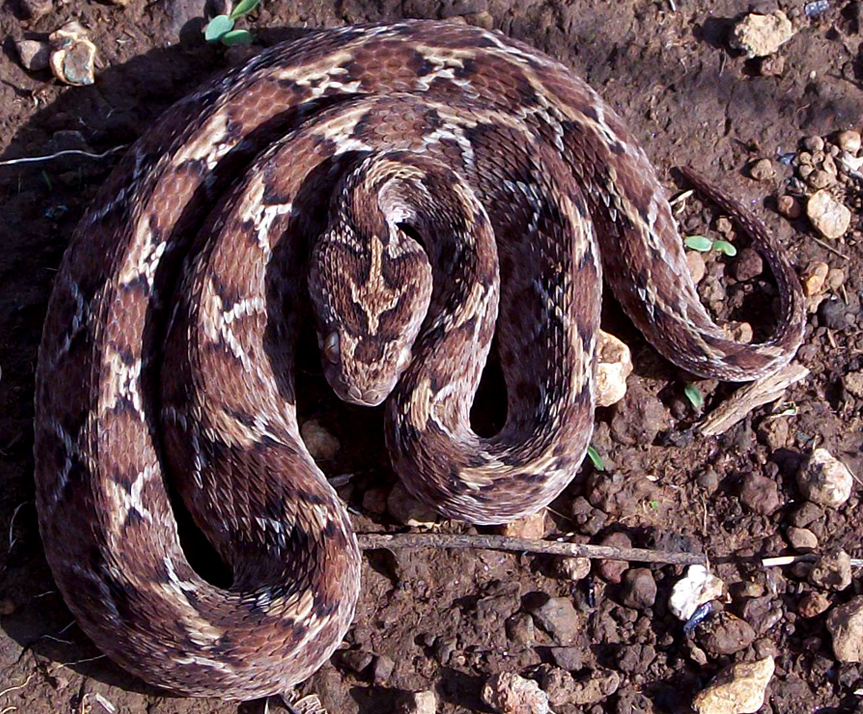
Ecarin is present in the venom of the saw-scaled viper (Echis carinatus).

The venom of the saw-scaled viper, Echis carinatus, causes bleeding and eventually death. The venom contains ecarin, which converts prothrombin to meizothrombin, a thrombin analog with increased esterase activity, and not to normal thrombin.

== Clinical Use ==
Ecarin is a highly versatile drug compound used in blood clotting experiments and for monitoring and treating a range of diseases, including cancer, liver diseases, lupus, and cardiovascular disorders.

=== Testing ===
Ecarin-based assays are tests that have the prospect to be clinically helpful in detecting vitamin K deficiency and lupus anticoagulant. The Ecarin clotting time (ECT) is a test that is widely used for lupus anticoagulant testing in certain regions. Ecarin-based testing is used to monitor dabigatran etexilate, a thrombin inhibitor, with both clot-based and chromogenic-based methods available.

In 2015, it was reported that 30% of oral anticoagulants prescribed for Medicare patients in the United States were direct oral anticoagulants (DOACs), with dabigatran being a popular choice among cardiologists and internal medicine physicians. This is largely due to the drug's safety and efficacy. It has been shown to be effective in preventing stroke and systemic embolism, and has a lower risk of bleeding compared to warfarin. Monitoring the effects of dabigatran can be challenging, as traditional coagulation tests such as the prothrombin time (PT) and activated partial thromboplastin time (aPTT) are not sensitive to the drug's effects. This is where Ecarin-based testing comes in, as it provides a more accurate measure of dabigatran's anticoagulant effect.

== Research ==
Ecarin is a glycoprotein with unique metalloproteinase properties. It has a molecular weight of 56,000 and has been found to specifically activate only prothrombin due to its strict substrate specificity. To compare the covalent structures of Ecarin and RVV-X, researchers have determined the complete cDNA sequence and translated protein sequence of Ecarin.
