= Echis pyramidum leakeyi =

Scientific classification
- Domain: Eukaryota
- Kingdom: Animalia
- Phylum: Chordata
- Class: Reptilia
- Order: Squamata
- Suborder: Serpentes
- Family: Viperidae
- Genus: Echis
- Species: E. pyramidum
- Subspecies: E. p. leakeyi

Trinomial name
- Echis pyramidum leakeyi Stemmler & Sochurek, 1969

Synonyms
- Echis carinatus leakeyi Stemmler & Sochurek, 1969; Echis p[yramidum]. leakeyi — Sochurek, 1983; Echis [(Toxicoa)] pyramidum leakeyi — Sochurek, 1990; Echis pyramidum leakeyi — Golay et al., 1993

Subspecies of snake

Common names: Kenyan carpet viper, Leakey's saw-scaled viper.

Echis pyramidum leakeyi is a venomous viper subspecies endemic to northern East Africa.

== Etymology ==
The specific name, leakeyi, is in honor of Kenyan herpetologist J.H.E. Leakey.

== Geographic range ==
Echis pyramidum leakeyi is found in southwestern Ethiopia (Lake Stephanie), northwestern Kenya, and southern Somalia.

The type locality is "Nord-Kenya, West-Ufer des Baringo-Sees, Campi ya Samaki, ca. 1000 m. H" (= North Kenya, west bank of Lake Baringo, Camp ya Samaka, ca. 3,300 ft).
