= Echis khosatzkii =

Conservation status
- Least Concern (IUCN 3.1)

Scientific classification
- Domain: Eukaryota
- Kingdom: Animalia
- Phylum: Chordata
- Class: Reptilia
- Order: Squamata
- Suborder: Serpentes
- Family: Viperidae
- Genus: Echis
- Species: E. khosatzkii

Binomial name
- Echis khosatzkii Cherlin, 1990
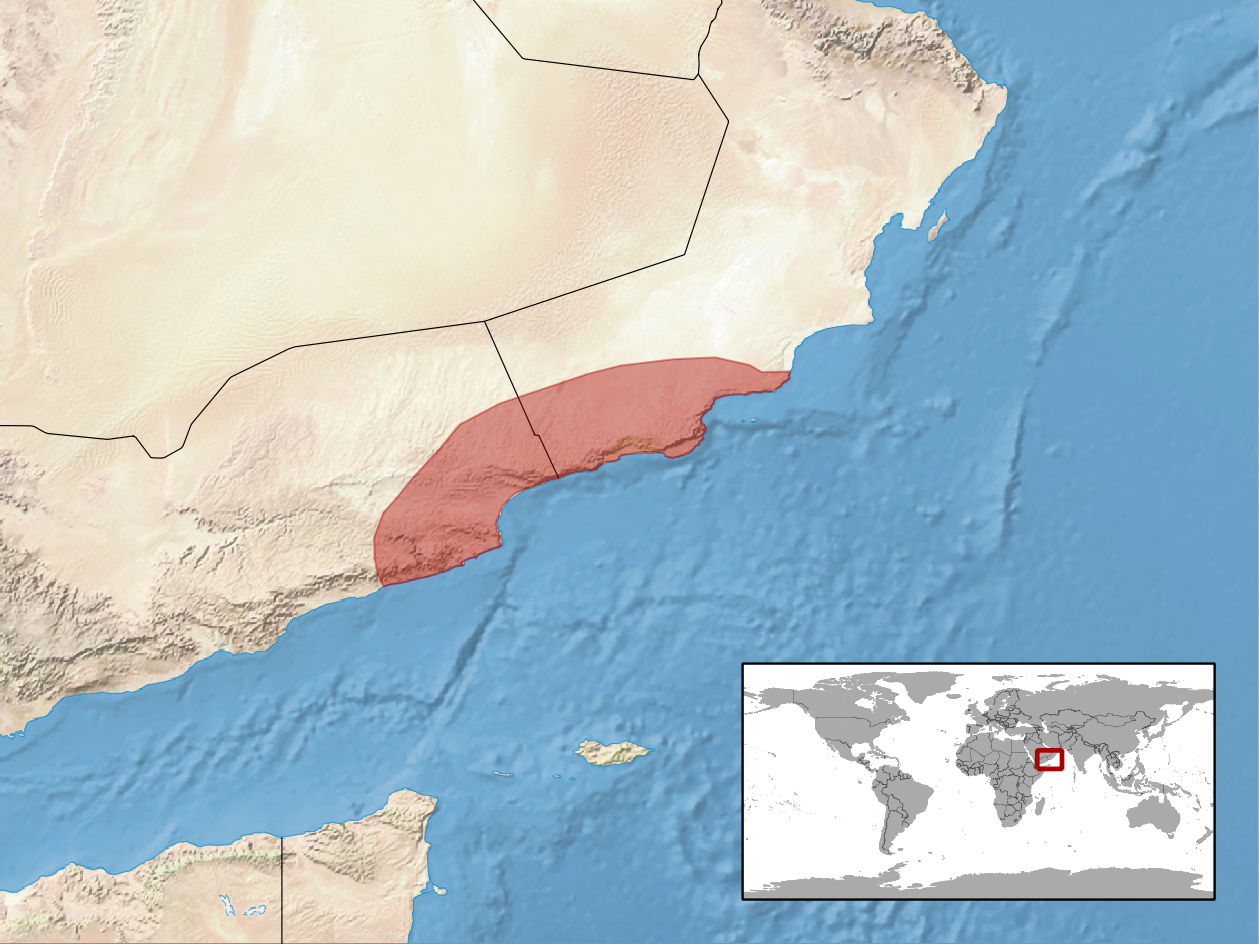

Species of snake

Echis khosatzkii is a species of viper. Like all other vipers, it is venomous.

== Geographic range ==
The snake is found in Oman and eastern Yemen.
