= Roman's carpet viper =

Scientific classification
- Kingdom: Animalia
- Phylum: Chordata
- Class: Reptilia
- Order: Squamata
- Suborder: Serpentes
- Family: Viperidae
- Genus: Echis
- Species: E. romani

Binomial name
- Echis romani Trape, 2018

Species of snake

Roman's carpet viper (Echis romani) is a species of viper native mainly to Nigeria and southwestern Chad. Like all other vipers, it is venomous.
