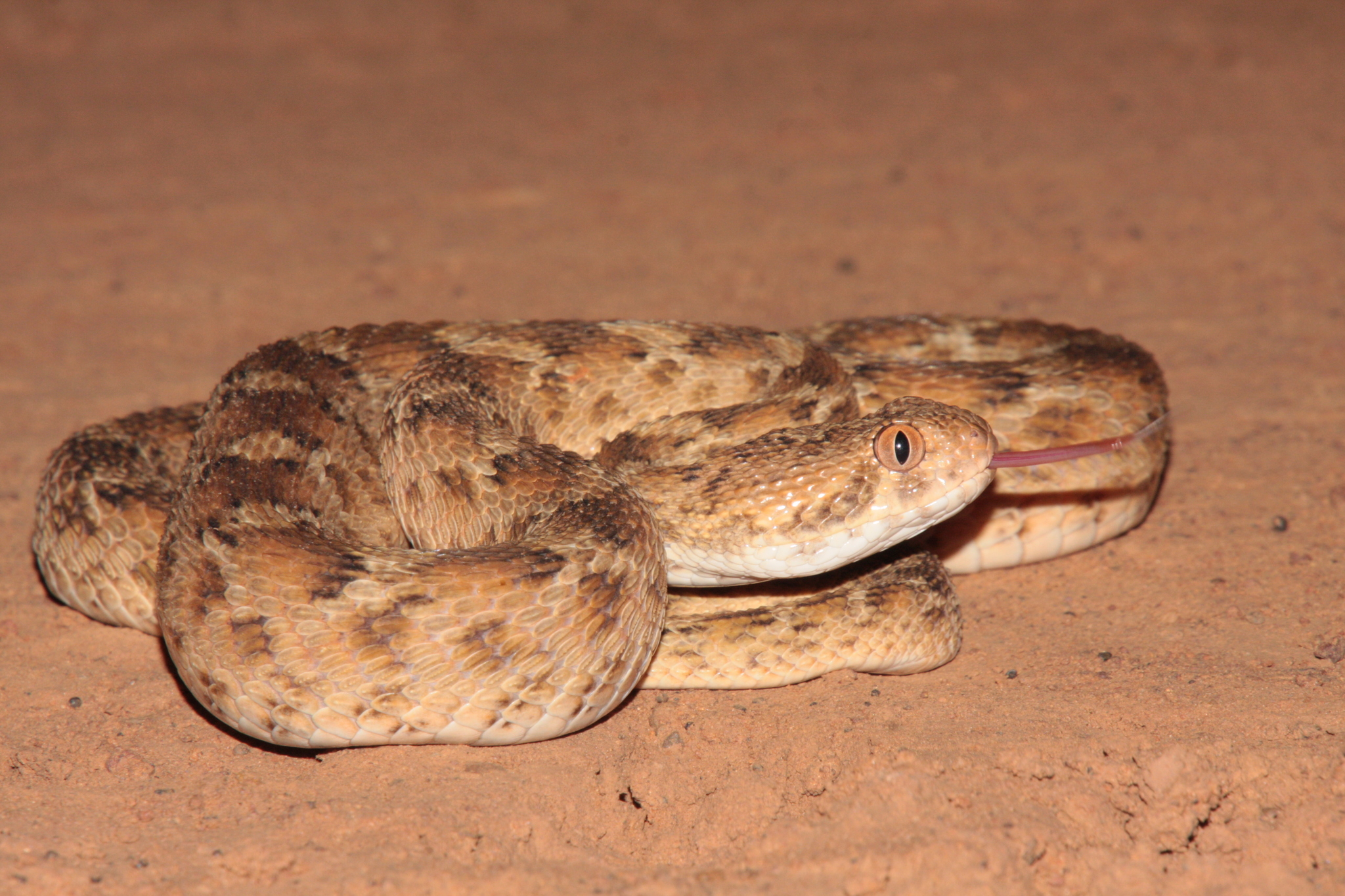

Conservation status
- Least Concern (IUCN 3.1)

Scientific classification
- Kingdom: Animalia
- Phylum: Chordata
- Class: Reptilia
- Order: Squamata
- Suborder: Serpentes
- Family: Viperidae
- Genus: Echis
- Species: E. leucogaster

Binomial name
- Echis leucogaster Roman, 1972

Synonyms
- Echis carinatus leucogaster Roman, 1972; Echis leucogaster — Roman, 1975; Echis [(Toxicoa)] arenicola leucogaster — Cherlin, 1990; Echis leucogaster — Golay et al., 1993

= Echis leucogaster =

Species of snake

Echis leucogaster, also known as the white-bellied carpet viper or the Roman's saw-scaled viper, is a viper species endemic to West and Northwest Africa. Its scientific name derives from its white (leuco-), unmarked belly (gaster). like all other vipers, it is venomous. No subspecies are currently recognized.

== Description ==
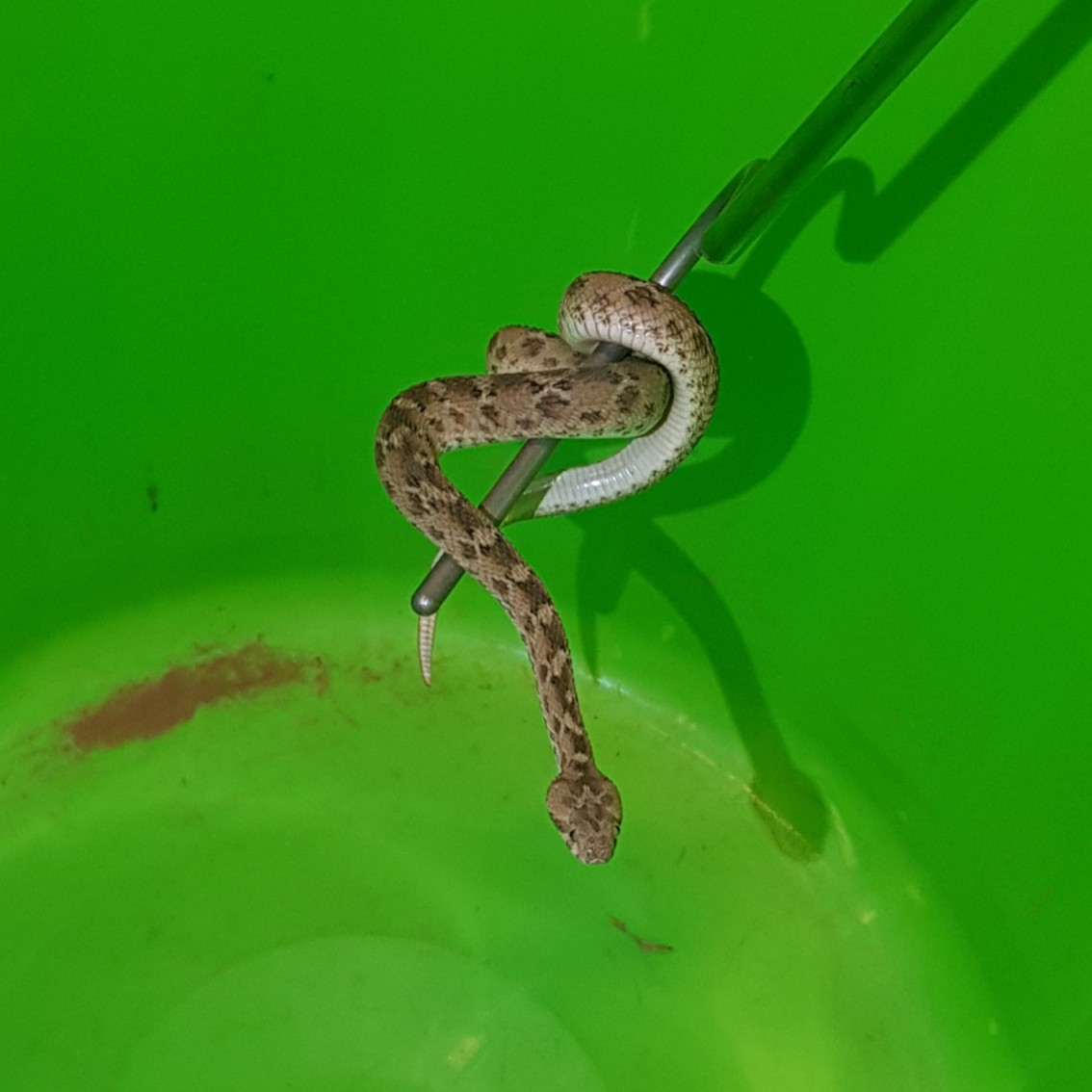
Echis Leucogaster

It grows to an average total length (body + tail) of 30–70 cm (12–28 in), with a maximum total length of 87 cm (34 in). The scalation of the head is similar to E. carinatus. The body is rather stout, the cross-section of which is circular or subtriangular. The dorsal scales are rough and heavily keeled. At midbody, there are 27-33 rows of dorsal scales. The ventral scales number 165-180.

Coloration and pattern are both variable. Color ranges from brown to gray to reddish and everything in between. Pattern generally consists of a series of light, oblique, dorsal crossbars or saddles set against a darker ground color. The flanks are lighter in color, normally with a series of triangular, subtriangular, or circular, dark markings with light or white edges. The belly is an unbroken pale cream, white, or ivory.

== Geographic range ==
In West Africa it is found in northern Nigeria, western Niger, Burkina Faso, central Mali, northern Guinea, and Senegal. In Northwest Africa it is found in southern Mauritania, Western Sahara, Algeria (Ahaggar), and in the south of Morocco.

Roman (1975) described the type locality as "Boubon, à 20 km au Nord de Niamey, Niger".

According to Golay et al. (1993), the range includes Nigeria, Niger, Upper Volta, southern Algeria and Mauritania.

Spawls and Branch (1995) describe the range as extending from the southern half of Mauritania, Senegal and northern Guinea, through central Mali to northern Burkina Faso and western Niger. However, they are not sure whether or not the specimens from southern Morocco and the Ahaggar are connected to the main population. They also regard some of the specimens from Senegal and northern Mali as problematic.

== Habitat ==
Not a true desert animal, it is found along edges of deserts. It is associated with arid savannah, semi-desert, Sahel, and well-vegetated dry river beds (wadis) and oases.

== Diet ==
It eats a wide variety of prey, including invertebrates (especially scorpions and centipedes), small mammals and reptiles.

== Reproduction ==
It is known to lay eggs. Hatchlings are 12–16 cm (4.7–6.3 in) in total length.
