= Echis pyramidum aliaborri =

Scientific classification
- Domain: Eukaryota
- Kingdom: Animalia
- Phylum: Chordata
- Class: Reptilia
- Order: Squamata
- Suborder: Serpentes
- Family: Viperidae
- Genus: Echis
- Species: E. pyramidum
- Subspecies: E. p. aliaborri

Trinomial name
- Echis pyramidum aliaborri Drews & Sacherer, 1974

Synonyms
- Echis carinatus aliaborri Drews & Sacherer, 1974; Echis p[yramidum]. aliaborri — Cherlin, 1983; Echis [(Toxicoa)] varia aliaborri — Cherlin, 1990; Echis pyramidum aliaborri — Golay et al., 1993

Subspecies of snake

Common names: red carpet viper, Kenyan carpet viper.

Echis pyramidum aliaborri is a venomous viper subspecies endemic to northern Kenya.

== Description ==
It is distinguished from other subspecies of E. pyramidum by its relatively large supraocular scales and characteristic red-orange color.

== Geographic range ==
It is found only in northern Kenya.

The type locality is described as "approximately 8 km north of Wajir Town, Wajir District, Kenya".
