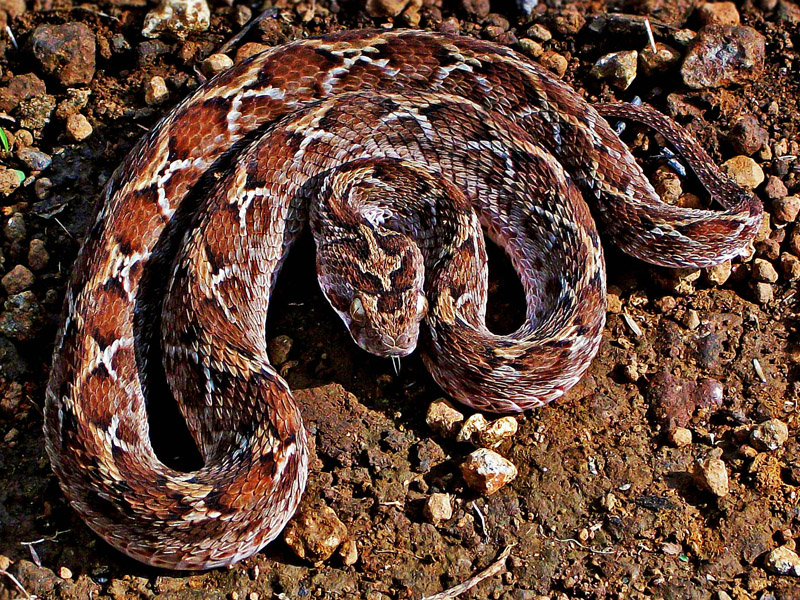
- Echis carinatus in Mangaon (Maharashtra, India)

Scientific classification
- Kingdom: Animalia
- Phylum: Chordata
- Class: Reptilia
- Order: Squamata
- Suborder: Serpentes
- Family: Viperidae
- Subfamily: Viperinae
- Genus: Echis; Merrem, 1820

Synonyms
- Toxicoa Gray, 1849; Turanechis Cherlin, 1990

= Echis =

Genus of snakes

Echis (common names: saw-scaled vipers, carpet vipers) is a genus of vipers found in the dry regions of Africa, the Middle East, India, Sri Lanka and Pakistan. They have a characteristic threat display, rubbing sections of their body together to produce a "sizzling" warning sound. The name Echis is the Latin transliteration of the Greek word for "viper" (ἔχις). Like all vipers, they are venomous. Their common name is "saw-scaled vipers" and they include some of the species responsible for causing the most snakebite cases and deaths in the world. Twelve species are currently recognized.

== Description ==
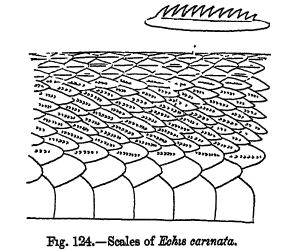
Closeup: scales with serrated keels

Saw-scaled vipers are relatively small snakes, the largest species (E. leucogaster, E. pyramidum) usually below 90 cm (35 in) long, and the smallest (E. hughesi, E. jogeri) being around 30 cm (12 in).

The head is relatively small and is short, wide, pear-shaped and distinct from the neck. The snout is short and rounded, while the eyes are relatively large and the body is moderately slender and cylindrical. The dorsal scales are mostly keeled. However, the scales on the lower flanks stick out at a distinct 45° angle and have a central ridge, or keel, that is serrated (hence the common name). The tail is short and the subcaudals are single.

A saw-scaled viper of the genus Echis may be responsible for biblical claims of a fiery flying serpent.

== Geographic range ==
Species of this genus are found in Pakistan, India (in rocky regions of Gujarat, Maharashtra, Rajasthan, Uttar Pradesh, and Punjab) and Sri Lanka, parts of the Middle East, and Africa north of the equator.

== Behaviour ==
All members of this genus have a distinctive threat display, which involves forming a series of parallel, C-shaped coils and rubbing their scales together to produce a sizzling sound, rather like water on a hot plate. The proper term for this is stridulation. As they become more agitated, this stridulating behavior becomes faster and louder. This display is thought to have evolved as a means of limiting water loss, such as might occur when hissing. However, some authors describe this display as being accompanied by loud hissing.

These snakes can be fierce and are quick to strike. They will strike from the position described above. When doing so, they may overbalance and end up moving towards their aggressor (an unusual behavior for snakes).

Saw-scaled vipers are highly defensive compared to many of their cousins and they are very easy to provoke, so they might strike quickly.

== Diet ==
Little is known about the diets of some Echis species. For others, their diets are reported to be extremely varied, and may include items such as locusts, beetles, worms, slugs, spiders(including Tarantulas), scorpions, centipedes, solifugids, frogs, toads, reptiles (including other snakes), small mammals, and birds.

== Reproduction ==
Most Echis species, such as those found in Africa, are oviparous, while others, such as those in India, are viviparous.

== Venom ==
The snake venom of Echis species consists mostly of four types of toxins: neurotoxins, cardiotoxins, hemotoxins, and cytotoxins. The genus is recognized as medically significant in many tropical rural areas. They are widespread and live in areas lacking modern medical facilities. Most victims are bitten after dark when these snakes are active.

Most of these species have venom that contains factors that can cause a consumption coagulopathy and defibrination, which may persist for days to weeks. This may result in bleeding anywhere in the body, including the possibility of an intracranial hemorrhage. The latter classically occurs a few days following the bite.

Venom toxicity varies among the different species, geographic locations, individual specimens, sexes, over the seasons, different milkings, and, of course, the method of injection (subcutaneous, intramuscular, or intravenous). Consequently, the LD_{50} values for Echis venoms differ significantly. In mice, the intravenous LD_{50} ranges from 2.3 mg/kg (U.S. Navy, 1991) to 24.1 mg/kg (Christensen, 1955) to 0.44–0.48 mg/kg (Cloudsley-Thompson, 1988). In humans, the lethal dose is estimated to be up to 5 mg in some subspecies (Daniels, J. C. 2002). Venom from females was more than twice as toxic on average as venom from males.

The amount of venom produced also varies. Reported yields include 20–35 mg of dried venom from specimens 41–56 cm in length, 6–48 mg (16 mg average) from Iranian specimens and 13–35 mg of dried venom from animals from various other localities. Yield varies seasonally, as well as between the sexes: the most venom is produced during the summer months and males produce more than females.

== Species ==
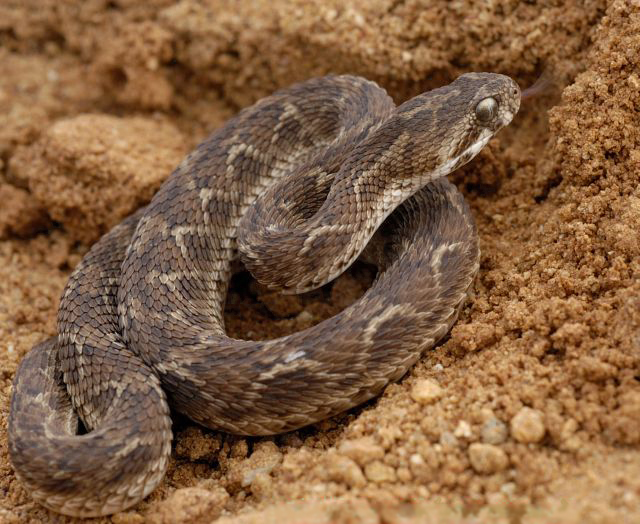
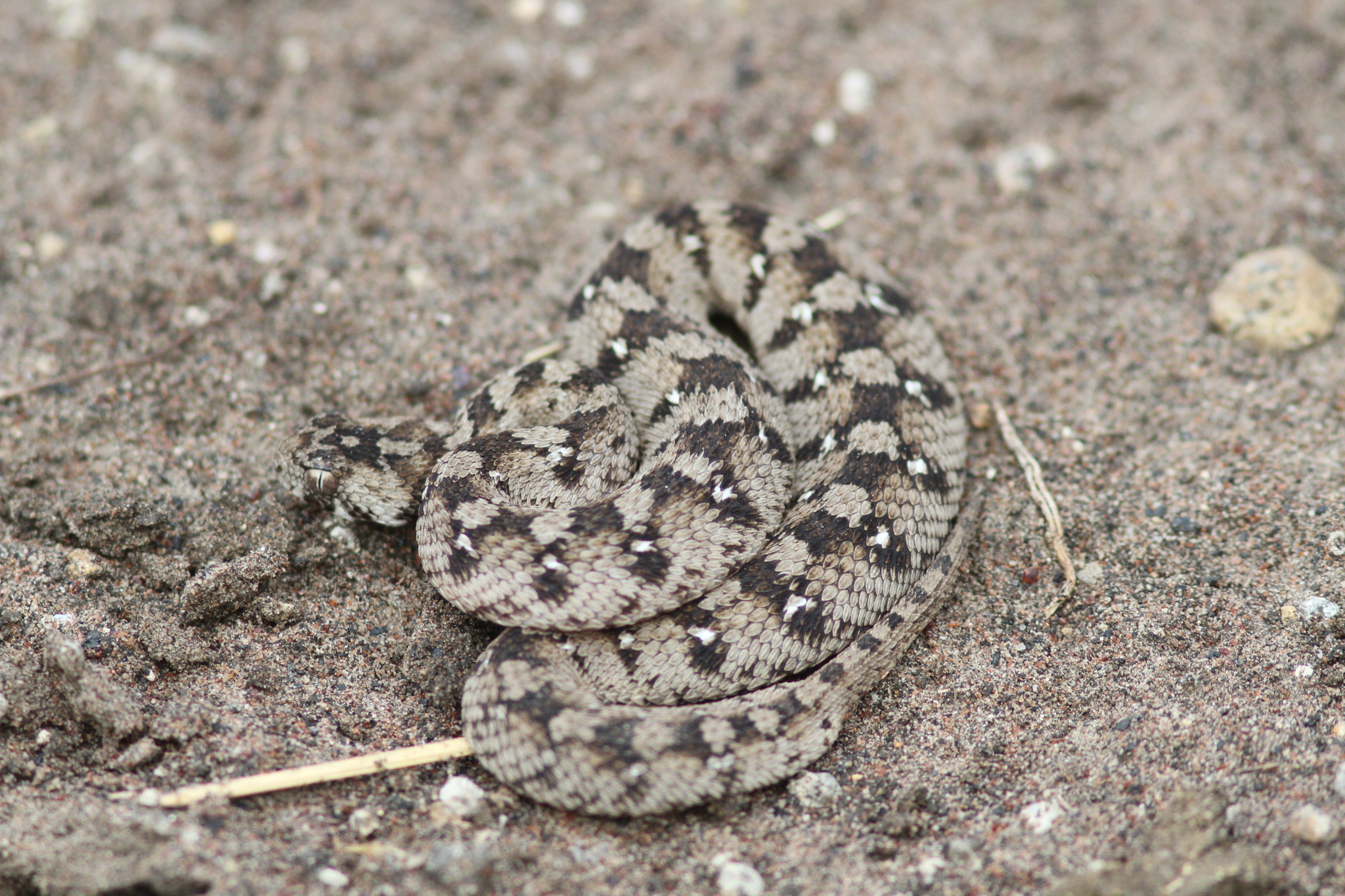
Image	Species	Taxon author	Subsp.*	Common name	Geographic range
	E. borkini	Cherlin, 1990	0		Southwestern Arabian Peninsula (western Yemen, southern Saudi Arabia)
	E. carinatus^{T}	(Schneider, 1801)	4	Saw-scaled viper	Southeastern Arabian Peninsula (Oman, Masirah and eastern UAE), southwestern Iran, Iraq, Afghanistan, Uzbekistan, Turkmenistan, Tajikistan, Pakistan (including Urak near Quetta and Astola Island off the Makran Coast), India, Sri Lanka
	E. coloratus	Günther, 1878	0	Painted saw-scaled viper	Southeastern Egypt east of the Nile and as far south as the 24th parallel, Sinai, Israel, Jordan, and the Arabian Peninsula in Saudi Arabia, Yemen and Oman
	E. hughesi	Cherlin, 1990	0	Hughes' saw-scaled viper	Somalia: northern Migiurtinia, near Meledin
	E. jogeri	Cherlin, 1990	0	Joger's saw-scaled viper	Western and central Mali, Senegal
	E. khosatzkii	Cherlin, 1990	0	Khosatzki's saw-scaled viper	Eastern Yemen and Oman
	E. leucogaster	Roman, 1972	0	White-bellied carpet viper	West and northwest Africa: extreme southern Morocco, Western Sahara, Algeria (Ahaggar), the southern region of Mauritania, Senegal, northern Guinea, central Mali, Burkina Faso, western Niger and northern Nigeria
	E. megalocephalus	Cherlin, 1990	0	Cherlin's saw-scaled viper	Red Sea island between Yemen and Eritrea (Dahlak Archipelago)
	E. ocellatus	Stemmler, 1970	0	African saw-scaled viper	Northwest Africa: Mauritania, Senegal, Mali, Guinea, Ivory Coast, Burkina Faso, Ghana, Togo, Benin, southern Niger, Nigeria
	E. omanensis	Babocsay, 2004	0	Oman saw-scaled viper	United Arab Emirates, Eastern Oman
	E. pyramidum	(Geoffroy Saint-Hilaire, 1827)	2	Egyptian saw-scaled viper	Northeastern Africa: northern Egypt and central Sudan, Eritrea, Ethiopia, Somalia and northern Kenya; disjunct populations in the northern regions of Libya, Tunisia and Algeria
	E. romani	Trape, 2018	0	Roman's carpet viper	Southwestern Chad, southern Niger, Nigeria, northern Cameroon, northwestern Central African Republic

*) Not including the nominate subspecies
^{T}) Type species

== Taxonomy ==
The taxonomy of the group was long confused, with a plethora of species of uncertain status. Several recent studies have clarified the diversity within the genus. This included the descriptions of E. omanensis and E. romani.

A mitochondrial DNA phylogeny for the genus demonstrated the distinctiveness of E. borkini, E. jogeri and E. khosatzkii, but showed E. multisquamatus to be a synonym of E. carinatus.
