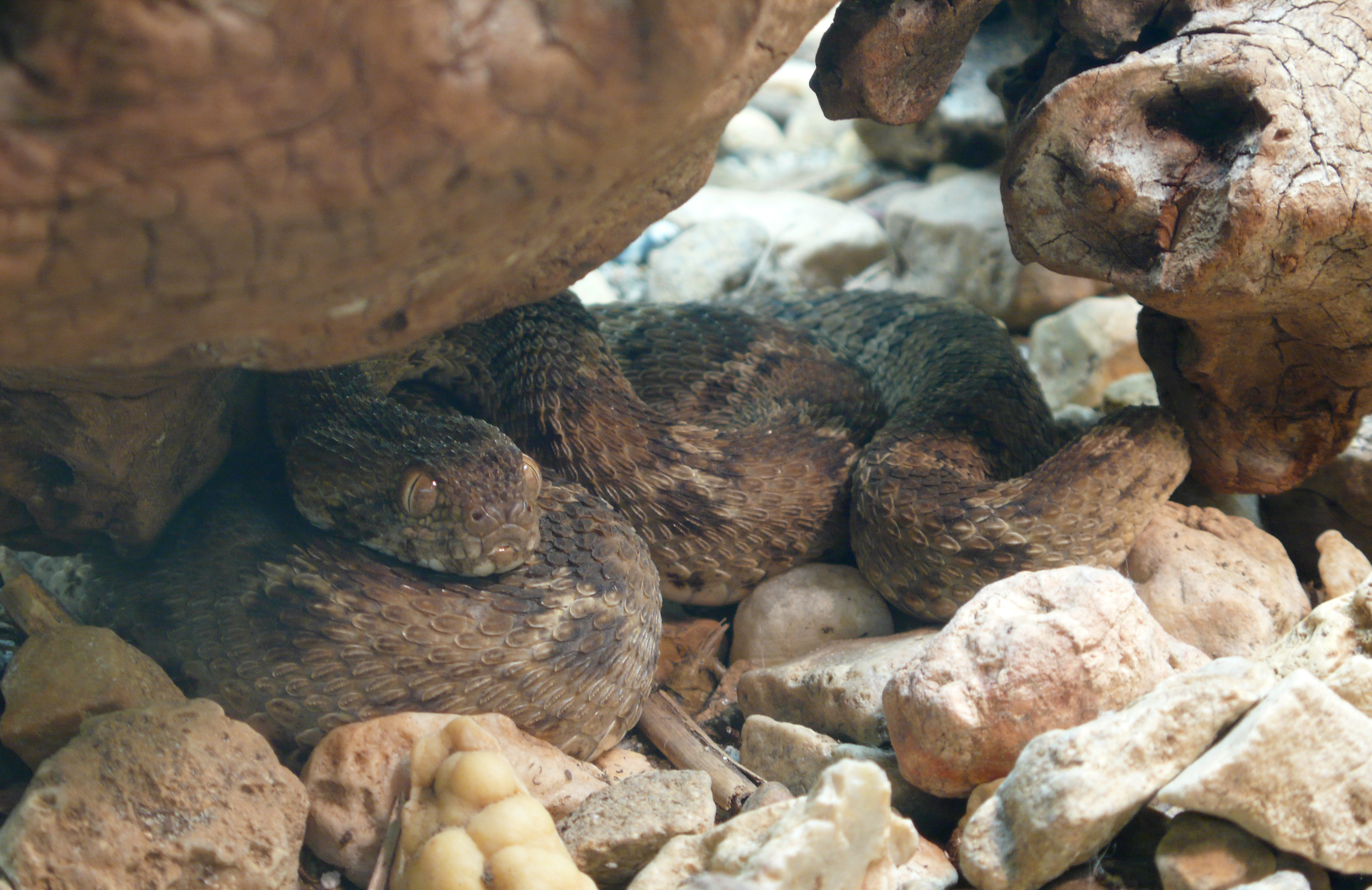

Conservation status
- Least Concern (IUCN 3.1)

Scientific classification
- Kingdom: Animalia
- Phylum: Chordata
- Class: Reptilia
- Order: Squamata
- Suborder: Serpentes
- Family: Viperidae
- Genus: Echis
- Species: E. pyramidum

Binomial name
- Echis pyramidum (I. Geoffroy Saint-Hilaire, 1827)

Synonyms
- Scythale pyramidum Geoffroy Saint-Hilaire in Savigny, 1827; [Echis] arenicola F. Boie, 1827; Echis pavo Reuss, 1834; Echis varia Reuss, 1834; Vipera echis Schlegel, 1837; Vipera pyramidarum Schlegel, 1837; Echis [(Toxicoa)] arenicola — Gray, 1849; Toxicoa arenicola — Günther, 1858; Echis carinatus — Boulenger, 1896 (part); Echis carinatus pyramidum — Constable, 1949; Echis p[yramidum]. pyramidum — Cherlin, 1983; Echis pyramidum — Joger, 1984; Echis [(Toxicoa)] pyramidum pyramidum — Cherlin, 1990; Echis [(Toxicoa)] pyramidum lucidus Cherlin, 1990; Echis [(Toxicoa)] varia varia — Cherlin, 1990; Echis [(Toxicoa)] varia borkini Cherlin, 1990; Echis [(Toxicoa)] varia darevskii Cherlin, 1990; Echis pyramidum pyramidum — Golay et al., 1993

= Echis pyramidum =

Venomous snake, a carpet viper

Echis pyramidum, known as the Northeast African carpet viper, Egyptian saw-scaled viper, and by other common names, is a species of viper endemic to Northeast Africa and the Arabian Peninsula. Like all other vipers, it is venomous. Three subspecies are currently recognized, including the nominate subspecies described here.

This species, along with the closely related Echis ocellatus (both of the Carpet viper species) cause the most cases of snakebite deaths in the world. Two antivenoms are available to counteract snakebites from this species: Polyvalent Anti-viper Venom by VACSERA in Egypt and SAIMR Echis antivenom by South African Vaccine Producers.

== Etymology ==
The specific name, pyramidum, refers to the Egyptian pyramids.

== Description ==
The average total length (body + tail) is 30–60 cm (12–24 in) with a maximum total length of 85 cm (33 in) (possibly slightly more).

== Common names ==
Northeast African carpet viper, Egyptian saw-scaled viper, Egyptian carpet viper, Geoffroy's carpet viper.

== Geographic range ==
In northeastern Africa it occurs in northern Egypt, central Sudan, Eritrea, Ethiopia, Djibouti, Somalia, and northern Kenya. There are also scattered populations in the southwest of the Arabian Peninsula in western Saudi Arabia (south of the 18^{th} parallel), Yemen, South Yemen (in Hadhramaut), and in Oman.

The type locality given is "Egypte" (Egypt).

Disjunct populations reportedly occur in Algeria, Tunisia, Libya, and northern Egypt. It is absent in southern Egypt.

== Subspecies ==
Subspecies	Taxon author	Geographic range
E. p. aliaborri	Drews & Sacherer, 1974	Northern Kenya
E. p. leakeyi	Stemmler & Sochurek, 1969	Northwestern Kenya, Southwest Ethiopia
E. p. pyramidum	(I.Geoffroy Saint-Hilaire, 1827)	Southern Arabia, Somalia, Ethiopia, Sudan, Egypt, Libya and Tunisia.
