= Rock viper =

Rock viper is a common name that is sometimes used to refer to at least three different species:

- Montivipera raddei or Radde's mountain viper, a venomous species found in Turkey, Iran, Armenia, Azerbaijan, and possibly also Iraq
- Montivipera xanthina or Ottoman viper, a venomous species found in northeastern Greece and Turkey, as well as on certain islands in the Aegean Sea
- Craspedocephalus malabaricus or Malabar rock pit viper, a venomous species found in southwestern India
