= Vipera lebetina xanthina =

Vipera lebetina xanthina is a taxonomic synonym that may refer either of the following venomous snakes:

- Montivipera bulgardaghica, a.k.a. the Bulgardagh viper, a viper species endemic in the mountains of southern Turkey
- Montivipera xanthina, a.k.a. the Ottoman viper, a viper species found in northeastern Greece and Turkey, as well as certain islands in the Aegean Sea
