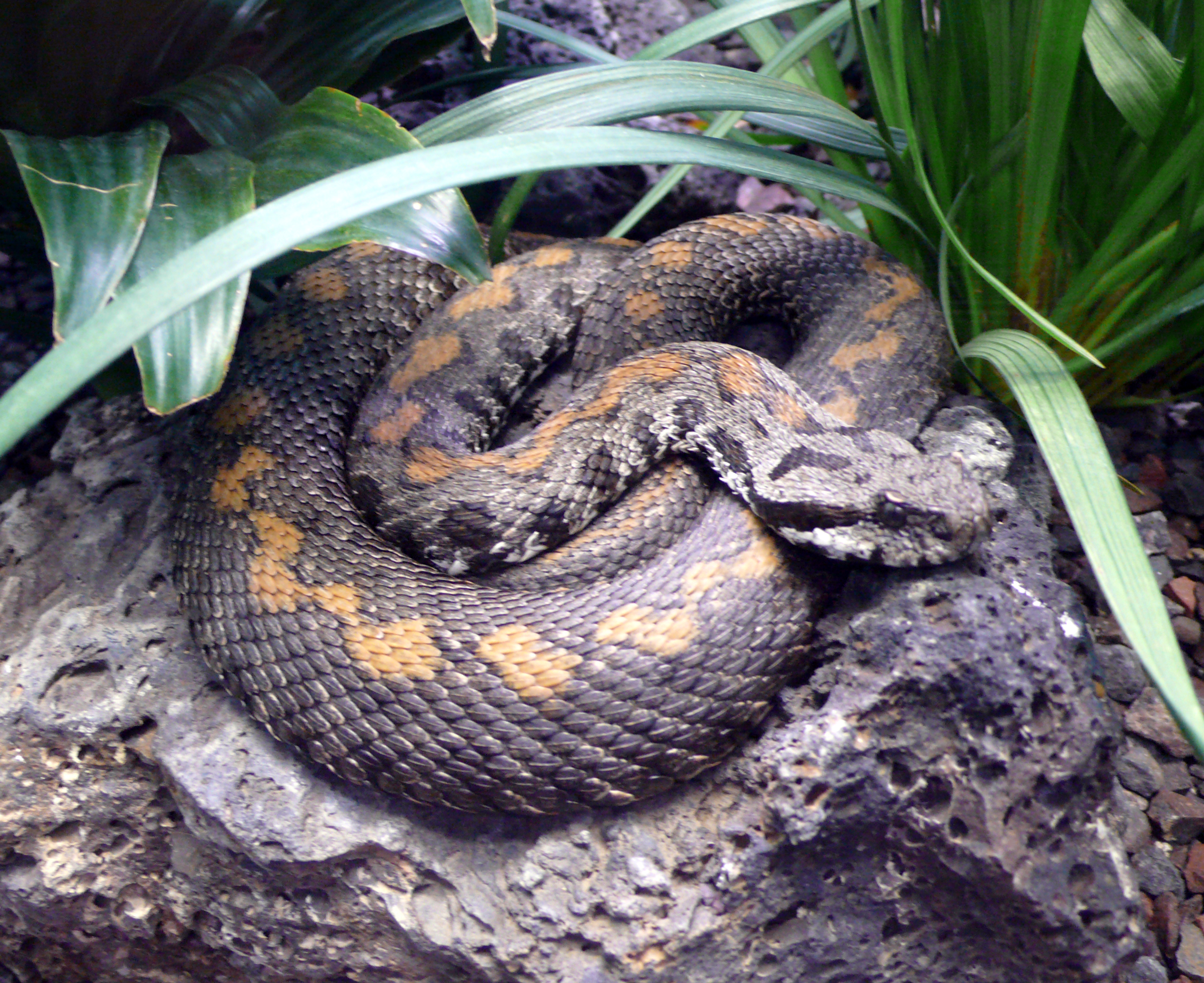

Conservation status
- Near Threatened (IUCN 3.1)

Scientific classification
- Kingdom: Animalia
- Phylum: Chordata
- Class: Reptilia
- Order: Squamata
- Suborder: Serpentes
- Family: Viperidae
- Genus: Montivipera
- Species: M. raddei

Binomial name
- Montivipera raddei Boettger, 1890
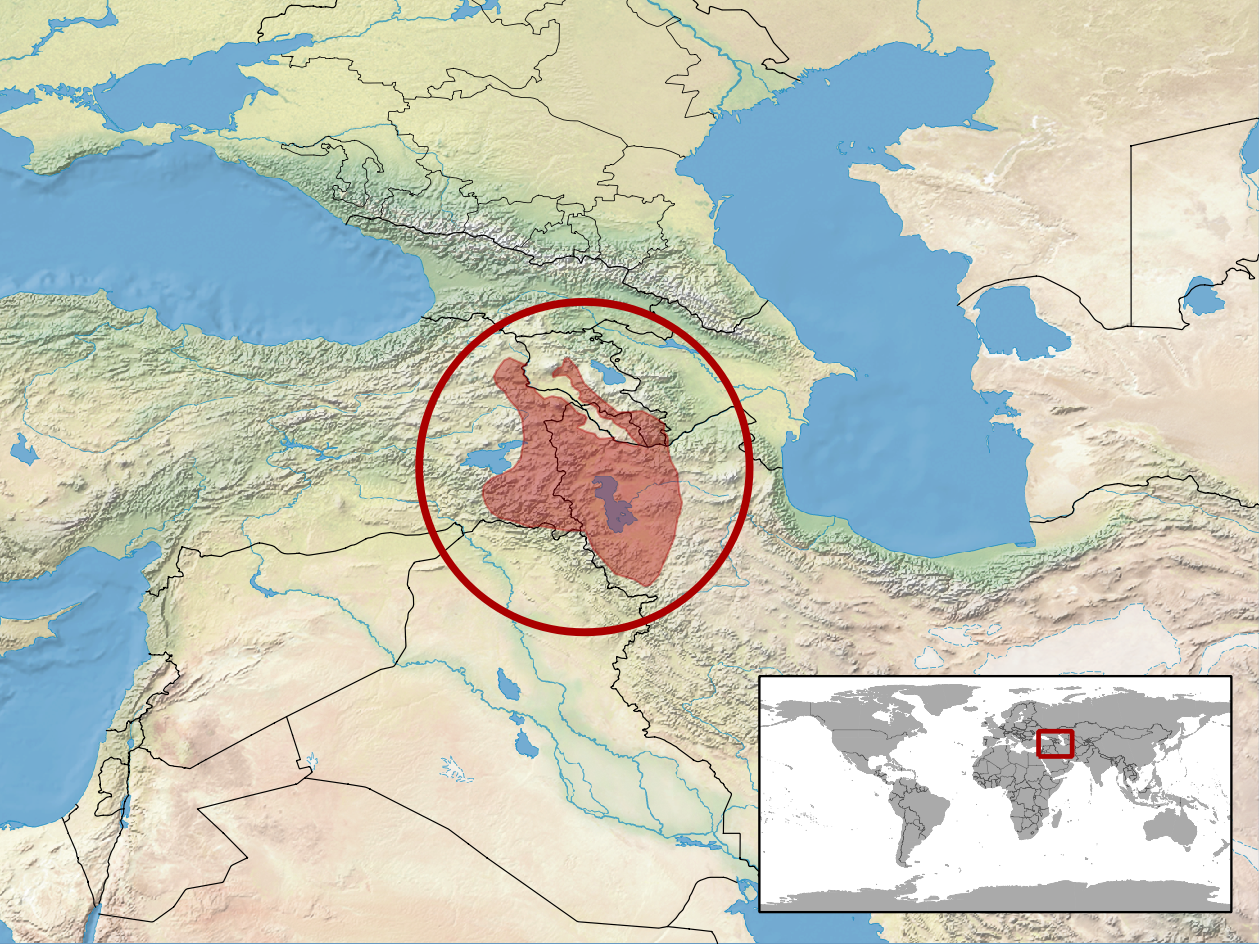

= Montivipera raddei =

Species of snake

Montivipera raddei also known commonly as the Armenian viper (Hy: «Հայկական գյուրզա») is a species of venomous snake, living in rocky habitats in and around Armenia. Known also by local names, it belongs to the subfamily Viperinae of the family Viperidae. The species is native to the Armenian Highlands, including the countries Armenia, southeastern Turkey, northern Iraq, and the northern Zagros Mountains in northwestern Iran. Two subspecies are recognised as being valid.

== Etymology ==
The specific name, raddei, is in honor of German naturalist Gustav Radde.

== Common names ==
Common names for Montivipera raddei include rock viper, Radde's mountain viper, Armenian mountain viper, Armenian viper, Radde's viper, Armenian mountain adder.

== Description ==
Adult males of Montivipera raddei grow to a maximum total length (including tail) of 99 cm (39 in). Adult females are smaller with a maximum total length of 79 cm (31 in).

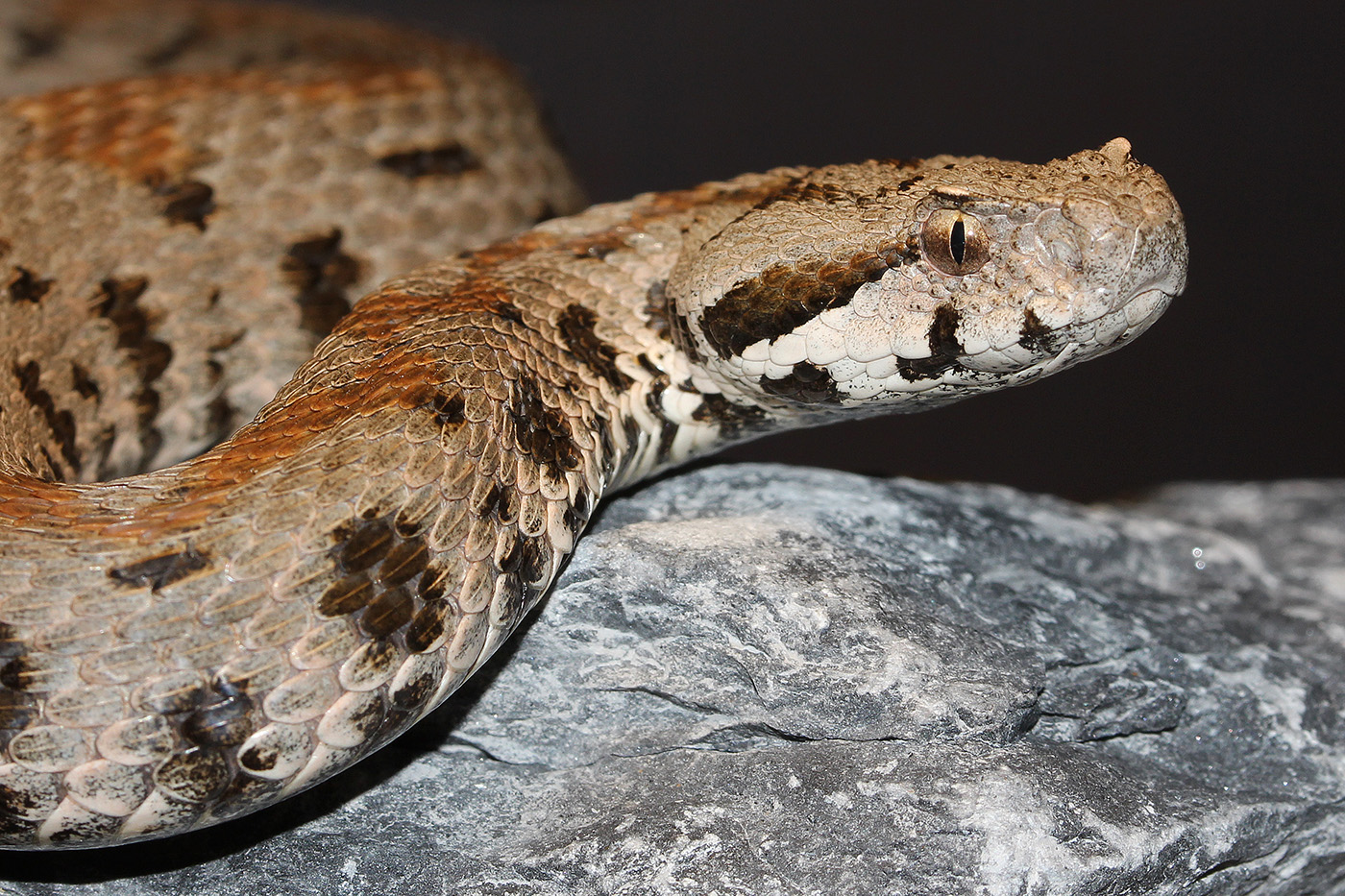

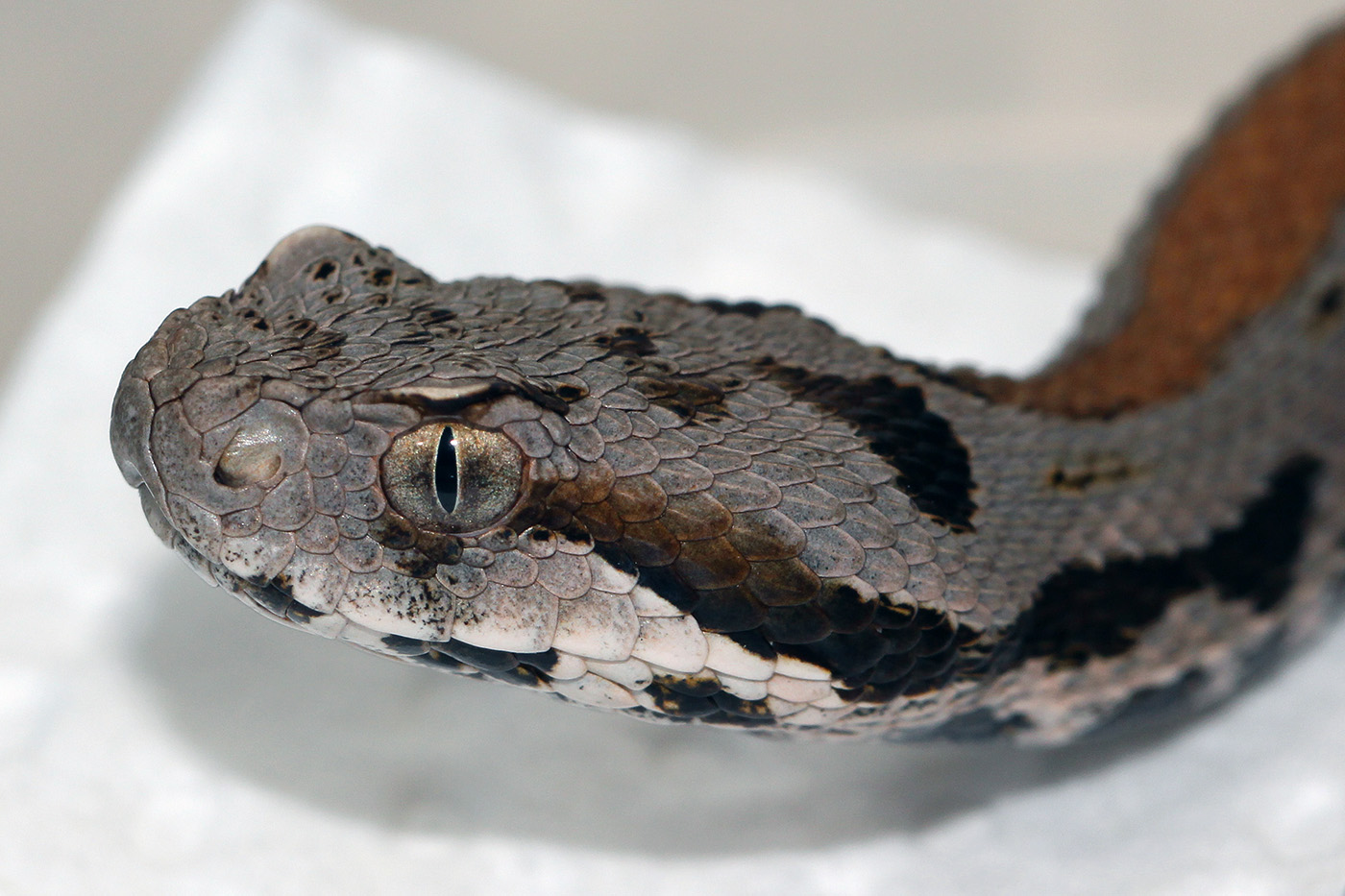

== Geographic range ==
Montivipera raddei is found in Eastern Turkey, northwestern Iran, Armenia, Nakhijevan, and probably Iraq. This species is parapatric or slightly sympatric with M. wagneri in the Arax River valley, Kars Province in Eastern Turkey.

== Conservation status ==
Montivipera raddei is classified as Lower Risk with a subcategory of least concern (LR/lc) according to the IUCN Red List of Threatened Species (v2.3, 1994). This indicates that it has been evaluated, but that it does not satisfy the criteria for any of the categories Critically Endangered, Endangered or Vulnerable. Also, it does not qualify for Conservation Dependent or Near Threatened either. Year assessed: 1996.

It is, however, listed as a protected species (Appendix III) under the Berne Convention.

== Taxonomy ==
Montivipera raddei is apparently closely related to Montivipera r. albicornuta and M. latifii; together they sometimes form the Montivipera raddei complex. There are two subspecies: the nominate from Armenia, Nakhijevan, Eastern Turkey, North-West Iran.
