= Turkish viper =

Turkish viper may refer to:

- Vipera barani or Baran's adder, a venomous viper species found only in Turkey
- Montivipera xanthina or Ottoman viper, a venomous species found in northeastern Greece and Turkey, as well as certain islands in the Aegean Sea
