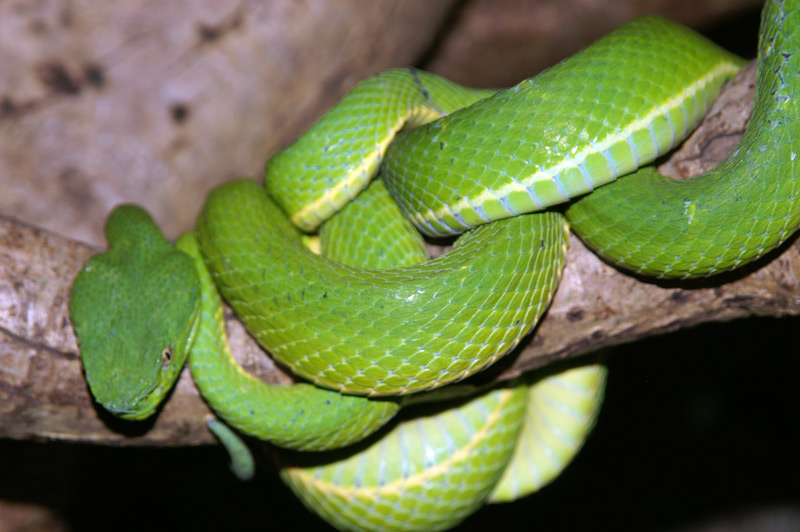

Conservation status
- Least Concern (IUCN 3.1)

Scientific classification
- Kingdom: Animalia
- Phylum: Chordata
- Class: Reptilia
- Order: Squamata
- Suborder: Serpentes
- Family: Viperidae
- Genus: Bothriechis
- Species: B. lateralis

Binomial name
- Bothriechis lateralis Peters, 1862

Synonyms
- Bothriechis lateralis Peters, 1862; B[othrops]. (Bothriechis) lateralis Müller, 1877; Lachesis lateralis Boulenger, 1896; Bothrops lateralis Amaral, 1930; Bothriechis lateralis Campbell & Lamar, 1979

= Bothriechis lateralis =

Species of snake

Common names: side-striped palm pitviper side-striped palm viper, more.

Bothriechis lateralis is a pit viper species found in the mountains of Costa Rica and western Panama. No subspecies are currently recognized.

== Description ==
Adult specimens may exceed 100 centimetres (39 in), but are usually less than 80 centimetres (31 in) in length. These are relatively slender snakes and have a prehensile tail.

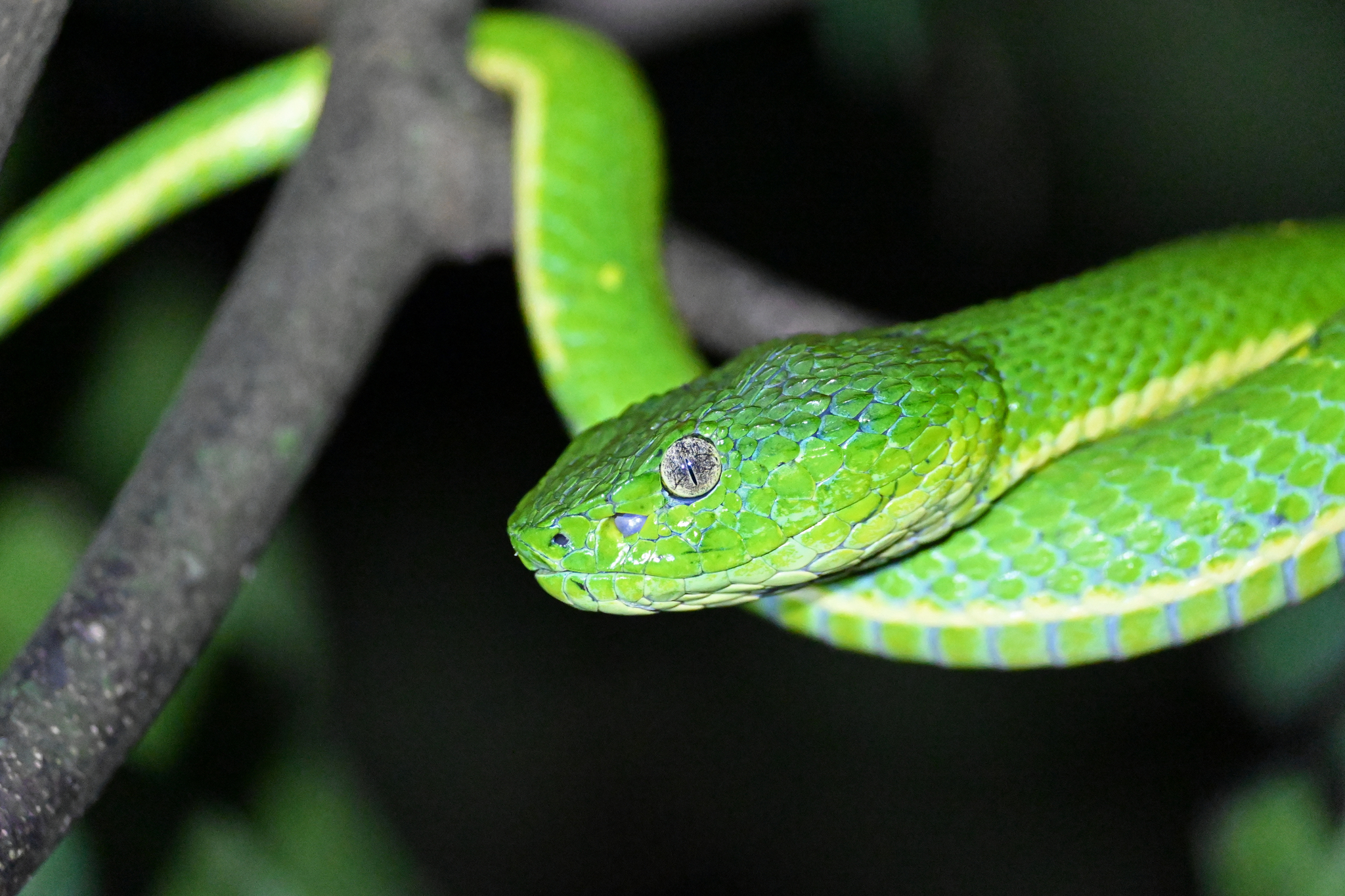
B. lateralis in Costa Rica

The color pattern consists of an emerald green to bluish green ground color, overlaid with a series of yellow alternating paravertebral vertical bars. Some of the scales adjacent to the yellow in this pattern may be blue or black-tipped. The belly is a uniform yellowing-green, bordered on either side by a pale yellow stripe running along the lower portion of the paraventral scales and the extreme lateral part of the ventral scales. The head is uniformly green on top and a blue or blue-gray postocular stripe may be present. If a postocular stripe is present, it is weakly defined, especially in large adults. The iris is yellow.

Juvenile specimens are usually brown with dark brown markings on the head, bronze irises, postocular stripes, paravertebral makings that are edged with yellow, and a tail tip that is yellow or chartreuse. Captive juveniles retain this color pattern for about six months, after which the ground color starts to become a dull lime green and the yellow edges of the paravertebral vertical bars more prominent. It is thought that the shift to adult coloration takes about 18–24 months to complete.

Like many green snakes, captive adults tend to become blue over time, although blue specimens are sometimes found in the wild.

== Common names ==
Side-striped palm-pitviper, side-striped palm viper, green palm viper, yellow-lined palm viper and parrot viper

== Geographic range ==
Found in the mountains of Costa Rica and western Panama, including the Cordillera de Tilarán, the Cordillera Central and the Cordillera de Talamanca to the provinces of Chiriquí Province and Veraguas. Occurs at 850–980 m altitude. The type locality is listed as "Costa Rica vom Vulcan Barbo [Volcán Barba] ... und .. Veragua" [Panama].

== Habitat ==
Occurs in lower montane forest, lower montane wet forest, and lower montane rainforest. Although this species is able to survive is some areas that have been altered for agricultural purposes, such as coffee plantations, it seems they are slowly disappearing from these places. On the other hand, it is common in some protected areas, where populations appear to be doing quite well.

== Behavior ==
This is an arboreal species that spends its time in the thick foliage of forest trees and shrubbery. It is often found at the base of palm fronds. These snakes prefer to remain coiled and still, relying on their camouflage to avoid detection, rather than defending themselves aggressively. However, they will strike quickly if touched.

== Feeding ==
The prehensile tail is not only used as an anchor when resting, but also when it strikes out to grasp its prey, which consists of small birds, rodents, lizards and frogs.

== Venom ==
Bites can be serious, but fatalities are rare. A polyvalent antivenin that covers this species is produced by the Instituto Clodomiro Picado in Costa Rica.
