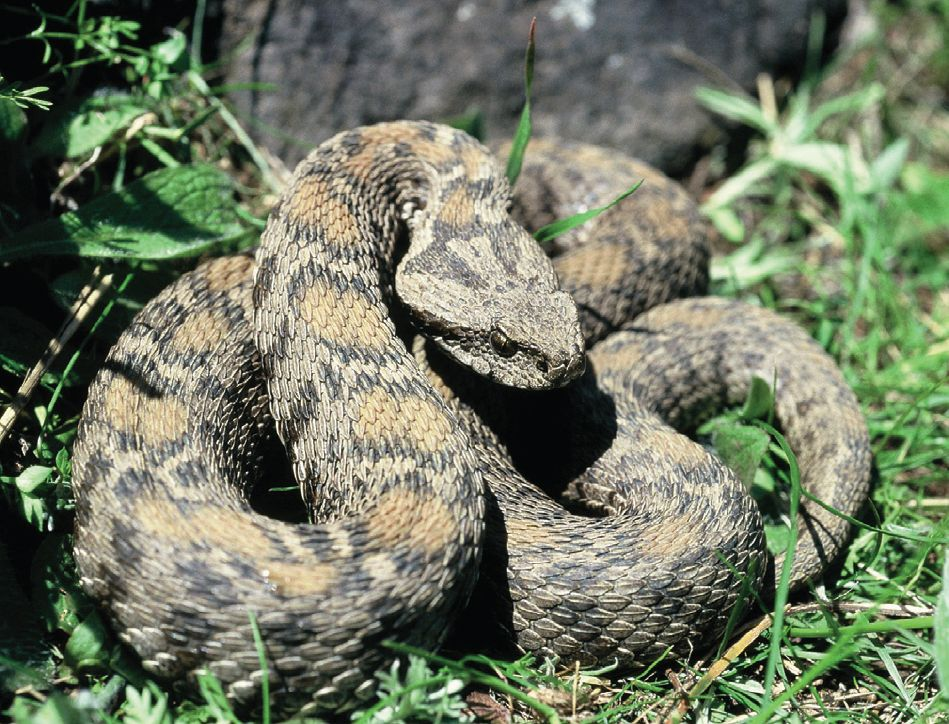

Conservation status
- Critically Endangered (IUCN 3.1)
- CITES Appendix II

Scientific classification
- Kingdom: Animalia
- Phylum: Chordata
- Class: Reptilia
- Order: Squamata
- Suborder: Serpentes
- Family: Viperidae
- Genus: Montivipera
- Species: M. wagneri

Binomial name
- Montivipera wagneri (Nilson & Andrén, 1984)
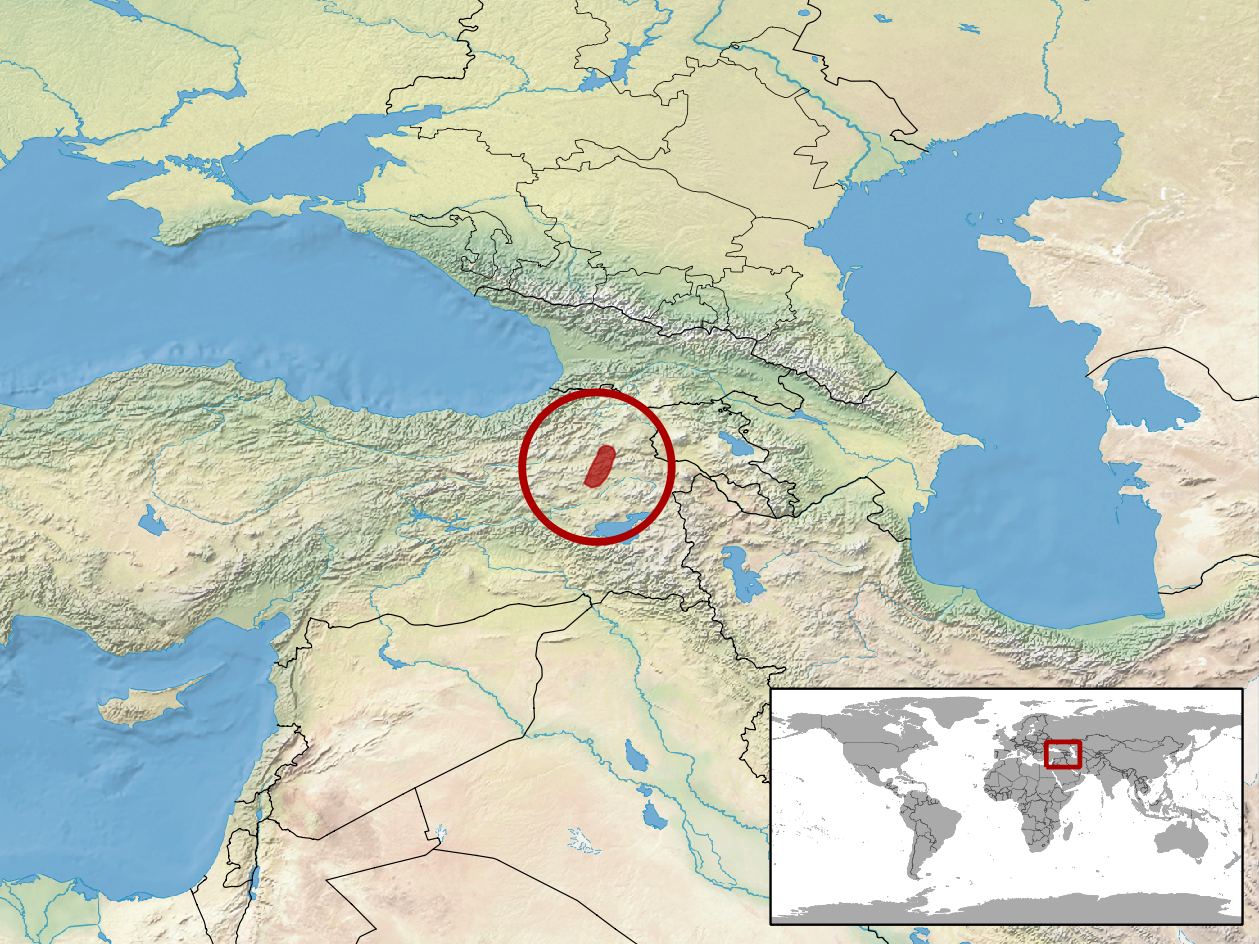

Synonyms
- Vipera wagneri Nilson & Andrén, 1984; Vipera (Montivipera) wagneri — Nilson et al., 1999; Montivipera wagneri — Garrigues et al., 2005

= Wagner's viper =

Species of snake

Wagner's viper (Montivipera wagneri), known as the ocellate mountain viper, ocellated mountain viper, and Wagner's viper, is a species of venomous snake in the subfamily Viperinae of the family Viperidae. The species is native to eastern Turkey and northwestern Iran. There are no subspecies that are recognized as being valid.

== Etymology ==
The specific name, wagneri, is in honor of Moritz Wagner, a German explorer, who collected the type specimen in 1846.

== Description ==
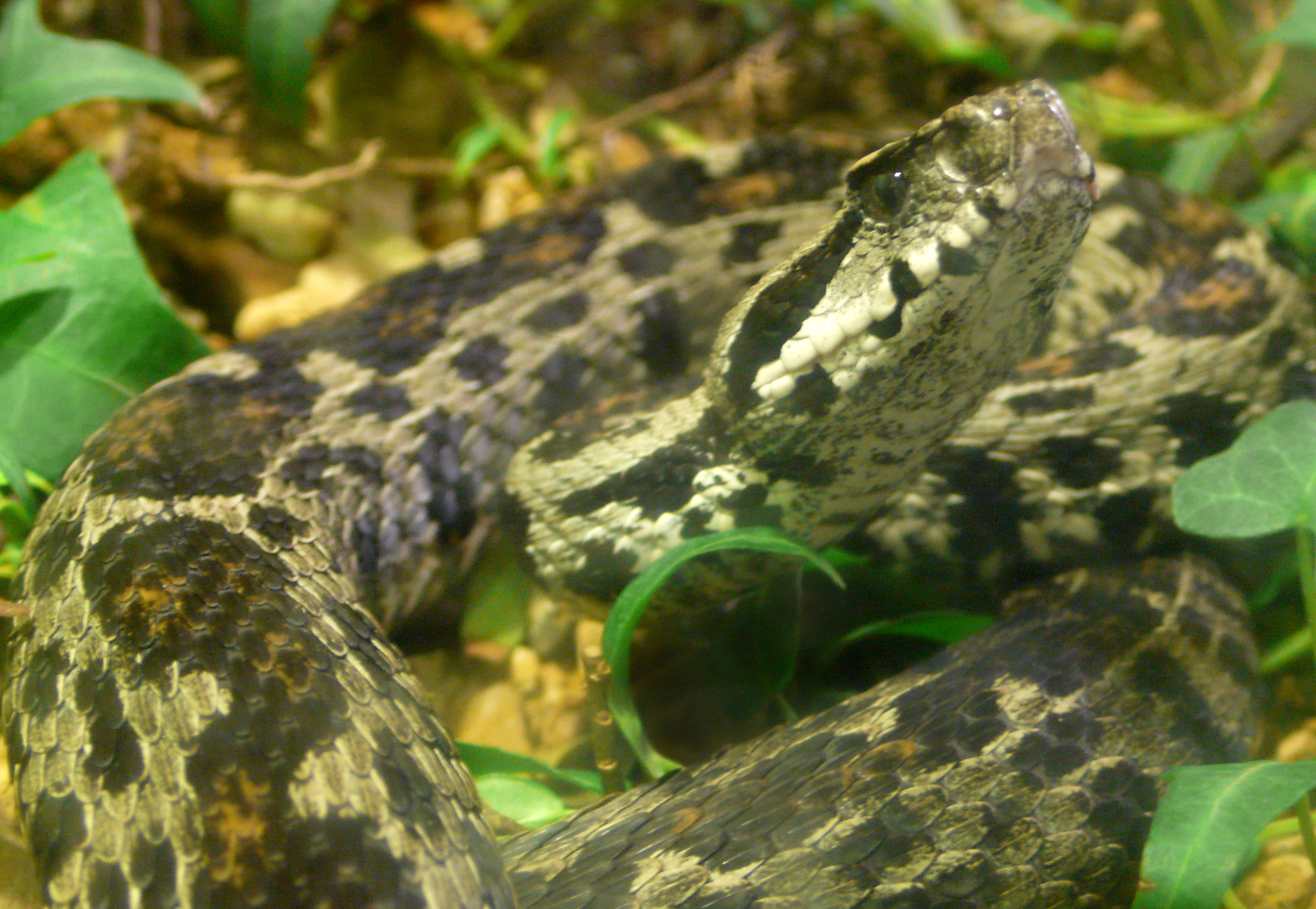
V. wagneri, St. Louis zoo.

V. wagneri grows to a maximum total length (including tail) of 70 to 95 cm (28 to 37 in).

The head is relatively large, elongate, and distinct from the neck. The snout is rounded and covered with small keeled scales. The rostal is in contact with 2–3 apical scales. The eyes are in broad contact with the large supraoculars and surrounded by 12–15 circumorbital scales. Across the top of the head, there are 6–7 interocular scales. There are usually 9 upper labials and 12–13 lower labials. The former are separated from the eye by 1–2 rows of scales. The nostril is located within a single nasal scale. The temporal scales are keeled, and there is usually one canthal scale on either side of the head.

Midbody there are 23 rows of keeled dorsal scales. There are 2–3 preventral scales, 161–170 ventrals, and 23–31 paired subcaudals. The anal plate is single.

The dorsal color pattern consists of a grayish ground color, overlaid with a central series of occasionally connected blotches or spots that run from the back of the head to the tail. These blotches are light brown to yellowish brown or orange, with black borders, and each is 4–8.5 scales wide.

The top of the head usually has two black elongated blotches that form a large dark open V marking, but without an apex. The arms of the V end on the neck. There is usually a dark stripe that runs from the corner of the eye to the angle of the mouth.

== Geographic range ==
Montivipera wagneri is found in the mountains of eastern Turkey and adjacent northwestern Iran.

The type locality given is "vicinity of Lake Urmia (Armenisch-Persische Grenze [=Armenian-Persian border]), province Azerbaijan, N.W. Iran".

== Conservation status ==
The species M. wagneri was classified as "endangered" (EN) in 1996. In 2009 the status was changed to "critically endangered" (CR) due to strong population decline caused by exploitation and collection for the international pet trade. Additionally, the planned Karakurt dam complex will result in the loss of over 80% of the suitable habitat.

This species is also listed on CITES Appendix II, which means that it is not necessarily threatened with extinction, but may become so if international trade in it is not monitored. It is, however, listed as a strictly protected species (Appendix II) under the Berne Convention.

The main threats are capture for the exotic pet trade and habitat loss due to dam construction.

Nine endangered ocellate mountain vipers were hatched on August 16, 2013 at the St. Louis Zoo. The St. Louis Zoo is a part of a cooperative breeding and conservation program for this endangered species. The zoo's vipers were bred on the recommendation of the Association of Zoos and Aquariums Species Survival Plan.

== Habitat ==
Montivipera wagneri is found at altitudes of 1,600 to 1,900 m (5,200 to 6,200 ft) in rocky and grassy habitats.

== Reproduction ==
M. wagneri is viviparous.
