= Montivipera kuhrangica =

Scientific classification
- Kingdom: Animalia
- Phylum: Chordata
- Class: Reptilia
- Order: Squamata
- Suborder: Serpentes
- Family: Viperidae
- Genus: Montivipera
- Species: M. kuhrangica

Binomial name
- Montivipera kuhrangica Rajabizadeh, Nilson & Kami, 2011

Species of snake

Montivipera kuhrangica, commonly known as the Kuhrang mountain viper (named after a mountain they have been found on), is a species of viper endemic to Iran. Like all other vipers, it is venomous.

== Description ==
M. kuhrangica can be distinguished from other Montivipera sp. in many ways, such as their relatively high head scale count as well as distinctly strongly projected supraocular scales.

== Reproduction ==
M. kuhrangica reproduce sexually and are ovoviviparous.

== Geographic range ==
The snake is found in Chaharmahal and Bakhtiari Province, Iran in the Zagros Mountains - specifically Tulip Valley at an elevation of 2490m.

Because the current known geographic range of M. kuhrangica is smaller than 5000km^{2}, their habitat is being damaged by overgrazing and their sightings are so rare, it has been proposed to consider M. kuhrangica as endangered. This has not been officially concluded.
