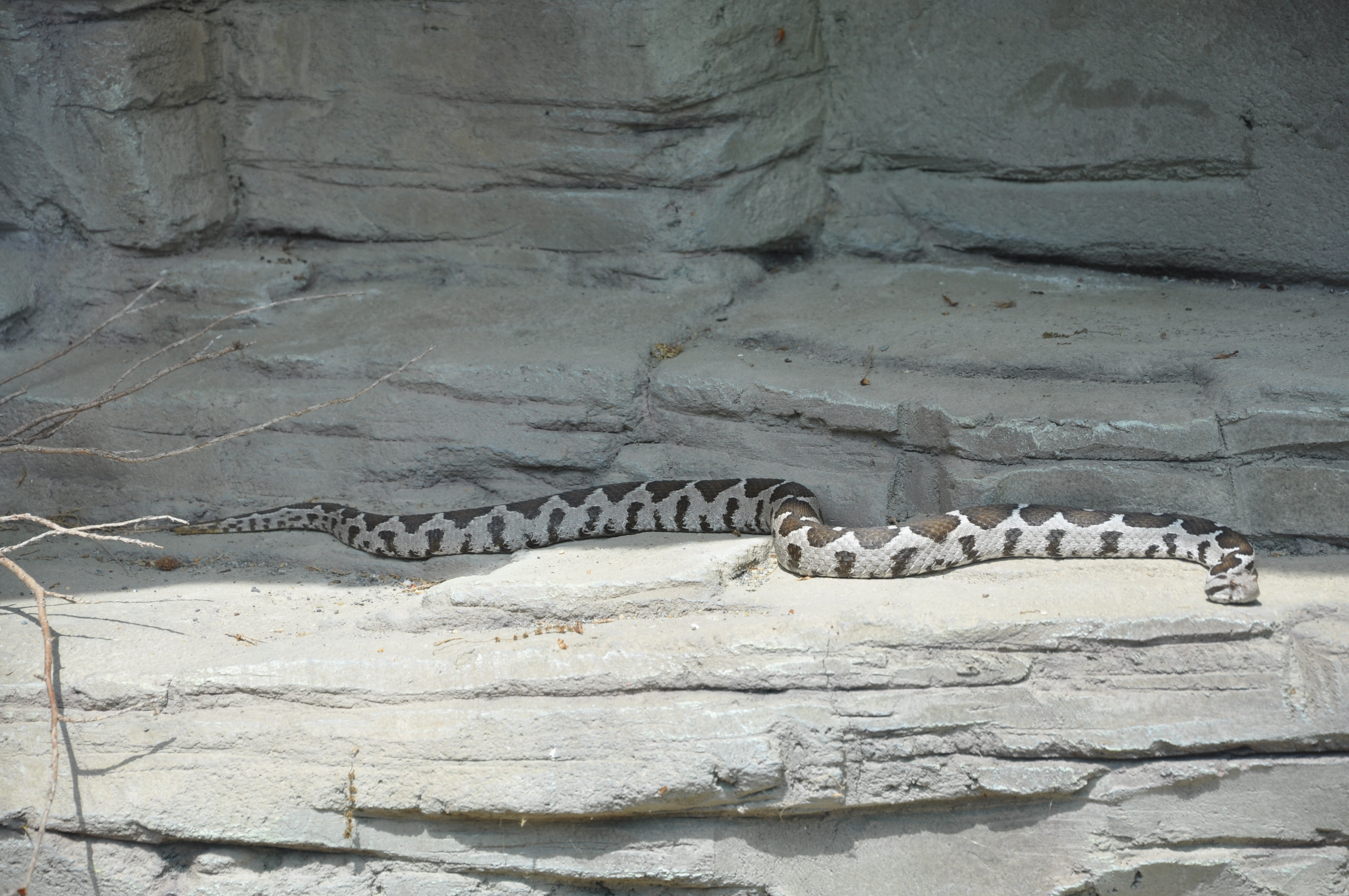
- Montivipera xanthina

Scientific classification
- Kingdom: Animalia
- Phylum: Chordata
- Class: Reptilia
- Order: Squamata
- Suborder: Serpentes
- Family: Viperidae
- Subfamily: Viperinae
- Genus: Montivipera; Nilson, Tuniyev, Andrén, Orlov, Joger & Herrmann, 1999

= Montivipera =

Genus of snakes

Montivipera is a genus of vipers found in Armenia, Azerbaijan, Greece, Iran, Israel, Lebanon, Syria and Turkey. Like all other vipers, they are venomous. The genus Montivipera was previously described as a subgenus of the genus Vipera, but it was elevated to full genus status in 2001 by Lenk, Kalayabina, Wink & Joger.

== Description ==
The maximum total length (tail included) of Montivipera species is 78 cm (31 in), though they are generally smaller.

== Species ==
Image	Species	Taxon author(s)	Subsp.*	Common name(s)	Geographic range(s)
	Montivipera albizona	Nilson, Andrén & Flärdh, 1990	0	Central Turkish mountain viper	Central Turkey
	Montivipera bornmuelleri	F. Werner, 1898	0	Lebanon viper, Bornmueller's viper	Western Asia
	Montivipera bulgardaghica	Nilson & Andrén, 1985	0	mountain Bulgar viper, Bulgardagh viper	Southern Turkey
	Montivipera kuhrangica	Rajabizadeh, Nilson & Kami, 2011	0	Kuhrag mountain viper	Iran
	Montivipera latifii	Mertens, Darevsky & Klemmer, 1967	0	Latifi's viper, Iranian valley viper, Lar Valley viper	Iran
Armenian viper coiled in a forest	Montivipera raddei	Boettger, 1890	1	rock viper, Radde's mountain viper, Kurdistan viper (Vipera raddei kurdistanica), Armenian mountain viper, Armenian viper, Radde's viper, Armenian mountain adder, Zanjhani viper.	Eastern Turkey, northwestern Iran, Armenia, Azerbaijan, and likely Iraqi Kurdistan.
	Montivipera wagneri	Nilson & Andrén, 1984	0	ocellate mountain viper, ocellated mountain viper, Wagner's viper	Eastern Turkey and northwestern Iran.
	Montivipera xanthina	Gray, 1849	0	rock viper, coastal viper, Ottoman viper	Northeastern Greece and Turkey

* Not including the nominate subspecies.
