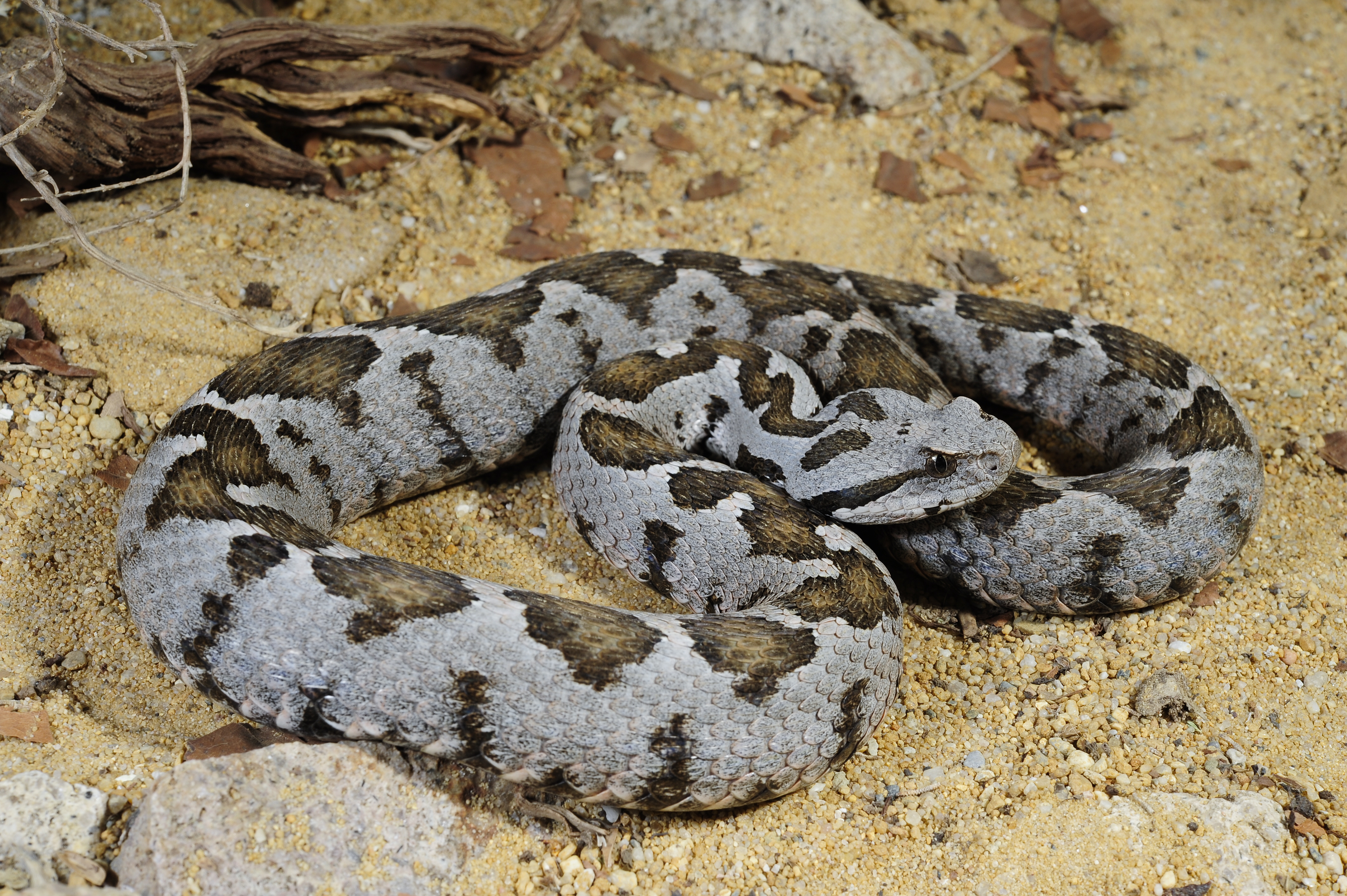

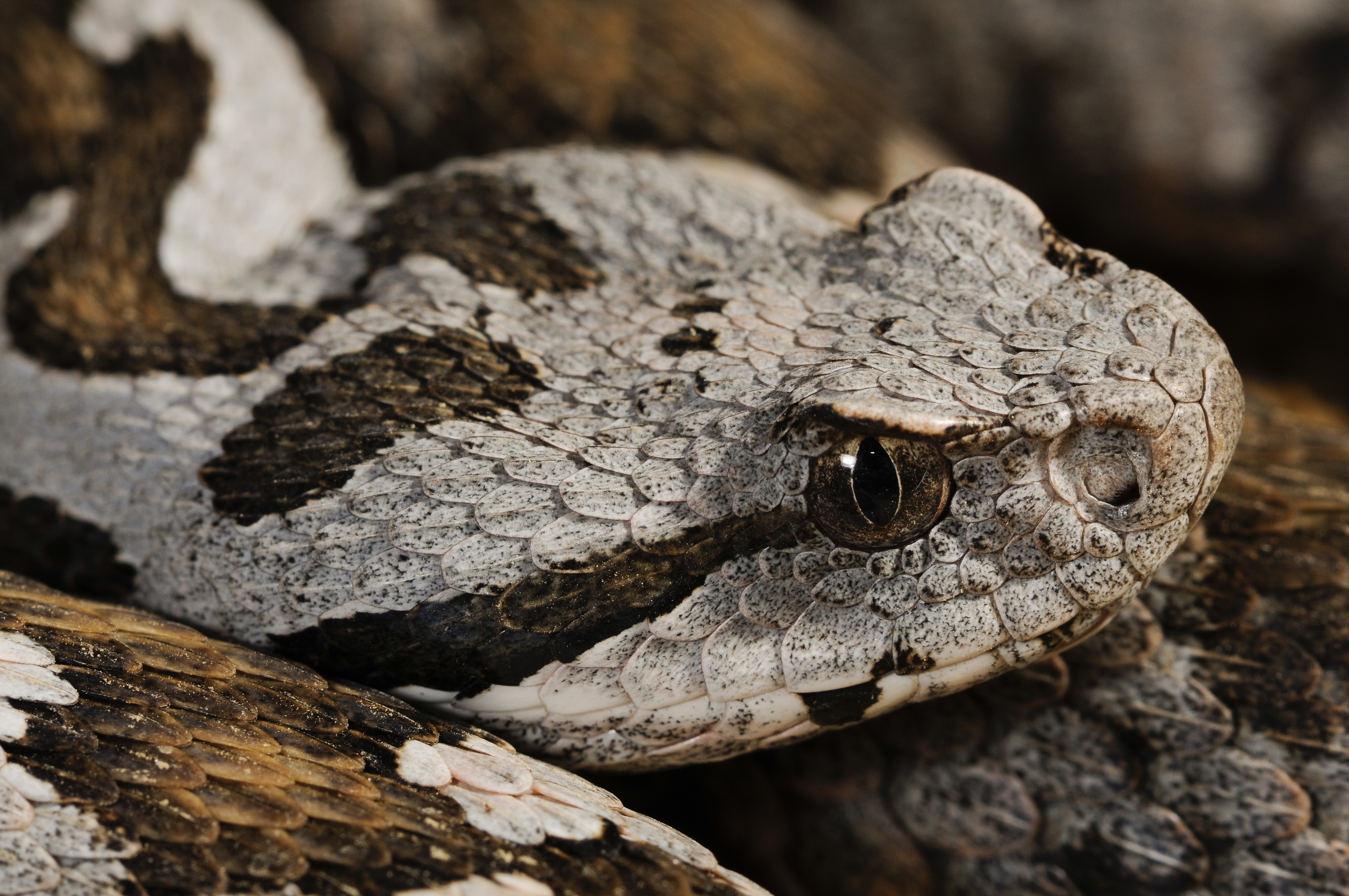

Conservation status
- Least Concern (IUCN 3.1)

Scientific classification
- Kingdom: Animalia
- Phylum: Chordata
- Class: Reptilia
- Order: Squamata
- Suborder: Serpentes
- Family: Viperidae
- Genus: Montivipera
- Species: M. xanthina

Binomial name
- Montivipera xanthina (Gray, 1849)
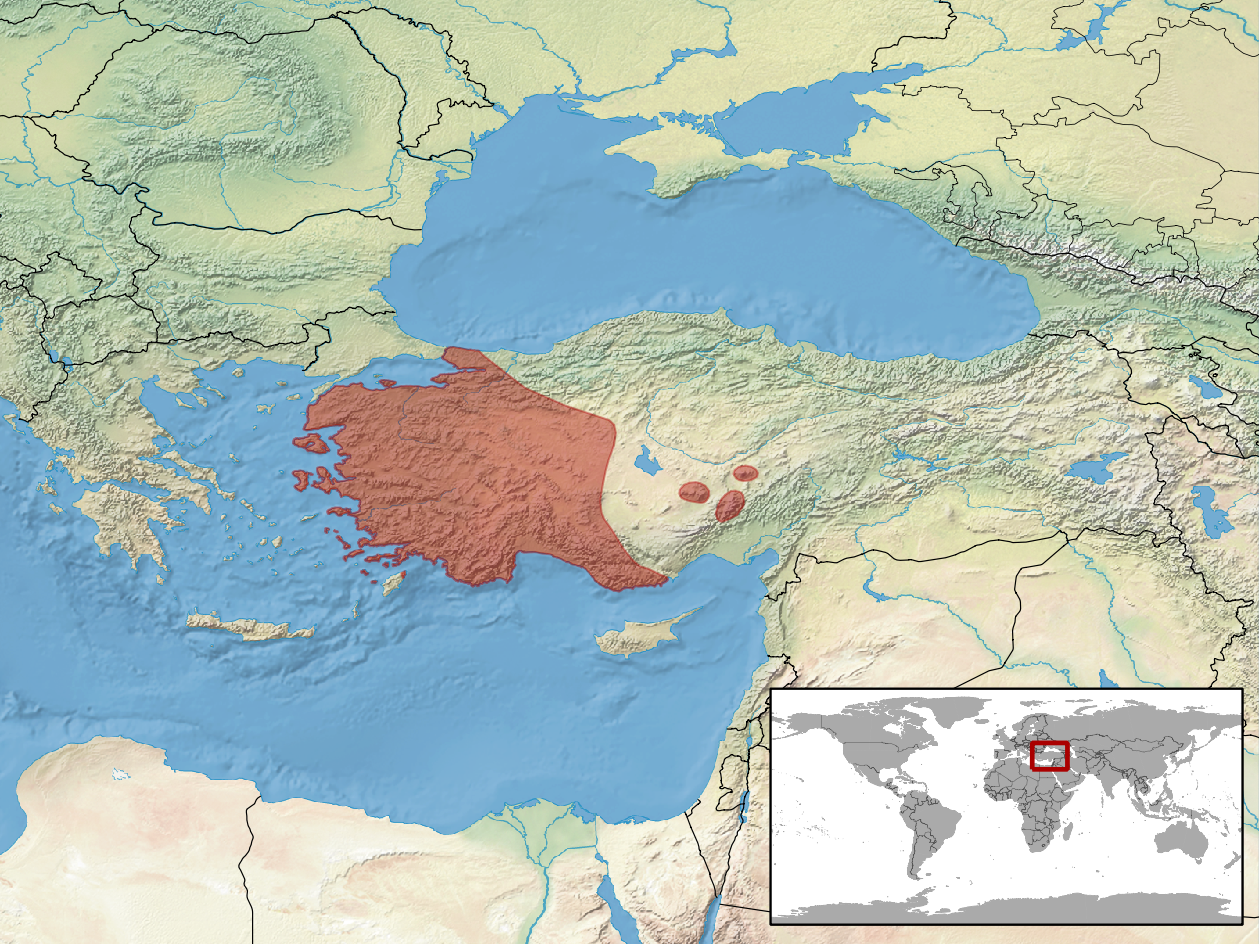

Synonyms: Montivipera xanthina — Nilson et al., 1999
- Daboia Xanthina Gray, 1849; Vipera xanthina — Strauch, 1869; Vipera lebetina var. xanthina — F. Werner, 1902; Vipera xanthina xanthina — Mertens, 1952; Daboia (Daboia) xanthina — Obst, 1983; Daboia (Vipera) xanthina — Radspieler & Schweiger, 1990; Vipera xanthina — Nilson, Andrén & Flärdh, 1990; V[ipera]. xanthina xanthina — González, 1991

= Montivipera xanthina =

Ottoman viper

Species of snake

Montivipera xanthina, known as the rock viper, coastal viper, Ottoman viper, and by other common names, is a viper species found in northeastern Greece and Turkey, as well as certain islands in the Aegean Sea. Like all other vipers, it is venomous. No subspecies are currently recognized.

== Description ==
Dorsally, it is grey or white with a black zig-zag stripe. Melanistic individuals exist. It has keeled dorsal scales.

It usually grows to a total length (body + tail) of 70–95 cm (27.6-37.4 in), but reaches a maximum total length of 130 cm (51.2 in) on certain Greek islands in the Aegean Sea.

=== Habitat ===
Montivipera xanthina can be found living in humid areas. It favors rocky and "well-vegetated" areas for its habitat.

=== Prey ===
The diet of M. xanthina is thought to consist of rodents and other small mammals and native birds. It may prey on lizards, as well.

== Common names ==
Rock viper, coastal viper, Ottoman viper, Turkish viper, Near East viper, mountain viper.

== Geographic range ==
Extreme northeastern Greece, the Greek islands of Simi, Skiathos, Kos, Kalimnos, Samothraki, Leros, Lipsos, Patmos, Samos, Chios and Lesbos, European Turkey, the western half of Anatolia (inland eastward to Kayseri), and islands (e.g. Chalki) of the Turkish mainland shelf.

The type locality given is "Xanthus" [southwestern Turkey (Kınık)], and "Asia Minor." Listed as "Xanthos" by Schwarz (1936). Nilson and Andrén (1986) restricted the species to "Xanthos" [= Xanthus] (Kınık) province Mugla, S. W. Turkish Anatolia" through lectotype designation.

== Conservation status ==
This species is classified as least concern according to the IUCN Red List of Threatened Species. It is listed as such due to its wide distribution, presumed large population, and because it is unlikely to be declining fast enough to qualify for listing in a more threatened category. It is, however, listed as strictly protected (Appendix II) under the Berne Convention.

== Taxonomy ==
According to Nilson, Andrén and Flärdh (1990), M. bornmuelleri, M. bulgardaghica, M. wagneri and M. xanthina are all closely related and together form the Montivipera xanthina group or complex.

== Venom ==
There is not much information and data about the venom composition, activity, and lethality of this specific species. However, similar to other species within the genus Montivipera and the related Vipera genus, it has mainly cytotoxic, haemotoxic, and other minor components to its venom. Although it injects only small amounts of venom in a bite, the venom of this species is highly potent and has been known to have caused fatalities in adult humans. This can be more common in young children or older individuals that get a case of severe envenomation (especially if fangs inject venom directly into a vein, for instance).

According to Batzri-Izraeli et al, 1982, the LD_{50} value via intravenous injection (IV) was 0.25 mg/kg. Similarly, Iranian herpetologist Mahmoud Latifi found the lethality (LD_{50}) of the crude venom from the species Montivipera xanthina to be 0.42 mg/kg in a 1984 study, and 0.35 mg/kg in a 1985 study, which Latifi conducted for the Department of the Environment in Iran (was translated to English in 1991). For most adult male humans of 70 kg (150 lb), the estimated lethal dose is thought to be between 40–50 mg. In his 1984 study, Latifi found the average venom yield to be 10 mg (dry weight of milked venom). This average was attained from the milking of 4,446 specimens of M. xanthina. The maximum yield was 18 mg (dry weight of milked venom) in the same study.
