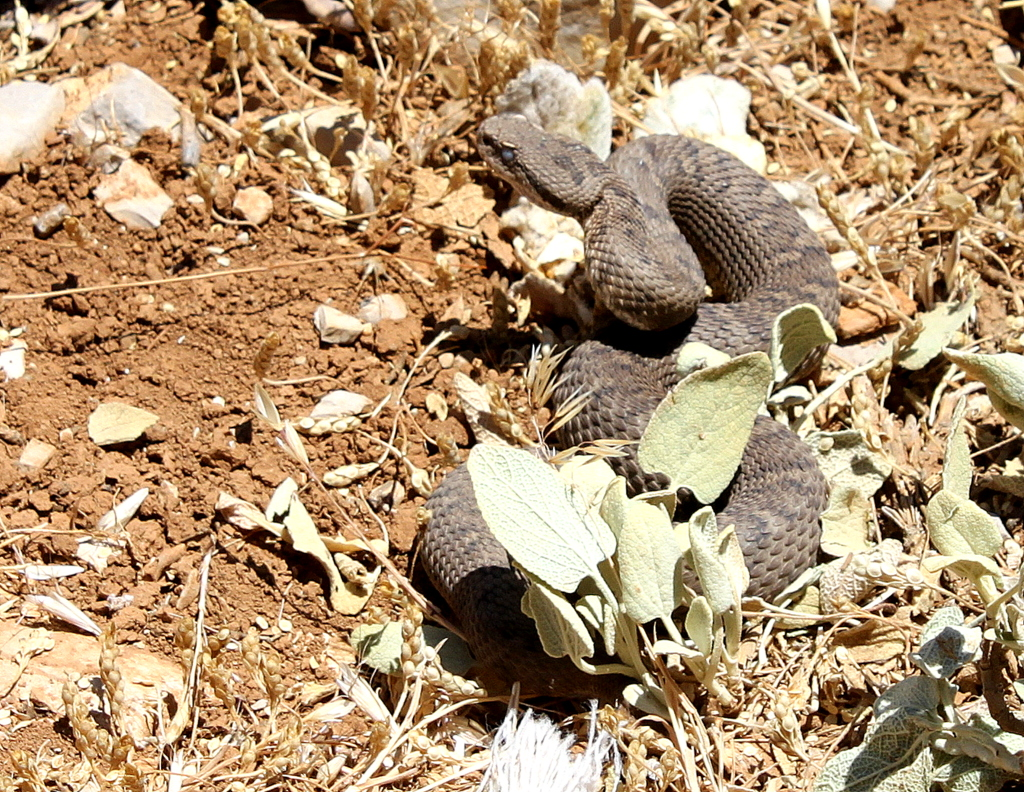

Conservation status
- Endangered (IUCN 3.1)

Scientific classification
- Kingdom: Animalia
- Phylum: Chordata
- Class: Reptilia
- Order: Squamata
- Suborder: Serpentes
- Family: Viperidae
- Genus: Montivipera
- Species: M. bornmuelleri

Binomial name
- Montivipera bornmuelleri F. Werner, 1898
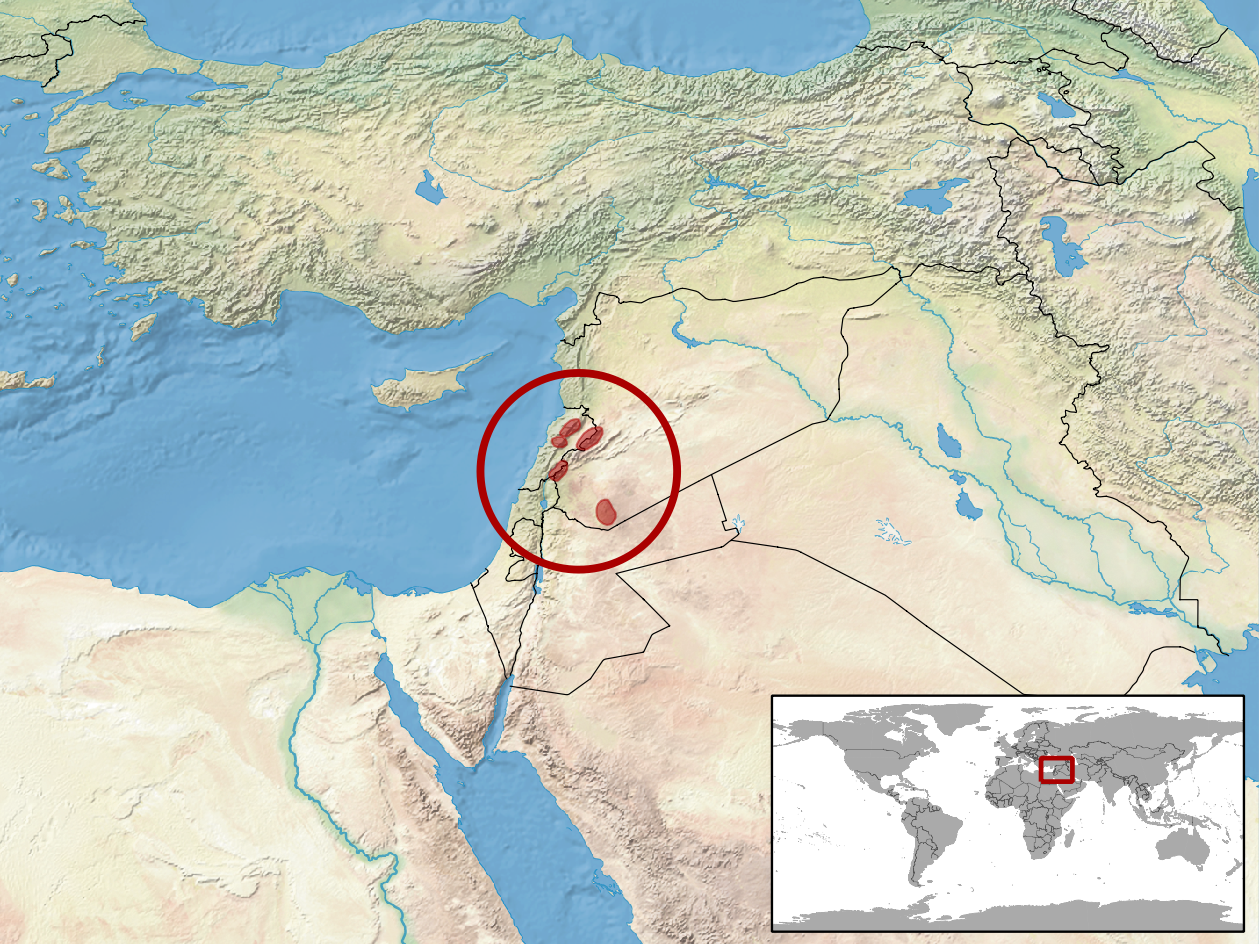

Synonyms
- Lachesis libanotica Hemprich, 1827 (nomen nudum); Vipera Bornmülleri F. Werner, 1898; Vipera lebetina var. bornmülleri — F. Werner, 1902; Coluber bornmülleri — Nikolsky, 1916; Vipera bornmülleri — F. Werner, 1922; Vipera bornmülleri — F. Werner, 1936; Vipera bornmuelleri — Mertens, 1967; Daboia (Daboia) raddei bornmuelleri — Obst, 1983; Vipera bonnmulleri Khole, 1991 (ex errore); Vipera xanthina bornmuelleri — Golay et al., 1993; Montivipera bornmuelleri — Garrigues et al., 2005

= Lebanon viper =

Species of reptile

The Lebanon viper (Montivipera bornmuelleri), also known as Bornmueller's viper, is a species of venomous snake in the subfamily Viperinae of the family Viperidae. The species is native to Western Asia. There are no recognized subspecies.

== Etymology ==
The specific name, bornmuelleri, is in honor of German botanist Joseph Friedrich Nicolaus Bornmüller.

== Description ==
M. bornmuelleri grows to a maximum total length (including tail) of about 75 cm (30 in), but usually much less. Males tend to be larger than females in some populations. In specimens from Mount Lebanon, the maximum total lengths were 47.3 cm (18.6 in) for females and 53.8 cm (21.2 in) for males. The tail accounts for about 7–10% of the total length.

== Geographic range and habitat ==
M. bornmuelleri is found in high mountain areas in northern Israel, Lebanon, and Syria. Its preferred natural habitats are cedar forest, shrubland, and alpine grassland.

== Reproduction ==
M. bornmuelleri is viviparous.

== Taxonomy ==
The original syntypes of M. bornmuelleri were collected in Lebanon at 1800 m (5,900 ft) and in the Bolkar mountains of western Turkey at 2200 m (7,200 ft) as described by Franz Werner in 1898. In 1922, Werner restricted the type locality to Lebanon in his designation of his specimen as a lectotype, and in 1938 separated out the southern varieties as a separate species (Daboia palaestinae). In 1967 Mertens raised the name bornmuelleri to valid species rank for the Lebanese populations, thus leaving the name xanthina for all Turkish populations, which arrangement was accepted by Baran in 1976, and agreed with by Nilson and Andrén in their 1985 paper.

== Conservation status ==
The species M. bornmuelleri is as of 2006 classified as Endangered (EN) according to the IUCN Red List of Threatened Species with the following criteria: B1ab(iii) (v3.1, 2001). This indicates that it is facing a high risk of extinction in the wild because the extent of its occurrence within its geographic range is estimated to be less than 5,000 km^{2} (1,931 sq mi), because its populations are severely fragmented or known to exist at no more than 5 locations, and because a continued decline is observed, inferred or projected in the area, extent and/or quality of its habitat.
