= Preventral scales =

Preventral scales are snake scales positioned anterior to the ventral scales and are wider than they are long, but do not come into contact with the paraventral row of dorsal scales on either side of the body.

== Related scales ==
- Ventral scales
- Dorsal scales
