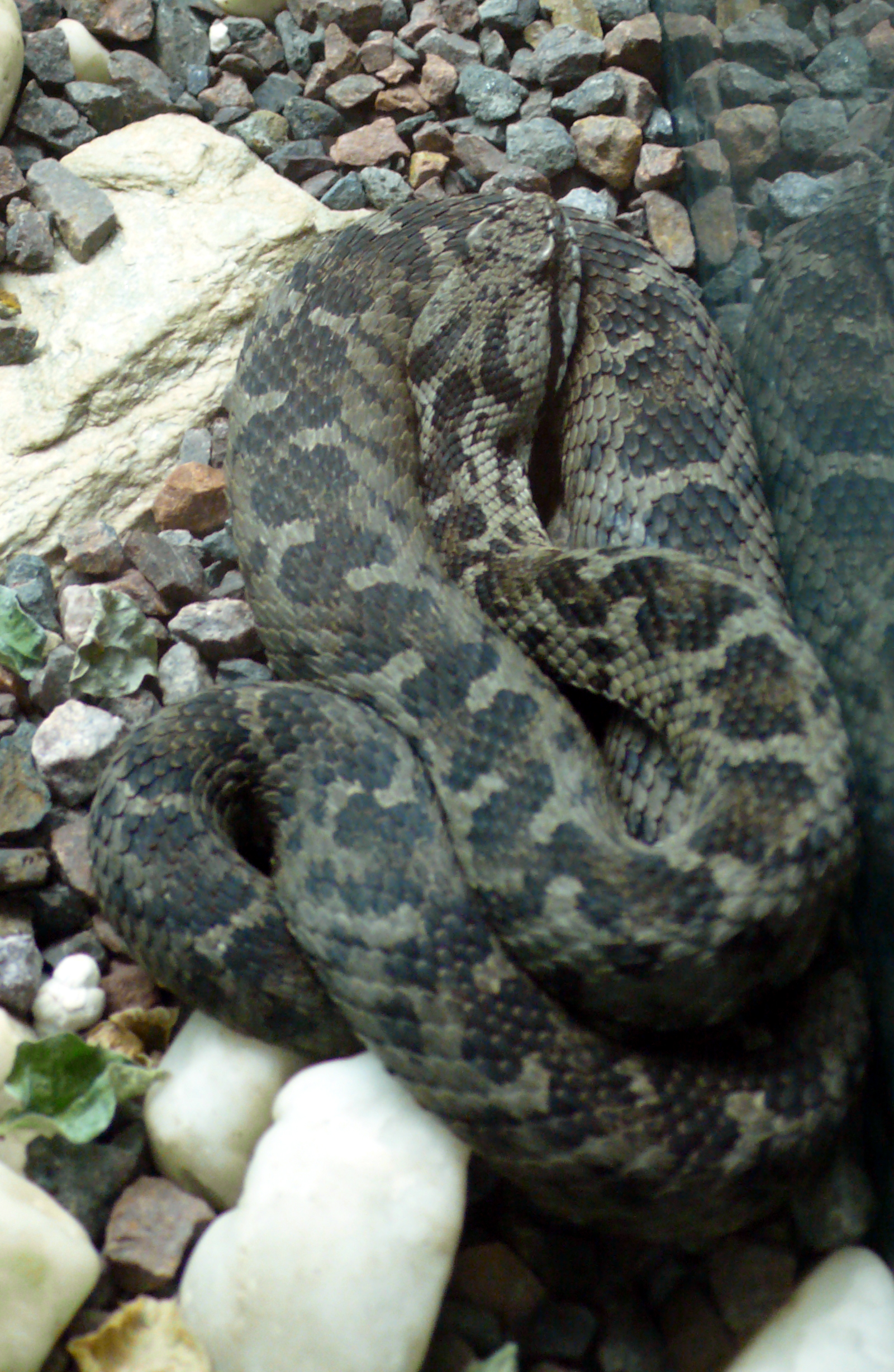

Conservation status
- Least Concern (IUCN 3.1)

Scientific classification
- Kingdom: Animalia
- Phylum: Chordata
- Class: Reptilia
- Order: Squamata
- Suborder: Serpentes
- Family: Viperidae
- Genus: Montivipera
- Species: M. bulgardaghica

Binomial name
- Montivipera bulgardaghica Nilson & Andrén, 1985
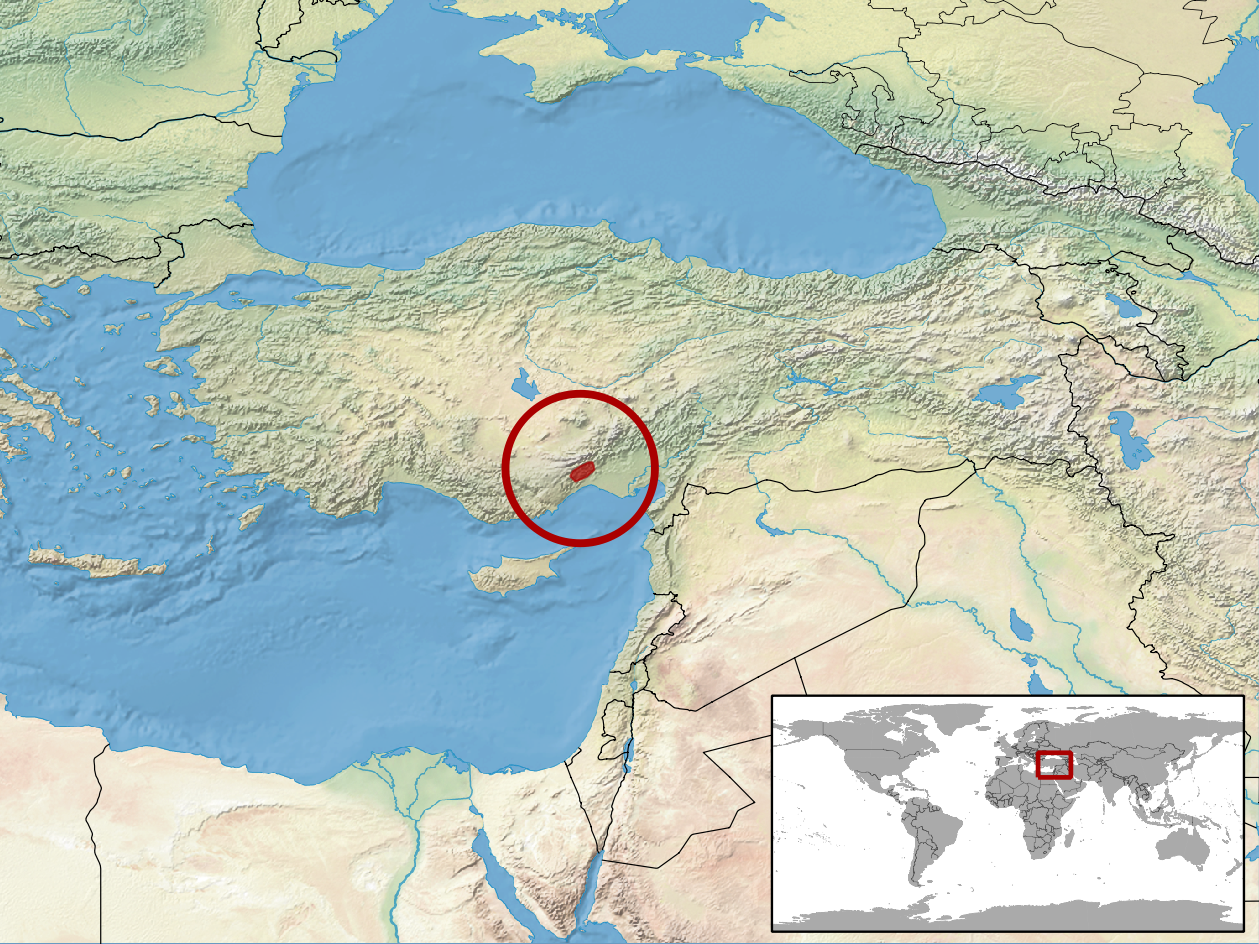

Synonyms: Montivipera xanthina — Nilson et al., 1999
- Vipera bornmuelleri — F. Werner, 1898 (part); Vipera lebetina bornmuelleri — F. Werner, 1902 (part); Vipera lebetina xanthina — Schwarz, 1936 (part); Vipera xanthina — Mertens, 1967 (part); Vipera c.f. xanthina — Joger, 1984 (part); Vipera bulgardaghica Nilson & Andrén, 1985; Vipera xanthina bulgardaghica — Golay, 1993

= Mount Bulgar viper =

Species of snake

The Mount Bulgar viper (Montivipera bulgardaghica), also called the Bulgardagh viper is a viper species endemic to the mountains of southern Turkey. Like all other vipers, it is venomous. No subspecies are currently recognized.

== Description ==
It grows to a maximum total length (body + tail) of about 78 cm (31 in).

== Geographic range ==
It is found in the Bulgar Dagh (Bolkar Dagi) mountains, Nigde Province, south central Anatolia, Turkey. It is a rarely seen animal.

The type locality given is "Cilician Taurus (Kar Boghaz, Bulgar Dagh, 2500 m) province Nigde" (= Karbogaz, Bolkar dagi Ulukişla, 8,200 ft), south central Anatolia, Turkey.

== Conservation status ==
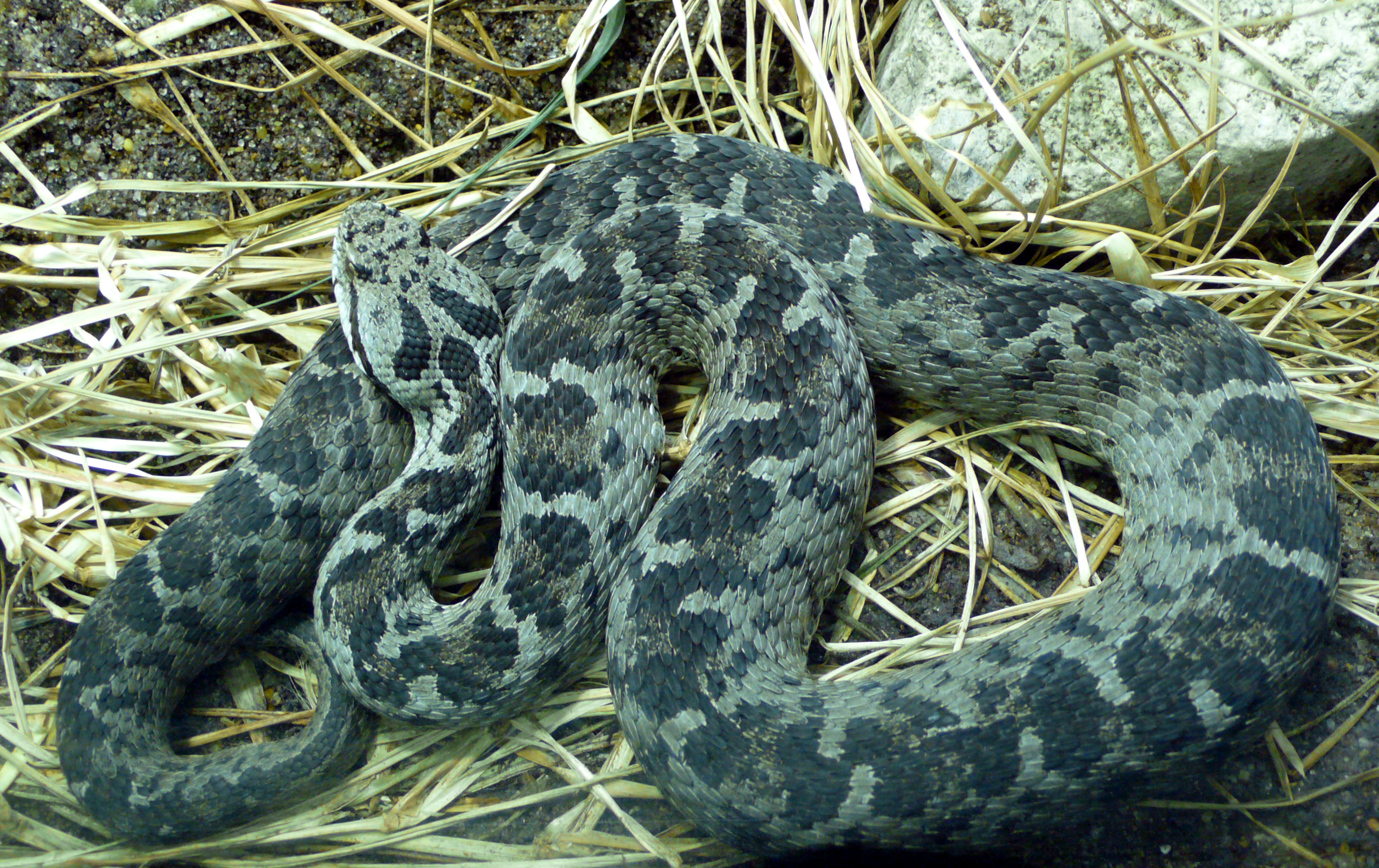
M. bulgardaghica

This species is classified as Least Concern according to the IUCN Red List of Threatened Species.

It is also listed as a protected species (Appendix III) under the Berne Convention.

== Taxonomy ==
This species was considered by Golay et al. (1993) to be a subspecies of M. xanthina, and was subsequently moved to the genus Montivipera by Nilson et al. (1999), who considered it to be a synonym of Montivipera xanthina.
