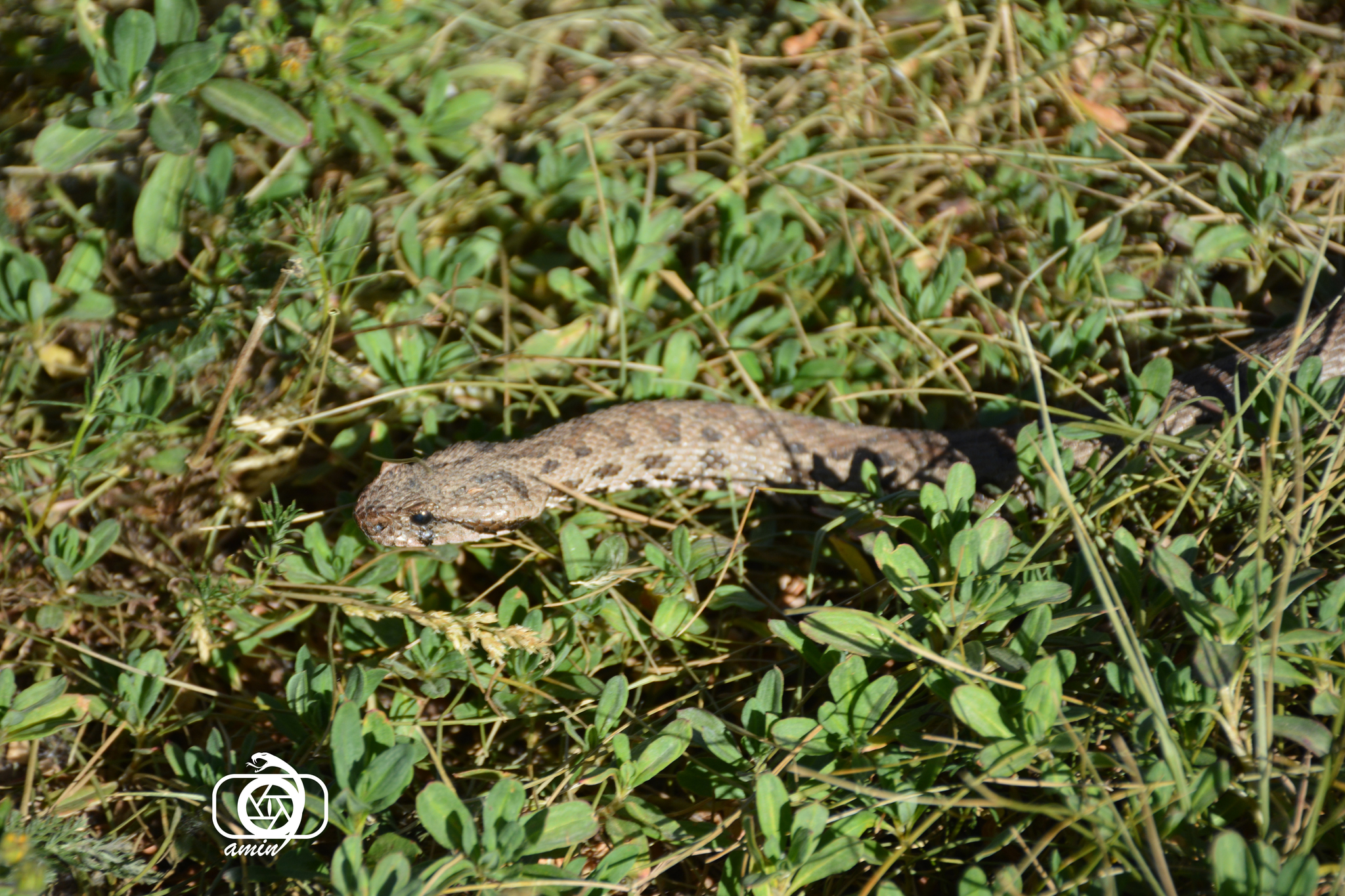

Conservation status
- Endangered (IUCN 3.1)

Scientific classification
- Kingdom: Animalia
- Phylum: Chordata
- Class: Reptilia
- Order: Squamata
- Suborder: Serpentes
- Family: Viperidae
- Genus: Montivipera
- Species: M. latifii

Binomial name
- Montivipera latifii (Mertens, Darevsky & Klemmer, 1967)
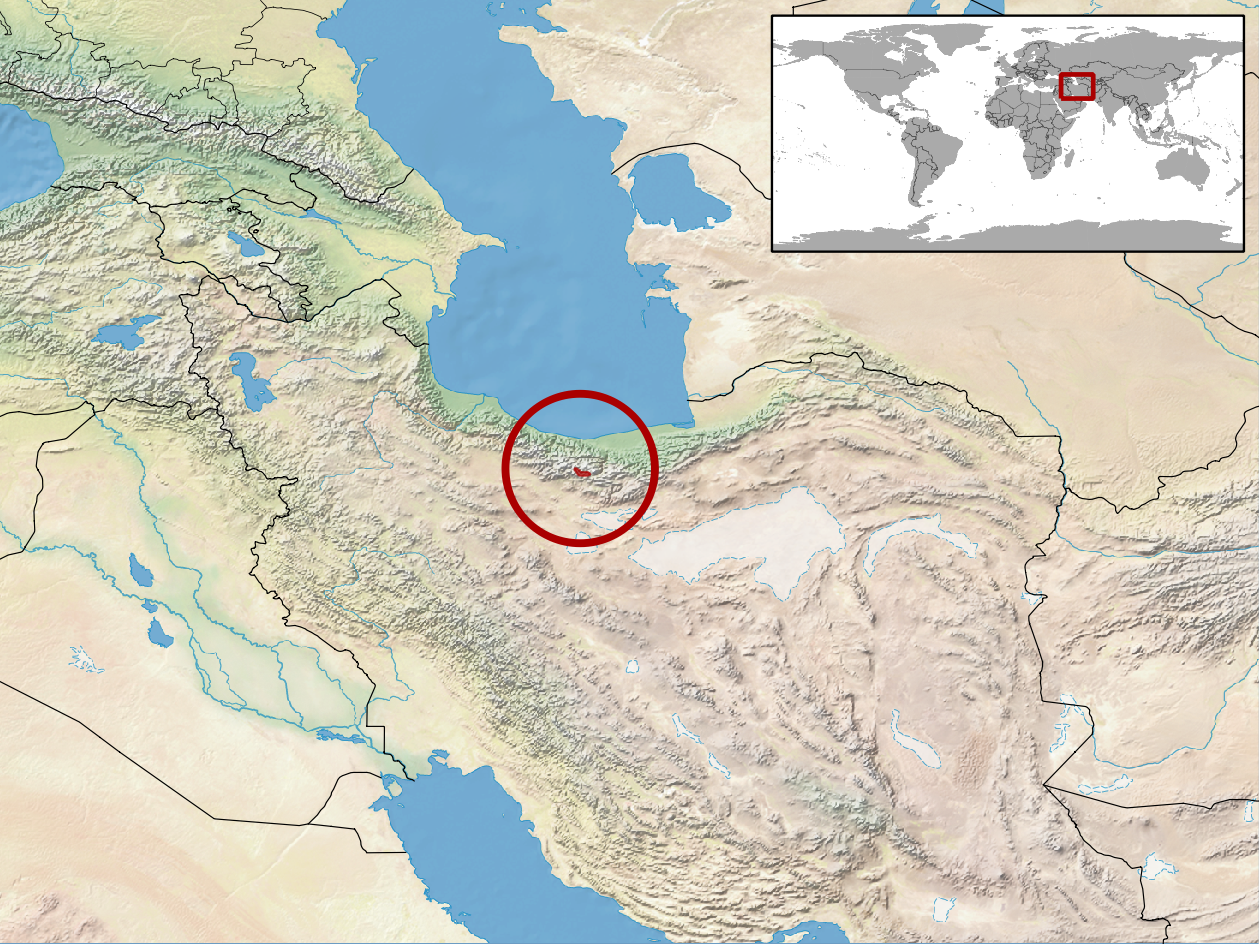

Synonyms
- Vipera latifii Mertens, Darevsky & Klemmer, 1967; Daboia (Daboia) raddei latifii — Obst, 1983; Vipera latifii — Weinstein & Minton, 1984; Vipera raddei latifii — Golay et al., 1993; Montivipera latifii — Wallach et al., 2014

= Montivipera latifii =

Species of snake

Montivipera latifii, also known commonly as Latifi's viper, the Iranian valley viper, and the Lar Valley viper, is a species of venomous snake in the subfamily Viperinae of the family Viperidae. The species is endemic to northern Iran.

== Etymology ==
The specific name, latifii, is in honor of Iranian herpetologist Mahmoud Latifi (1929–2005), who collected the holotype.

== Description ==
For adult males of M. latifii, the maximum total length (including tail) is 78 cm (31 in); for females, 70 cm (28 in).

Holotype: SMF 62585.

== Geographic range ==
M. latifii is found in Iran in the upper Lar Valley in the Alborz Mountains.

The type locality is listed as "Hochtal von Lar (2180–2900 m Höhe), südwestlisch des Demavend-Gipfels im Elburs-Gebirge, nordöstlich von Tehran Shalhenballs, Iran" [High valley of the Lar (7,150–9,500 ft), southwest of Demavend Peak in the Elburz Mountains, northwest of Tehran, Iran].

== Conservation status ==
M. latifii is classified as "Endangered" according to the IUCN Red List of Threatened Species. It has a restricted range (<500 km²) and the total population size is small, probably less than 2,500 adults. It is threatened by over-collection for use in serum production. Although it is not currently facing habitat loss, much of suitable habitat was inundated in the late 1970s by a dam.

== Habitat ==
M. latifii is found in rocky habitats at 2,180–2,900 m (7,150–9,510 ft) altitude.
