= Paraventral scales =

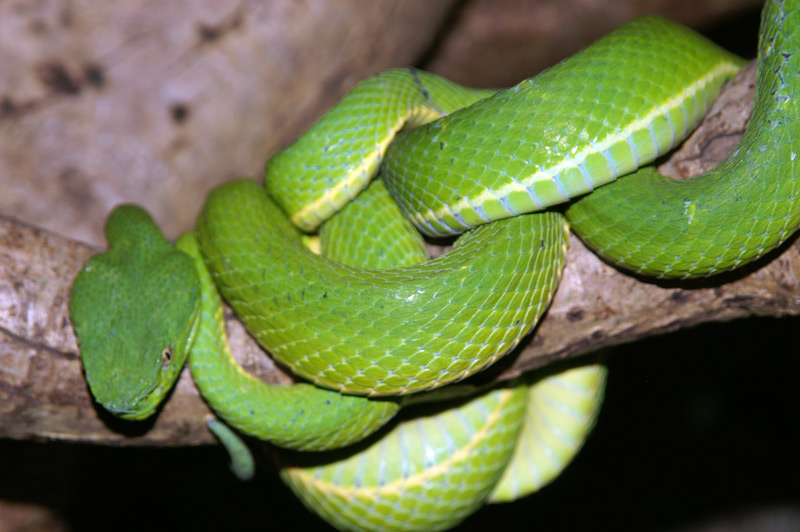
Bothriechis lateralis. The pale yellow stripe runs along the lower portion of the paraventral scales.

In snakes, the paraventral scales are the longitudinal rows of dorsal scales that contact the ventral scales. These are the first rows of dorsal scales on either side of the body and are usually slightly larger than the scales located more dorsally. In species that have mostly keeled scales, the paraventrals are usually smooth or only weakly keeled.

The term paraventral may also refer to the area on either side of the ventral scales.

== Related scales ==
- Dorsal scales
- Ventral scales

== See also ==
- Snake scales
