= Ventral scales =

Enlarged scales along the belly of snakes

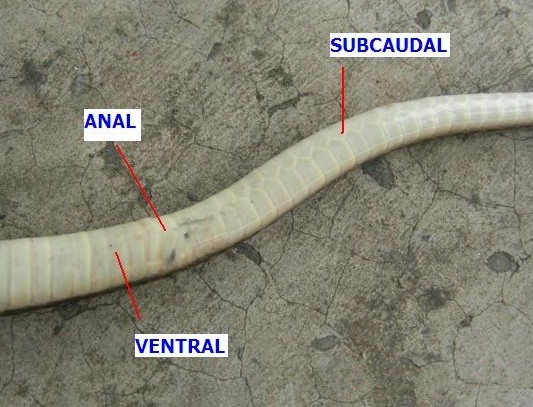
Amphiesma stolata

In snakes, the ventral scales or gastrosteges are the enlarged and transversely elongated scales that extend down the underside of the body from the neck to the anal scale. When counting them, the first is the anteriormost ventral scale that contacts the paraventral (lowermost) row of dorsal scales on either side. The anal scale is not counted.

The term gastrostege (from Greek γαστήρ, γαστρός = belly and στέγη, στέγος = cover, roof) was more often used in the older literature, especially pre-1900 but is rarely used today.

== Related scales ==
- Preventral scales
- Anal scale
- Subcaudal scales
- Paraventral scales

== See also ==
- Snake scale
