= Dorsal scales =

Type of scale in snakes

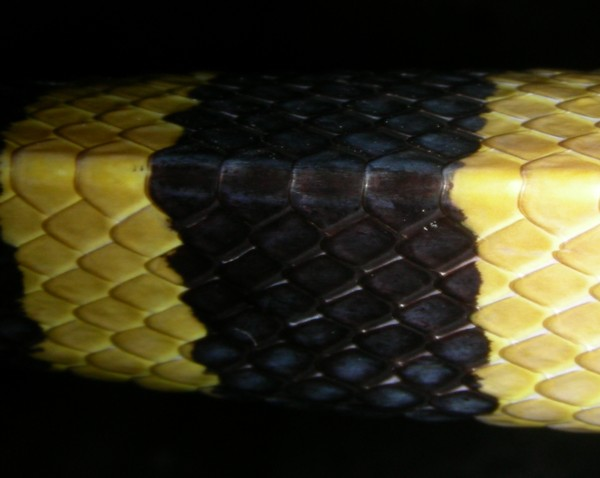
Dorsal scales on a banded krait, Bungarus fasciatus

In snakes, the dorsal scales are the longitudinal series of plates that encircle the body, but do not include the ventral scales.

When counting dorsal scales, numbers are often given for three points along the body, for example 19:21:17. These numbers correspond to the number of dorsal scales around the body at a head's length behind the head, at midbody and at a head's length before the vent. If only one number is given, it is for the midbody count.

Dorsal scales are easiest to count diagonally, starting with the paraventral scale row. In doing so, it is often noted that certain scale rows are raised, keeled or smooth as opposed to the others.

== See also ==
- Snake scales
- Anatomical terms of location
