= Claes Andrén =

Swedish biologist, nature photographer and documentary filmmaker

- Andrén in 2026 in Uppsala
- Born: 7 April 1949 (age 77)
- Occupations: Biologist, university lecturer, nature photographer, documentary filmmaker
- Employer: University of Gothenburg
- Known for: Wildlife documentaries and conservation of amphibians and reptiles

Claes Andrén (born 7 April 1949) is a Swedish biologist, nature photographer, and nature documentary filmmaker. His work focuses on biodiversity, species conservation, and nature conservation, particularly amphibians and reptiles.

== Career ==
Andrén has worked as a lecturer and researcher at the University of Gothenburg. He also helped develop Universeum, a science centre in Gothenburg, and served as scientific director of the Nordens Ark Foundation, a conservation organisation.

He has produced and appeared in several nature documentaries for Sveriges Television (SVT), some of which have also been distributed internationally. Andrén has also undertaken photography assignments for, and had photographs published in, National Geographic.

== Selected productions ==
- Naturens mångfald (The Diversity of Nature; 2021), produced for SVT and released internationally as Extraordinary Ecosystems.
- Naturen som förebild (Nature as a Model; 2018), a miniseries about biodiversity and innovation.
- Överleva (Survive; 2008), an SVT nature documentary about Europe's largest viper.
- Regnskogens hemligheter (Secrets of the Rainforest; 2007), an SVT documentary about threatened species in the rainforests of Vietnam.
- Jakten på Latifis huggorm (The Search for Latifi's Viper; 2004), an SVT nature documentary about a viper in Iran.
- Short nature documentaries about the Amur tiger conservation project, Swedish amphibians and reptiles, and wildlife conservation (1991–2014).
